= Changhua–Kaohsiung Viaduct =

Coordinates: 23°51′52.2″N 120°33′33.4″E

Changhua—Kaohsiung Viaduct 彰化－高雄高架橋
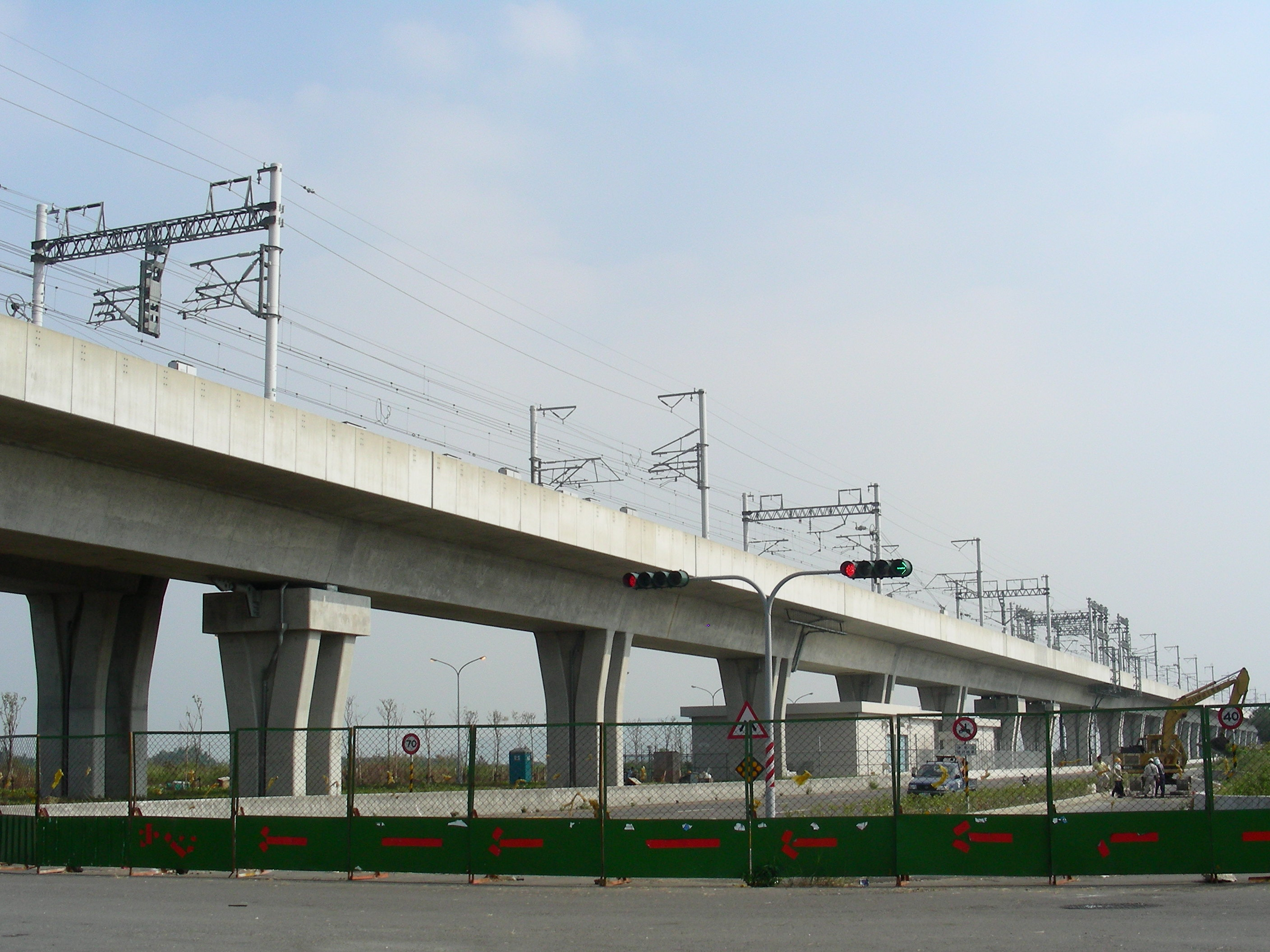
- Carries: Train
- Locale: Taiwan
- Begins: Baguashan, Changhua County
- Ends: Zuoying, Kaohsiung
- Maintained by: Taiwan High Speed Rail

Characteristics
- Total length: 157.317 km (97.752 mi)

History
- Construction end: 2004

The Changhua–Kaohsiung Viaduct (Chinese: 彰化－高雄高架橋) is the world's second longest bridge spanning 157.317 km (97.752 mi) The bridge acts as an overland viaduct for part of the railway line of the Taiwan High Speed Rail network. Over 200 million passengers had been carried over it by December 2012.

== Location ==
The viaduct starts in Baguashan (八卦山) in Changhua County and ends in Zuoying in Kaohsiung.

Changhua, Yunlin, Chiayi, and Tainan stations are located on this viaduct.

== Design ==
Completed in 2004, the bridge is 157.317 kilometers (97.752 mi) in length. The railway is built across a vast series of viaducts, as they were designed to be earthquake resistant to allow for trains to stop safely during a seismic event and for repairable damage following a maximum design earthquake. Bridges built over known fault lines were designed to survive fault movements without catastrophic damage.

== See also ==
- List of bridges in Taiwan
- List of longest bridges in the world
