= Tianzhong =

Urban township in Changhua County, Taiwan

Coordinates: 23.859466°N 120.587799°E

Tianzhong Township 田中鎮 Tanaka
- Urban township
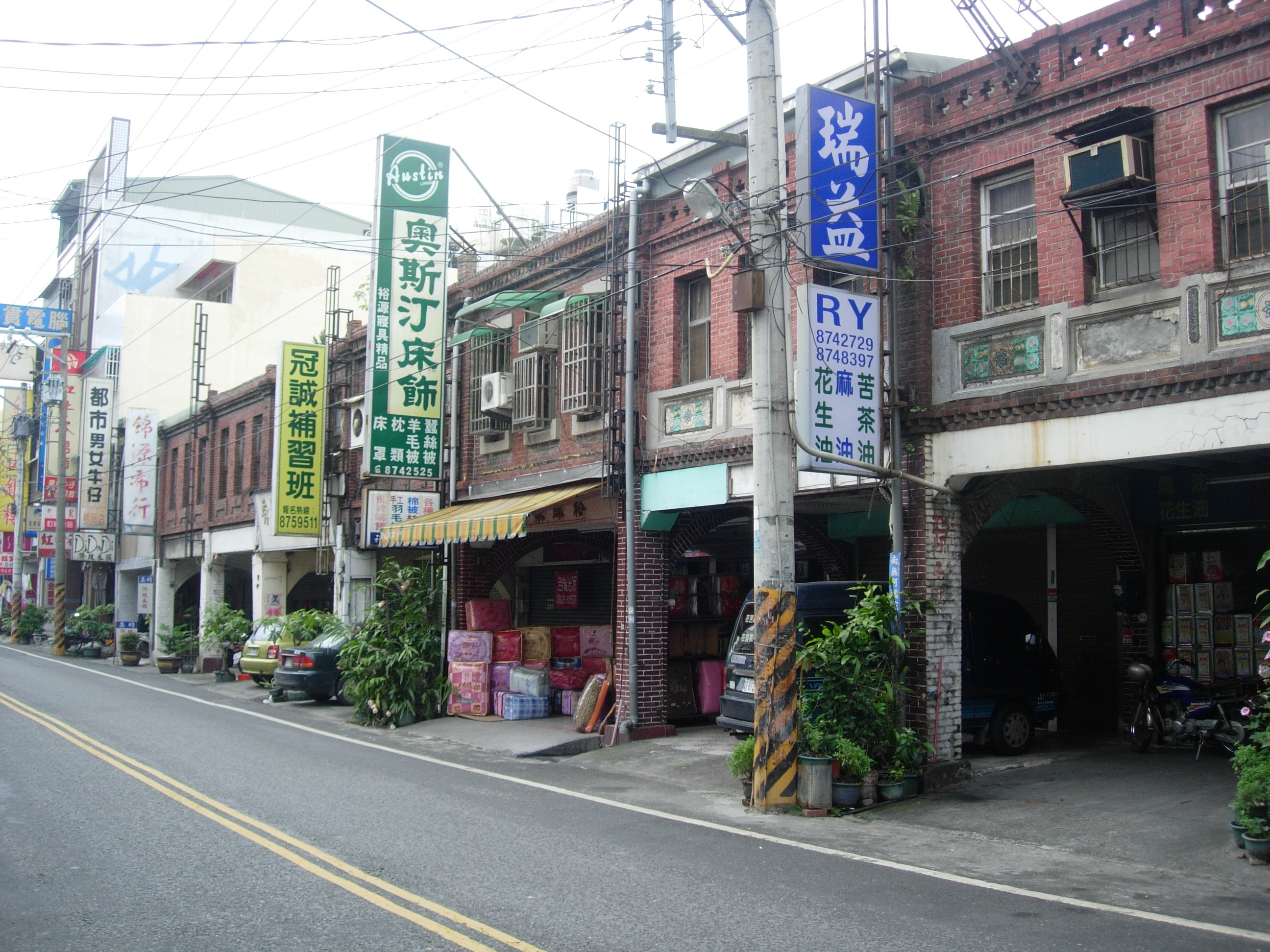

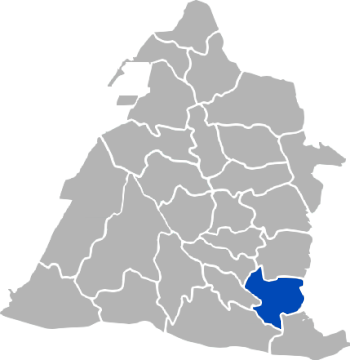
- Tianzhong Township in Changhua County
- Location: Changhua County, Taiwan

Area
  - Total: 35 km^{2} (14 sq mi)

Population (January 2023)
  - Total: 39,701
  - Density: 1,100/km^{2} (2,900/sq mi)
- Website: town.chcg.gov.tw/tianzhong (in Chinese)

Tianzhong Township
- Chinese: 田中鎮
- Hanyu Pinyin: Tiánzhōng Zhèn
- Wade–Giles: Tien^{2}chung^{1} Chen^{4}
- Pha̍k-fa-sṳ: Thièn-chûng-chṳ́n
- Hokkien POJ: Chhân-tiong-tìn

Tianzhong Township is an urban township located at eastern Changhua County, Taiwan. Its former name (田中央; Chhân-tiong-ng) and current name (田中) make reference to the origin of the town in the center of rice paddies.

== Geography ==
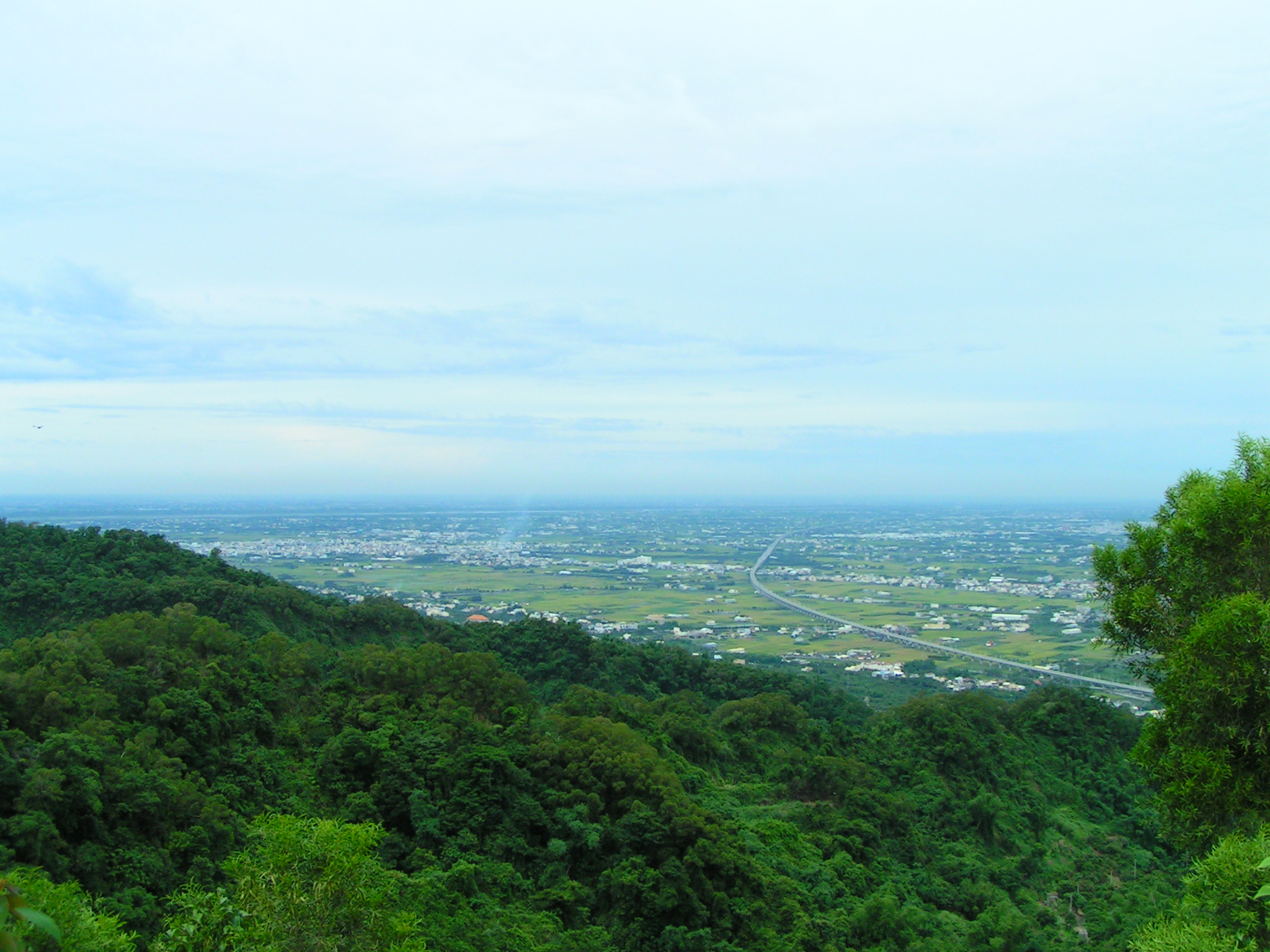
Aerial view of Tianzhong from the Bagua Mountain Range

Tianzhong encompasses 34.61 km^{2} (13.36 sq mi) with a population of 39,701 as of January 2023. Most of the township is part of Changhua Plain, with the Bagua Mountain Range to the east.

== Administrative divisions ==
The township comprises 22 villages: Beilu, Bifeng, Dalun, Dashe, Dingtan, Fuxing, Longtan, Meizhou, Nanlu, Pinghe, Sanan, Sanguang, Sanmin, Shalun, Tunglu, Tungyuan, Xiangshan, Xilu, Xinmin, Xinzhuang, Zhonglu and Zhongtan.

== Festivals ==
- Clay Sculpture Festival

== Transportation ==
=== Rail ===
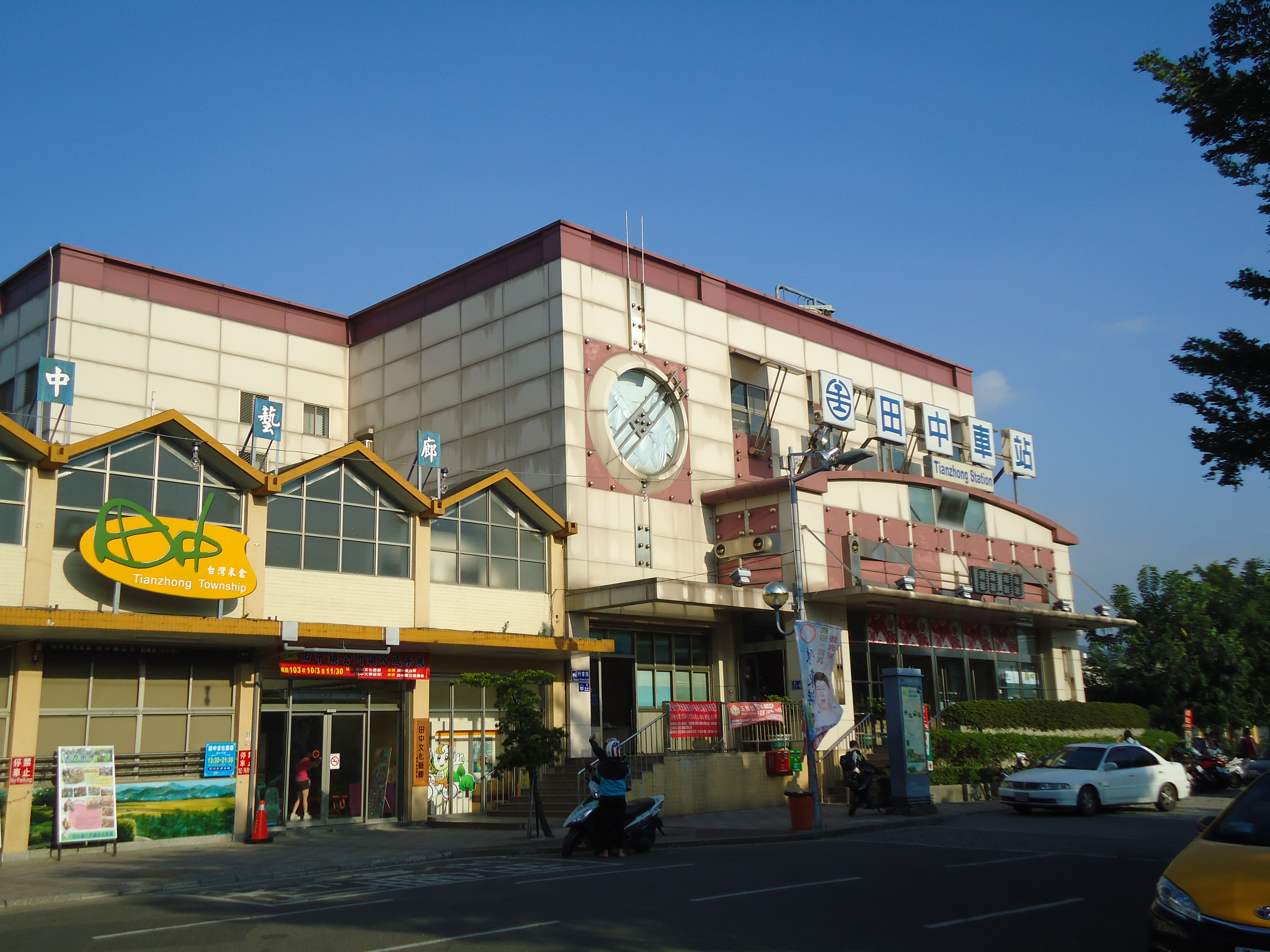
Tianzhong Rail Station

- THSR Changhua Station
- TR Tianzhong Station

=== Bus ===
- Tianzhong Bus Station of Changhua Bus
- Tianzhong Bus Station of Yuanlin Bus

== Notable natives ==
- Cho Po-yuan, Magistrate of Changhua County (2005-2014)
- Huang Jong-tsun, President of Examination Yuan
- Richie Jen, actor and singer
