= Changhua Station =

Changhua station (Chinese: 彰化車站; pinyin: Zhānghùa chēzhàn) may refer to the following stations in Changhua County, Taiwan:

- Changhua HSR station, a Taiwan High Speed Rail station in Tianzhong, opened in 2015
- Changhua railway station, a TRA station on the Taichung line in Changhua City, opened in 1905
