= Taiwan High Speed Rail =

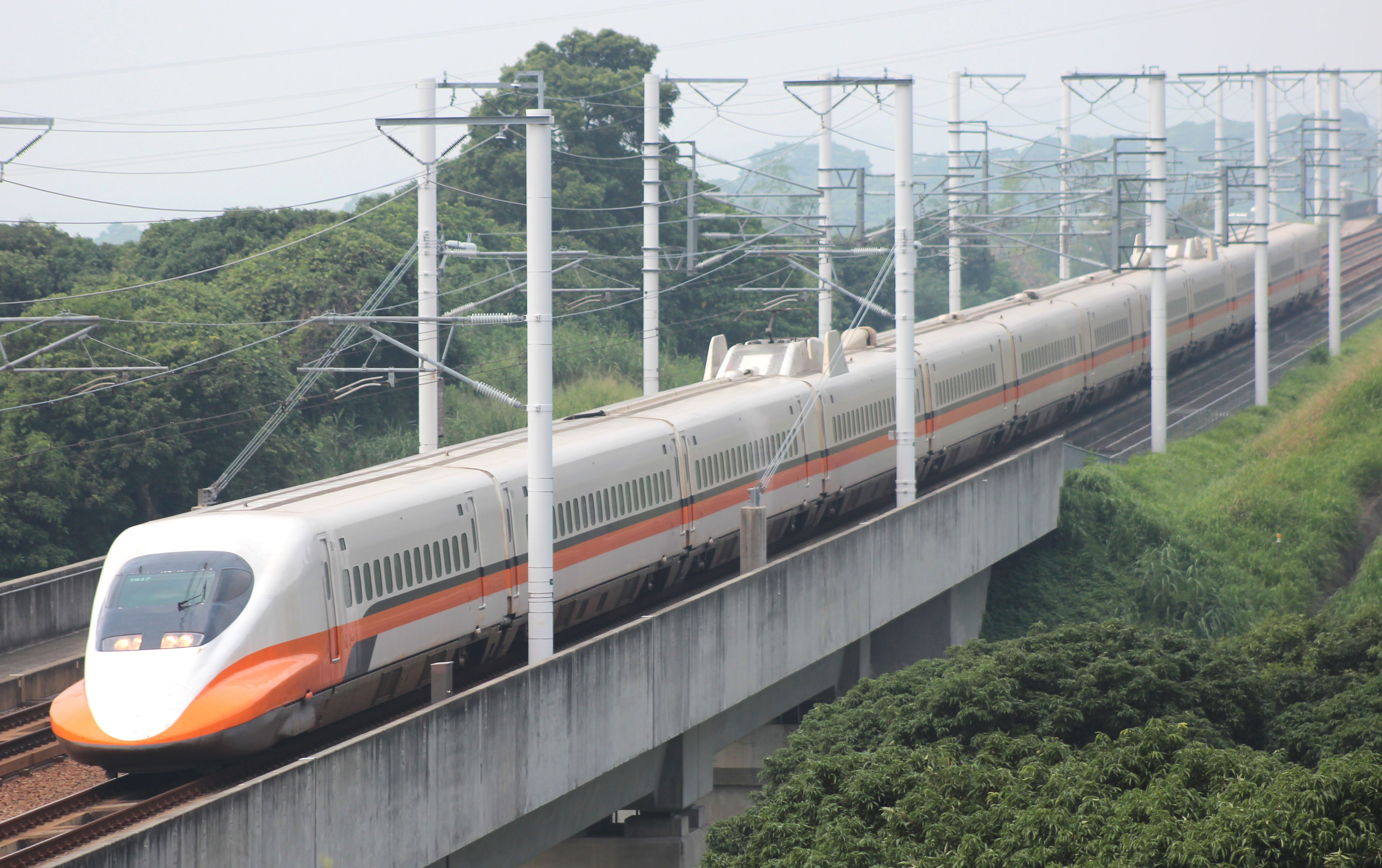
- A THSR 700T train running Taiwan High Speed Rail line

Overview
- Native name: 台灣高鐵
- Owner: Taiwan High Speed Rail Corporation (Note: under a BOT concession until 2067)
- Area served: Taiwan (main island only)
- Transit type: High-speed railway
- Number of lines: 1
- Number of stations: 12
- Annual ridership: 82,070,618（2025) ▲4.9%
- Website: thsrc.com.tw

Operation
- Began operation: January 5, 2007; 19 years ago
- Operator: Taiwan High Speed Rail Corporation
- Character: Elevated, underground, at-grade

Technical
- System length: 350 km (217 mi)
- No. of tracks: 2
- Track gauge: 1,435 mm (4 ft 8 1/2 in) standard gauge
- Electrification: 25 kV 60 Hz AC from overhead catenary
- Top speed: 300 km/h (186 mph)
System map
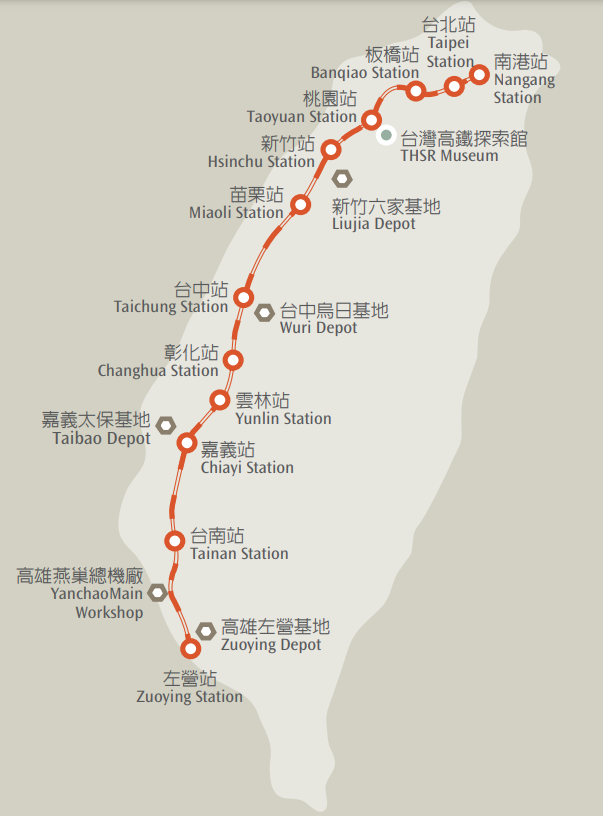

Taiwan High Speed Rail
- Traditional Chinese: 台灣高速鐵路
- Simplified Chinese: 台湾高速铁路
Transcriptions
Standard Mandarin
- Hanyu Pinyin: Táiwān gāosù tiělù
Southern Min
- Hokkien POJ: Tâi-oân Ko-sok Thih-lō͘
- Tâi-lô: Tâi-uân Ko-sok Thih-lōo

Alternative Chinese name
- Traditional Chinese: 台灣高鐵
- Simplified Chinese: 台湾高铁
- Literal meaning: "Taiwan high rail"
Transcriptions
Standard Mandarin
- Hanyu Pinyin: Táiwān gāotiě
Southern Min
- Hokkien POJ: Tâi-oân Ko-thih
- Tâi-lô: Tâi-uân Ko-thih

Taiwan High Speed Rail (THSR; Chinese: 台灣高鐵) is a high-speed railway network in Taiwan, which consists of a single line that runs approximately 350 km (217 mi) along the western coast of the island, from Taipei in the north to the southern city of Kaohsiung. Its construction was managed by a private company, Taiwan High Speed Rail Corporation (THSRC), which also operates the line. The total cost of the project was NT$513.3 billion in 1998. The system's technology is based primarily on Japan's Shinkansen.

The railway opened for service on 5 January 2007, with trains running at a top speed of 300 km/h (186 mph). Trains make the trip from Nangang to Zuoying in as little as 1 hour and 45 minutes. Most intermediate stations on the line lie outside the cities served; however, a variety of transfer options, such as free shuttle buses, conventional rail, and metros have been constructed to facilitate transport connections.

Ridership initially fell short of forecasts, but grew from fewer than 40,000 passengers per day in the first few months of operation to over 129,000 passengers per day in June 2013. Daily passenger traffic reached 130,000 in 2014, well below the forecast of 240,000 daily passengers for 2008. The system had carried over 400 million passengers by December 2016.

In the initial years of operation, THSRC accumulated high debts due to high depreciation charges and interest, largely due to the financial structure set up for the private company. In 2009, THSRC negotiated with the government to change the method of depreciation from depending on concessions on rights to ridership. At the same time, the government also started to help refinance THSRC's loans to assist the company so it could remain operational and profitable. The government injected NT$30 billion as a financial bailout, boosting the government's stake to about 64% from about 37%. The government also extended the rail concession from 35 years to 70 years and terminated the company's build-operate-transfer business model.

== History ==
Taiwan's rapid economic growth during the latter half of the twentieth century led to congestion of highways, conventional rail, and air traffic systems in the western transport corridor, which threatened to impede the region's development. The idea of a new high-speed rail line arose in the 1970s, and informal planning began in 1980. In 1987, the executive branch of Taiwan's government, the Executive Yuan, instructed the Ministry of Transportation to launch a feasibility study for a high-speed rail line in the western Taiwan corridor, which was completed in 1990. The study found that in a comparison of potential solutions to traffic problems in the corridor, a high-speed rail line would offer the highest transit volume, lowest land use, highest energy savings, and least pollution. In July 1990 the Preparation Office of High Speed Rail (POHSR) was established and a route was selected in 1991. Plans for the THSR were subsequently approved by the Executive Yuan in June 1992 and by Taiwan's legislature, the Legislative Yuan, in 1993.

=== Build-operate-transfer ===
In November 1994, Taiwan passed a law regarding the use of private finance in infrastructure projects, which also applied to the up-to-then state-run THSR project. Consequently, in 1995, POHSR was transformed into the Bureau of High Speed Rail (BOHSR), which started to tender THSR as a build-operate-transfer (BOT) scheme in October 1996.

The bidding process pitted Taiwan High Speed Rail Consortium (THSRC) against the Chunghwa High Speed Rail Consortium (CHSRC). THSRC's bid was based on the high-speed technology platform of Eurotrain, a joint venture between GEC-Alsthom, the main maker of the French TGV, and Siemens, the main maker of the German ICE, while CHSRC's bid was based on Japanese Shinkansen technology supplied by Taiwan Shinkansen Consortium (TSC), a joint venture of Japanese companies. THSRC, which submitted the lower bid and promised to build the line with zero net cost from the government, was chosen as the preferred bidder in September 1996. The group was renamed and formally established as the Taiwan High Speed Rail Corporation (THSRC) in May 1998. THSRC and the government signed the BOT agreement on 23 July 1998.

However, controversy arose during rolling-stock selection. In May 1999, as THSRC faced difficulties in raising capital, the government of Japan promised soft loans if THSRC switched to TSC. Although Eurotrain promised to match TSC's financial proposal, the Eschede train disaster in combination with TSC offering the newer 700 Series Shinkansen, convinced THSRC to reopen its core system bid, ultimately resulting in TSC selected as the preferred rolling-stock supplier in December 1999. Although Eurotrain eventually conceded in the bid, it filed for a US$800 million damage claim against THSRC at the Singapore International Arbitration Centre in February 2001. After a lengthy arbitration process, the court ruled in March 2004 that THSRC should pay a compensation for the US$32.4 million Eurotrain spent on development and US$35.7 million for unjust enrichment. THSRC agreed to pay US$65 million (US$89 million with interest) to Eurotrain in November 2004.

=== Construction ===
Construction of the line by THSRC officially started in March 1999. Tunnels and other major civil engineering works were completed by 2004, along with the first delivery of the 700T trains. Testing and commissioning of the line then took place in 2005 and 2006, with a maximum testing speed of 315 kilometres per hour (196 mph) achieved in October 2005.

=== Opening ===
The railway was opened in 2007, with limited commercial services between Banqiao and Zuoying stations from 5 January, with full service from Taipei Station to Kaohsiung from May 2007.

Three additional stations located along the line – Miaoli, Changhua and Yunlin – opened in 2015.

=== Future plans ===
==== Southern extension ====
On 10 September 2019, the Executive Yuan announced that the railway would be expanded to Pingtung. Out of four proposed route options, it was confirmed on 27 September that the expansion would bypass central Kaohsiung, branching from Zuoying east towards western Pingtung City, near Liukuaicuo, with an estimated cost of NT$55.4 billion. Although lowest in cost, the option was met with criticism regarding its economic benefits.

The extension to Pingtung was approved by Premier Su Tseng-chang in January 2023, with opening of the extension planned for 2029.

On 28 December 2024, Executive Yuan announced that the extension route would be altered to pass through the city centre with a stop at Kaohsiung Main Station.

==== Northern extension ====
The line was extended 9.2 km (5.7 mi) from Taipei to Nangang, opening in July 2016.

On 25 October 2019, the Railway Bureau published an assessment report to extend the line further from Taipei to Yilan, cutting travel time to 13 minutes. The 56.4 km (35.0 mi) extension was approved in October 2020, and is planned to open by 2030.

== Rolling stock ==
=== THSR 700T ===
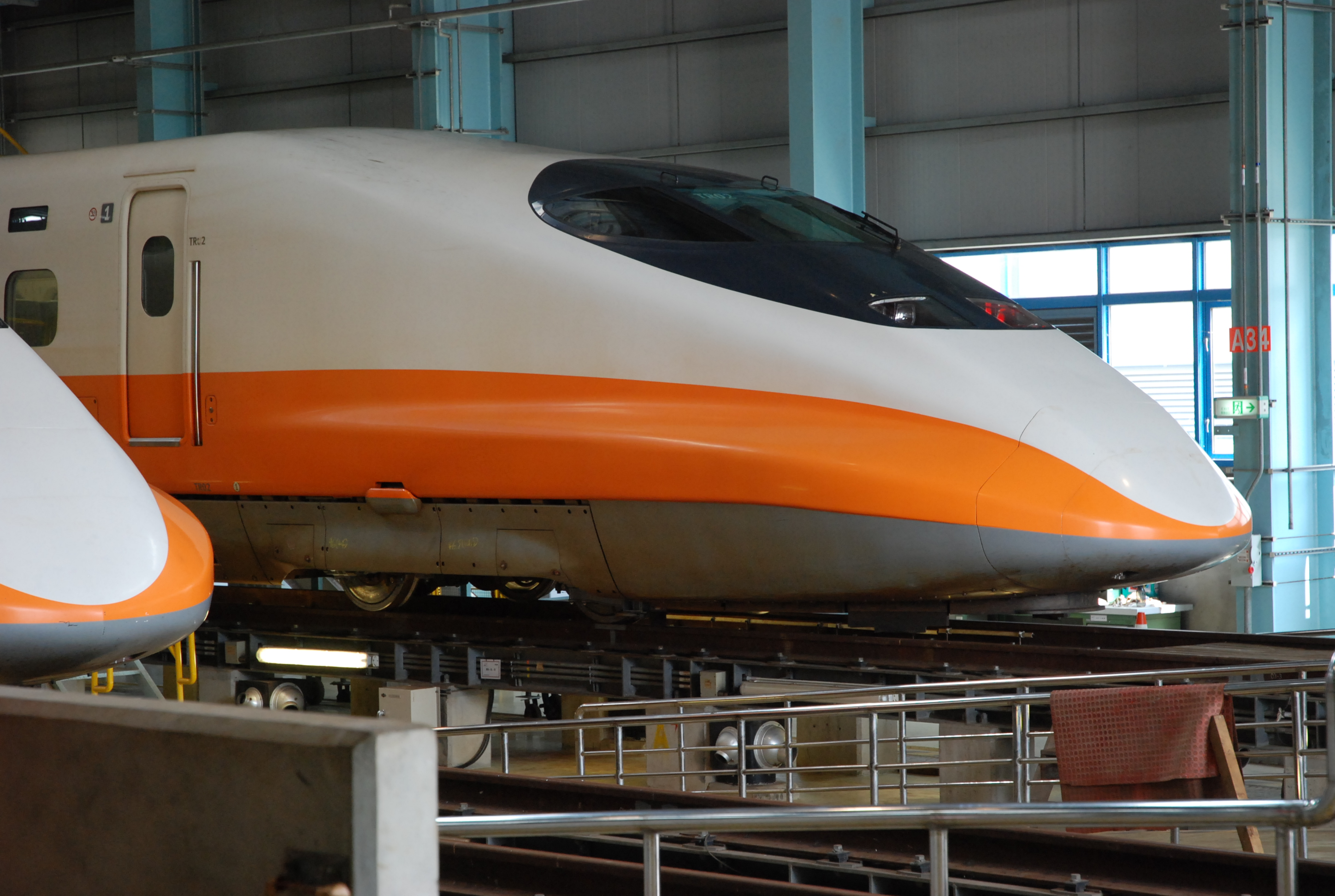
Nose profile of the 700T train

Taiwan High Speed Rail started operations with 30 THSR 700T trainsets supplied by a consortium led by Kawasaki Heavy Industries. In response to increasing ridership and new stations that would begin operation in 2015, THSRC signed a contract for four new 700T trainsets with the Kawasaki consortium in May 2012 in Tokyo. The four additional trainsets were delivered to Taiwan by 12 August 2015.

The THSR 700T trainset is based on the 700 Series Shinkansen trainset used by JR Central and JR West in Japan. This marked the first time Shinkansen technology was exported to a foreign country, and it involved "rolling stock derived from a JR Central design running on both the European and Japanese track systems." Customization was focused on adapting to Taiwan's climate and geography, and the nose shape was optimized for tunnels wider than those in Japan.

The maximum service speed of the trains was raised from the 700 Series Shinkansen's 285 to 300 km/h (177 to 186 mph). The 12 cars of a 700T train are grouped in three traction units with three power cars and one trailer each, providing 10.26 MW (13,760 hp) of power; both end cars are trailers to avoid slip on powered bogies. The train is 304 m (997 ft 5 in) long and has a mass of 503 t (554 short tons) when empty. The trains have a passenger capacity of 989 seats in two classes: 66 seats in 2+2 configuration in the single Business Car and 923 seats in 2+3 configuration in the eleven Standard Cars. The per capita energy consumption of a fully loaded 700T train is 16% of that of private cars and half that of buses; carbon dioxide emissions are 11% of private cars and a quarter that of buses.

=== N700ST ===
First set of N700ST arriving at Port of Kaohsiung

In the late 2010s, THSRC began work to purchase additional high speed trains, in light of growing demand. Twelve trains were planned to order at a cost of around NT$30 billion, yet the limited number of Japanese companies that build Shinkansen rolling stock took several years for THSRC to agree a deal. In 2022, it was reported that THSRC was speaking to European train manufacturers instead, as the price offered by Japanese companies was "unreasonable".

In March 2023, it was announced that a joint bid by Hitachi and Toshiba had been awarded the contract. Twelve trains were ordered at a cost of around NT$28 billion, which would be built based on the N700S Series, the latest generation of Shinkansen train at the time of order. The contract was officially signed in May, with a supplementary agreement concluded in March 2025. The first set of the new trains was expected to arrive at Taiwan in the second half of 2026, and would enter revenue service in the second half of 2027.

On 20 August 2025, the THSRC announced that the new trains are officially known as N700ST series. The THSRC further clarified that the first set of the new trains was expected to arrive at Taiwan in August 2026, where tests would take place thereafter.

=== Engineering trains ===
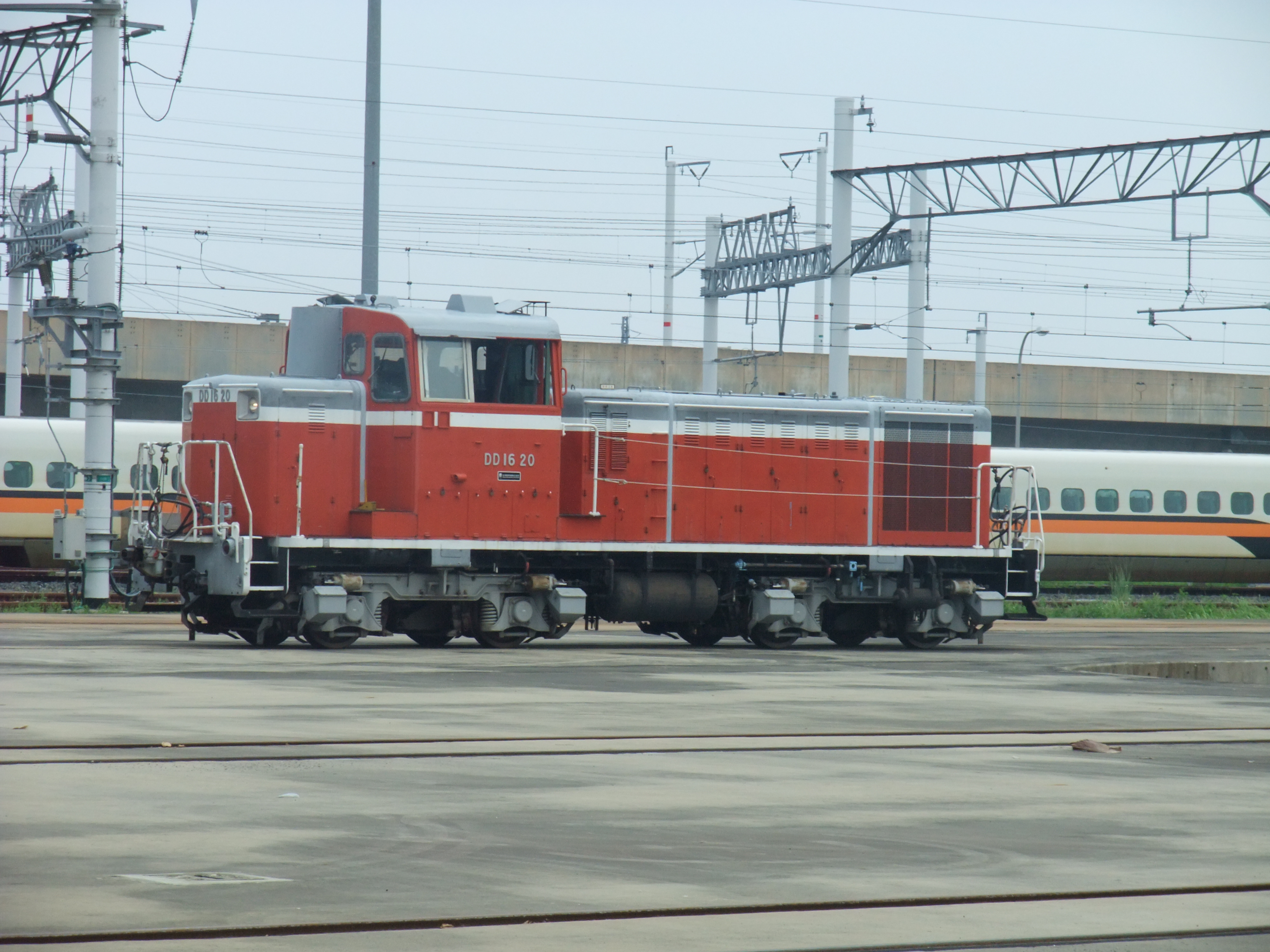
The DD16 locomotive as used by THSRC

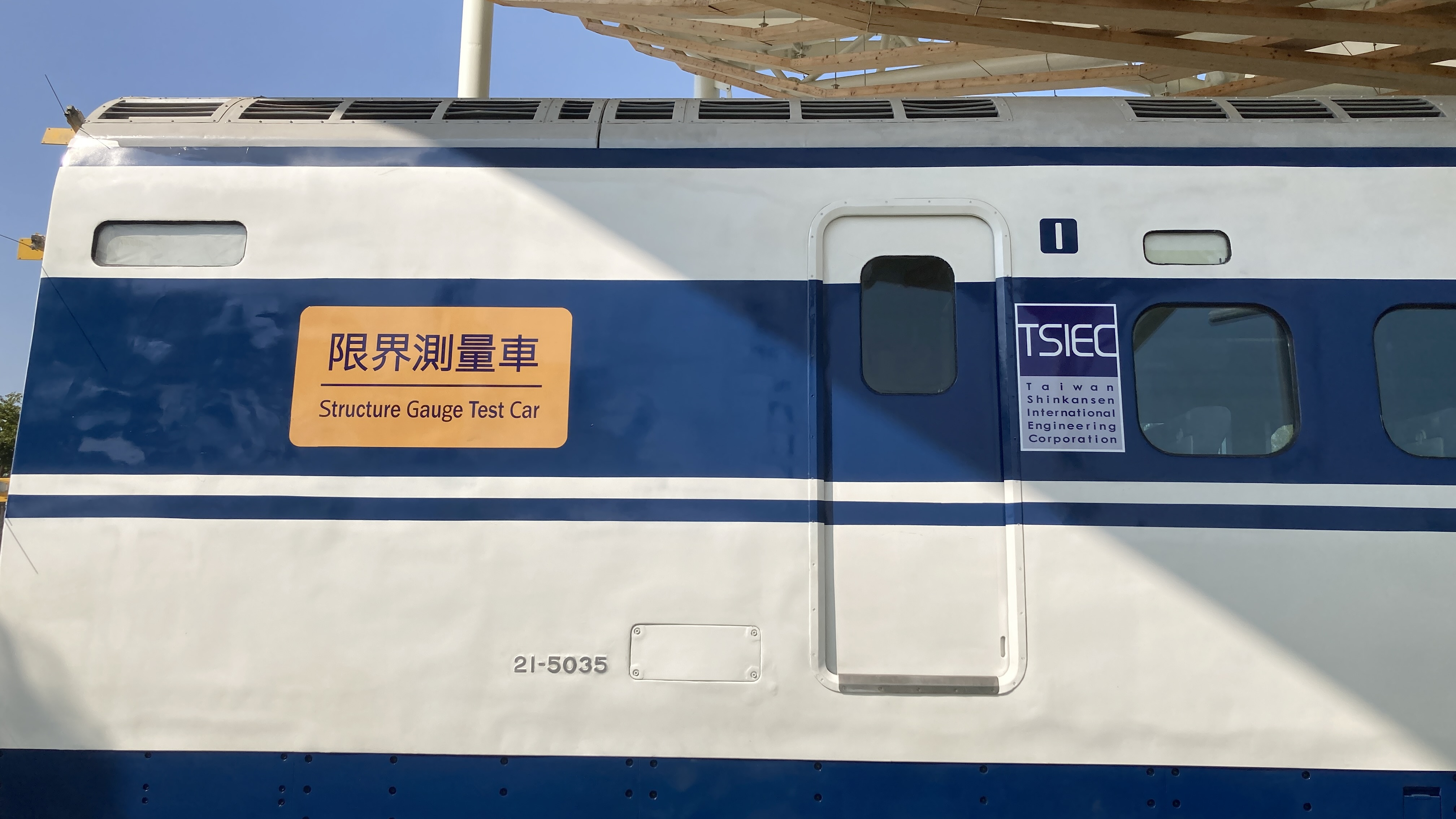
The former 0 series end car used for clearance checking

THSRC uses overhead line inspection trains from Windhoff, Harsco railgrinders, Plasser & Theurer track tampers, and several ex-JR rolling stock to maintain its line. Among the latter include the JNR Class DD14 and JNR Class DD16 diesel-hydraulic locomotives, which were originally used for snowploughing by JR. The two ex-JR locomotives with THSRC are equipped with Shinkansen-style rotary couplers and standard-gauge bogies instead of the original 1,067 mm (3 ft 6 in) gauge bogies and knuckle couplers and are used for shunting the 700T trainsets within the depot. THSRC also uses a former 0 Series Shinkansen end car as a structure gauge test car.

== Operation ==
As the first high speed railway system in Taiwan, THSRC started operation in 2007 with many foreign employees, including French and German train drivers and operation controllers in the Operation Control Center (OCC). At the same time, THSRC also started to train local drivers and controllers. Since May 2008, all controllers working in the OCC have been Taiwanese, and since October 2008, all train drivers have been Taiwanese.

The OCC's main responsibility is to maintain safe train operations. THSRC has 132 controllers (July 2012), of which about one quarter are female, working 24 hours per day and 365 days per year in the OCC. Requirements for becoming a Chief Controller (主任控制員) include experience in all nine OCC positions, 300-hours of on-the-job training and acquiring qualification.

As of July 2012, THSRC has 144 drivers, of which almost 10% are female. All driver candidates must spend 8 months completing 1,326 hours of professional training and pass the National Certification before they can drive the train. In addition, after becoming a certified high-speed train driver, they undergo further on-the-job training at least three times each year in order to guarantee they can drive the train safely.

=== Natural disasters ===
Taiwan frequently faces multiple types of natural disasters, including typhoons, earthquakes, heavy rainfall, floods, and landslides. For this reason, a primary focus of THSRC's infrastructure design was how to respond to natural disasters such as earthquakes and how to ensure safety for all passengers and trains in any emergency situation.

THSRC has established a system to respond to natural disasters and unexpected intrusion onto the right-of-way, called DWS (Disaster Warning Systems). This system consists of a network of sensors installed along the rail route to detect unexpected situations such as earthquakes, strong winds, heavy rainfall, floods, landslides, and intrusions. In case of an unexpected situation, the DWS will send signals to the OCC (Operation Control Center) immediately; it will also activate contingency measures to ensure the safety of the passengers and trains, including decelerating or stopping trains in the affected area.

The DWS has functioned successfully since its initial operation in 2007. The most powerful earthquake that THSRC has experienced measured 6.4 on the Richter Scale with an epicenter 17 km (11 mi) from Jiaxian, Kaohsiung that shook southern Taiwan on 4 March 2010 (甲仙地震). One operating train was slightly derailed in Sinshih, Tainan, and six trains were stopped on the track. In spite of the temporary suspension of operations, there was no damage or casualties. All 2,500 affected passengers were evacuated in two hours without injury. Service resumed the next day. Such a record was well noted, and provided valuable experience in operational safety to the global railway industry.

In April 2010, it was reported that subsidence had been observed during construction on a 6 km (3.7 mi) viaduct section in Yunlin County. The subsidence continued, reaching up to 55 cm (22 in) over seven years. By 2010 subsidence had slowed, which was ascribed to the closure of some deep groundwater wells operating in the region. Although the situation was deemed safe with differential settlement between adjacent piers along the viaduct at only a sixth of the permissible level, the BOHSR urged the closure of more wells. On 25 July 2011, the government announced plans to close almost 1,000 wells in Changhua and Yunlin counties, reducing the amount of water pumped from deep wells by 210,000,000 tonnes (2.1×10^{11} kg) by 2021.

== Service ==
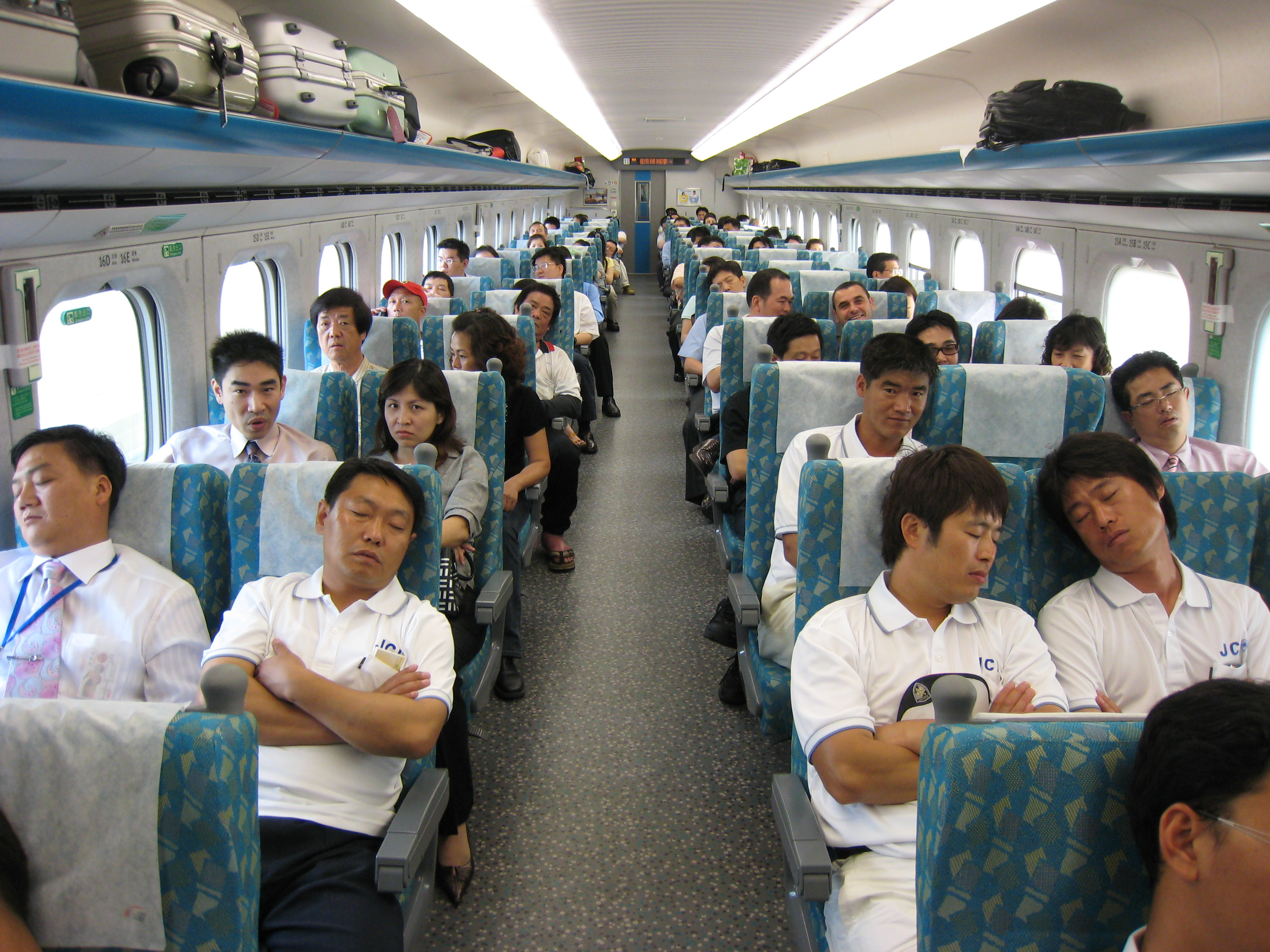
Standard car riders on a northbound train

According to THSR's July 2018 timetable, there are 989 train services per week of operation, with operation times between 05:50 to 24:00 every day. Most southbound trains originate from Nangang station and most northbound trains originate from Zuoying; however, a few trains operate just between Nangang and Taichung or between Taichung and Zuoying. Southbound trains are designated by odd train numbers, and northbound trains by even train numbers.

Each train consists of one business car (car 6) and 11 standard cars (including reserved seats and non-reserved seats). Since July 2010, non-reserved seats are available in cars 10 through 12 (some trains have additional non-reserved seats available in other cars). Car 7 of each train is fitted with four wheelchair accessible seats and an accessible restroom. Passengers can call THSR's Customer Service Hot Line at (Taiwan) 4066-3000 or visit any THSR station ticket window to reserve these seats.

By August 2012, implementation of 4G WiMAX on-board trains is expected to provide smooth wireless broadband services, making THSR the first high-speed ground transportation system equipped with this service.

In 2012, THSRC rated highly in the CommonWealth Magazine (天下雜誌) "Golden Service Award survey" (金牌服務大賞), not only far outpacing all rivals in the "long-distance land transport" category, but also taking the top spot in the overall rankings of 300 industries.

=== Local connections ===
To improve local public transit connections to THSR stations, the TRA built two new spur lines branching off from West Coast Line.

- Shalun Line for Tainan opened on 2 January 2011,
- Liujia Line for Hsinchu opened on 11 November 2011.

Code		Name	Chinese	Taiwanese	Hakka	Connecting services and notes	Distance (km)	Type	Location	
NAG	01	Nangang	南港	Lâm-káng	Nàm-kóng	Western Trunk line Bannan Line	−3.2	underground	Nangang	Taipei
TPE	02	Taipei	台北	Tâi-pak	Thòi-pet	Western Trunk line Tamsui–Xinyi Line; Bannan Line; Taoyuan Airport MRT (A1)	6.1	underground	Zhongzheng	Taipei
BAQ	03	Banqiao	板橋	Pang-kiô	Piông-khièu	Western Trunk line Bannan Line; Circular Line	13.1	underground	Banqiao	New Taipei
TAY	04	Taoyuan	桃園	Thô-hn̂g	Thò-yèn	Taoyuan Airport MRT; Airport Shuttle Bus	42.3	underground	Zhongli	Taoyuan
HSC	05	Hsinchu	新竹	Sin-tek	Sîn-tsuk	Liujia line (Liujia)	72.2	elevated	Zhubei	Hsinchu
MIL	06	Miaoli	苗栗	Biâu-le̍k	Mèu-li̍t	Taichung line (Fengfu)	104.9	elevated	Houlong	Miaoli
TAC	07	Taichung	台中	Tâi-tiong	Thòi-chûng	Taichung line (Xinwuri); Green line	165.7	elevated	Wuri	Taichung
CHH	08	Changhua	彰化	Chiong-hoà	Chông-fa		193.9	elevated	Tianzhong	Changhua
YUL	09	Yunlin	雲林	Hûn-lîm	Yùn-lìm		218.5	elevated	Huwei	Yunlin
CHY	10	Chiayi	嘉義	Ka-gī	Kâ-ngi	Chiayi BRT	251.6	elevated	Taibao	Chiayi
TAN	11	Tainan	台南	Tâi-lâm	Thòi-nàm	Shalun line (Shalun)	313.9	elevated	Gueiren	Tainan
ZUY	12	Zuoying	左營	Chó-iâⁿ	Chó-yàng	Western Trunk line (Xinzuoying); Red line (Zuoying/THSR)	345.2	ground level	Zuoying	Kaohsiung

=== Stop patterns ===
With a few exceptions, the services follow the below pattern.

Code (Note: These codes are used for statistical purposes.)	Number (Note: 3-digit numbers indicate daily services, while 4-digit numbers indicate services on particular days of a week.)	Category	Nangang	Taipei	Banqiao	Taoyuan	Hsinchu	Miaoli	Taichung	Changhua	Yunlin	Chiayi	Tainan	Zuoying	Service proportion
D	6xx, 16xx, 17xx	Semi-fast train (frog mode)	●	●	●	●	●	－	●	－	－	●	●	●	36.0%
D	696, 1712	Semi-fast train (frog mode)	N/A	●	●	●	●	－	●	－	－	●	●	●	36.0%
F	8xx, 18xx, 88xx	Stopping train	●	●	●	●	●	●	●	●	●	●	●	●	22.7%
B	1xx, 1103	Fast train (direct to Zuoying)	●	●	●	－	－	－	●	－	－	－	－	●	20.5%
B'	2xx, 12xx	Fast train (call at Tainan Mode)	●	●	●	－	－	－	●	－	－	－	●	●	8.9%
B'	203	Fast train (call at Tainan Mode)	N/A	●	●	－	－	－	●	－	－	●	●	●	8.9%
B'	1202	Fast train (call at Tainan Mode)	●	●	－	－	－	－	●	－	－	●	●	●	8.9%
B'	1293	Fast train (call at Tainan Mode)	●	●	●	－	－	－	●	－	－	●	●	●	8.9%
E	5xx, 15xx, 85xx	Stopping train (interval-local mode, Terminal is Taichung) (Note: This train service is mainly extra-service between at Nangang or Taipei to Taichung Service Interval (Service 3541, 3545 and 3553 is applicable on Friday, is only between at Taipei to Taichung Service Interval), section between at Nangang to Taichung Services has 9-car non-reserved cars (Car 1-4&8-12), the between at Taichung to Zuoying Service Interval is only single-round trip (Service 583 and 598), because overlapping the Taoyuan Airport Limited Express Service (Service 295, 300, 333 and 13xx) with between at Taichung to Zuoying Interval is All-Stop Pattern.)	●	●	●	●	●	●	●	N/A					8.59%
E	3541, 3545, 3553	Stopping train (interval-local mode, Terminal is Taichung)	N/A	●	●	●	●	●	●	N/A					8.59%
E	1575	Stopping train (interval-local mode, Terminal is Taichung)	●	●	－	●	●	－	●	N/A					8.59%
E	583, 598, 158x, 159x	Stopping train (interval-local mode, Terminal is Taichung)	N/A						●	●	●	●	●	●	0.01%
C	295	Taoyuan Airport Limited Express (call at Taoyuan, but skip Banqiao) (Note: This train service is mainly extra-service between at Taichung to Zuoying Service Interval is All-Stop Pattern (Service 295 is only stop at Chiayi, Tainan and Zuoying Stations on between at Taichung to Zuoying Service Interval), the between at Nangang to Taichung Service Interval is only stop at Nangang, Taipei, Taoyuan and Taichung Stations, section Taoyuan Airport Limited Express Services has 5-car non-reserved cars (Car 8-12).)	●	●	－	●	－	－	●	－	－	●	●	●	3.2%
C	3xx, 13xx, 83xx	Taoyuan Airport Limited Express (call at Taoyuan, but skip Banqiao)	●	●	－	●	－	－	●	●	●	●	●	●	3.2%
A	1985	Super-fast train (skip Taichung)	●	●	●	－	－	－	－	－	－	－	●	●	0.001%
as of February 2026; ●: Trains stop at station; －: Trains skip station

=== Ticket fare and discount ===
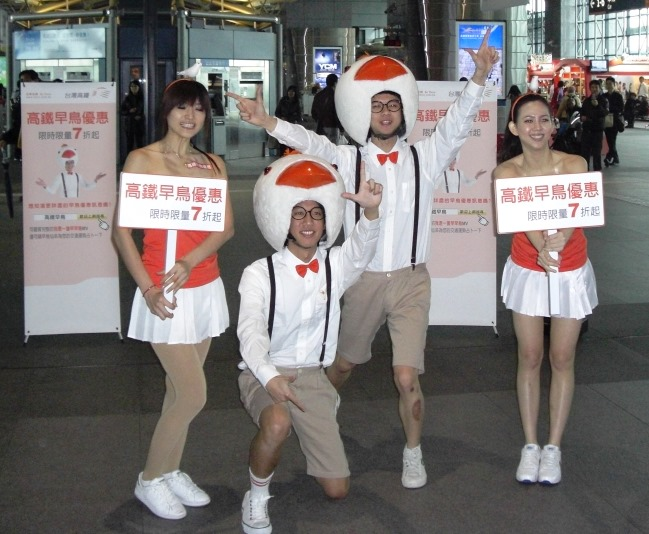
THSRC Early Bird Ticket promotion event, 2011

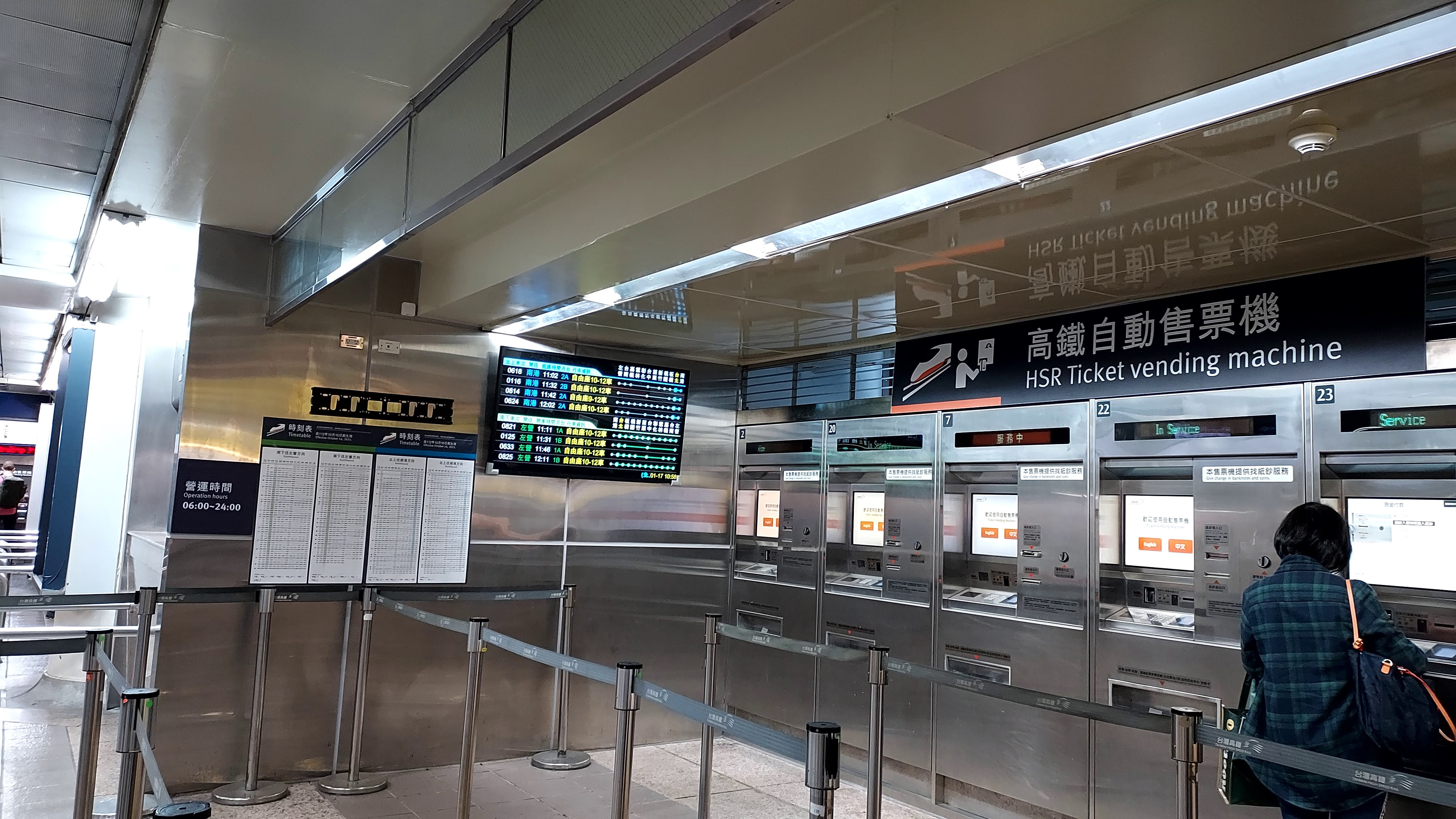
Ticket vending machine in Taipei Main Station

As of January 2018, a one-way Taipei–Zuoying trip, a THSR standard car adult ticket is NT$1490, and a business car ticket fare is NT$1950. The cost of a non-reserved seat is approximately 3% less than the regular price. Business and standard car reserved ticket reservations are available 28 days prior to the date of departure (including the departure day).

Senior citizens (Taiwan citizens above 65 years of age), registered disabled persons plus one accompanying passenger (Taiwan citizens only), and children (passengers under 12 years of age) are eligible for concession (half price) tickets, whereas University students enrolled at Taiwanese Universities, including international/exchange students, are eligible for discounts ranging from 5% to 50% off the regular/early bird price on certain trains (typically either 12% or 25% off), subject to student ID checks.

A group discount is offered for groups of 11 or more. A group discount cannot be used in combination with other discount offers and does not include non-reserved seats. Passengers eligible for multiple discounts can only choose one discount offer.

Since 1 July 2010, a smart card system has provided frequent travelers with multi-ride (eight trips) or periodic tickets. THSR's contact-less smart cards allow the cardholder to travel between specific stations within a given time period for a certain number of rides. The card is sold in registered (name-bearing) form. Only adult tickets are available in this format, and cannot be used for rides between Banqiao and Nangang.

After purchasing or adding value to a multi-ride card, the card balance is valid for 45 days counted from the day of first use. The ticket is good for 8 rides. The multi-ride card provides a discount of about 21% off the full fare of a reserved Standard Seat. Non-registered and registered multi-ride tickets can be purchased at the ticket windows of all THSRC stations. Upon first purchase of a multi-ride ticket, a card deposit fee of NT$100 is required (refundable if the card is returned). The registered multi-ride ticket is limited to personal use by the registered cardholder.

Since November 2012, an Early Bird discount of 35% has been offered for a limited number of tickets sold no later than 8 days before the departure date. If the 35% off tickets sell out before the deadline, tickets with a discount of 20% off are offered. If these tickets sell out before the deadline, tickets with a discount of 10% off are offered. If all early bird tickets are sold out, then full fare tickets are offered.

=== Train frequency ===
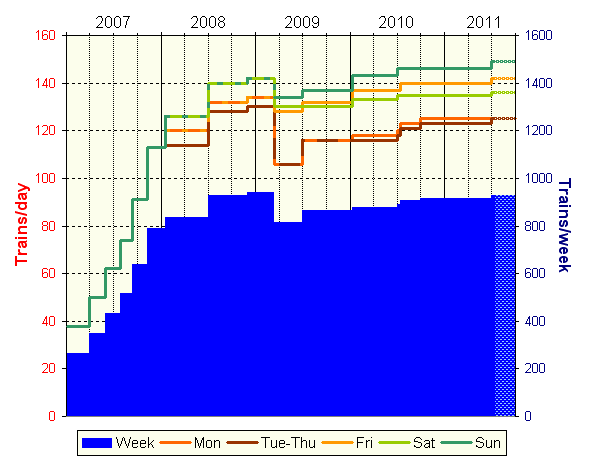
Daily, weekly frequency of normal scheduled THSRC train services. Extra trains during holidays and cancellations due to extraordinary events not shown.

Train frequencies in timetable valid from 8 October 2018
Direction	Trains per day							Trains per week
Direction	Mon	Tue	Wed	Thu	Fri	Sat	Sun	Trains per week
Southbound	63	64			82	75	76	488
Northbound	69	68			80	70	86	509
Both directions	132				162	145	162	997

THSRC operates additional train services during national holidays. On 29 June 2011, a proposal by THSRC to increase the maximum number of train services to 210 per day (compared to the existing 175 per day) passed an environmental impact assessment, increasing the number of possible services on "high-load days".

=== Ridership ===
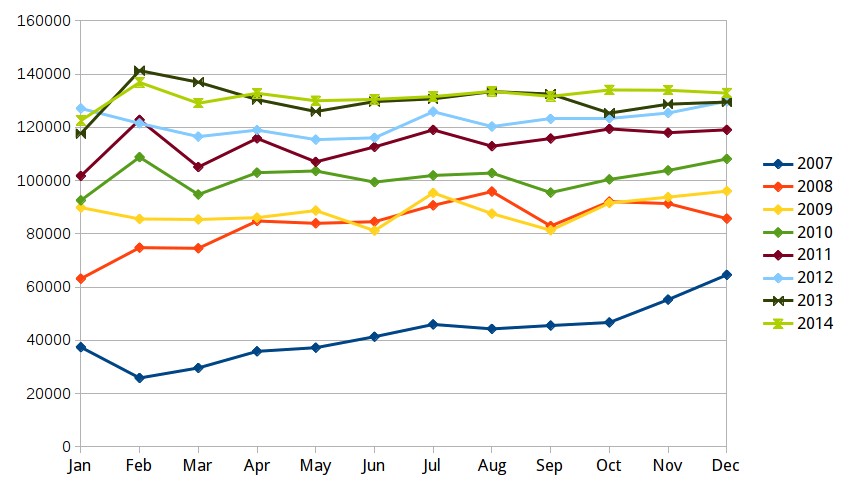
Monthly averages of daily THSRC ridership

Original estimates predicted a daily ridership of 180,000 after launch, growing to 400,000 by 2036. In view of a 50% drop in airline passengers due to the 1997 Asian financial crisis, forecasts were revised downwards. The final initial ridership estimate was 140,000 passengers per day. Actual initial ridership did not match these projections. In September 2007, six months after opening, THSRC carried 1.5 million passengers monthly, translating to about 50,000 passengers daily. In the second year, passenger numbers almost doubled. In the third year, average daily ridership continued to grow to 88,000 passengers per day, jumping to over 120,000 passengers per day in 2012. (updated to September 2012) Seat occupancy was around 45% in the first three years, with a modest improvement achieved in 2009, and reached 53.91% in 2012. (updated to September 2012) Punctuality is stable above 99%.

Annual traffic figures
Year	Ridership	Seat-km	Passenger-km	Seat occupancy (%)	Train-km	Passenger car km	Punctuality (less than 5 mins)
2007	15,558,356	7,838,644,289	3,520,173,426	44.91	7,925,828	95,109,936	99.47%
2008	30,581,261	15,089,499,008	6,566,119,575	43.51	15,257,330	183,087,960	99.19%
2009	32,349,260	14,821,653,184	6,863,960,208	46.31	14,986,505	179,838,060	99.25%
2010	36,939,596	15,296,119,539	7,491,019,590	48.97	15,466,248	185,594,976	99.21%
2011	41,629,303	15,781,051,602	8,147,869,493	51.63	15,956,574	191,478,888	99.87%
2012	44,525,754	15,829,068,364	8,641,573,257	54.59	16,005,125	192,061,500	99.40%
2013	47,486,229	15,858,327,738	9,118,060,276	57.50	16,034,710	192,416,520	99.38%
2014	48,024,758	16,167,495,855	9,235,162,292	57.12	16,347,317	196,167,804	99.61%
2015	50,561,954	16,186,948,588	9,654,960,687	59.65	16,366,984	196,403,808	99.66%
2016	56,586,210	16,512,526,628	10,488,339,832	63.52	16,696,185	200,354,220	99.43%
2017	60,571,057	17,040,173,121	11,103,358,620	65.16	17,229,700	206,756,400	99.72%
2018	63,963,199	17,249,709,128	11,558,787,218	67.01	17,441,565	209,298,780	99.43%
2019	67,411,248	17,629,990,176	11,994,452,919	68.03	17,826,078	213,912,936	99.88%
2020	57,238,942	17,407,300,140	9,912,062,318	56.94	17,626,356	211,516,272	99.72%
2021	43,459,558	15,175,274,282	7,568,787,566	49.88	15,532,523	186,390,276	98.75%
2022	54,162,008	17,516,589,784	9,338,060,508	53.31	17,928,956	215,147,472	99.47%
2023	73,086,668	17,779,654,904	12,564,568,569	70.67	18,198,214	218,378,568	99.57%
2024	78,250,483						
2025	82,070,618						

View source data.
View source data.

The 10-millionth passenger was carried after 265 days of operation on 26 September 2007, while the 100-millionth passenger was carried after 1,307 days on 3 August 2010, and 200-millionth by December 2012. On 10 October 2011, the Double Ten Day holiday, THSRC transported a single-day record of 189,386 passengers. On 5 February 2011, the third day of Lunar New Year’s celebration, a new record of 190,596 passengers was achieved. The next single-day record was reached on 25 January 2012, also the third day of Lunar New Year's celebration, at 191,989 passengers. The most recent record is 212,000 passengers transported on 1 January 2013.

The high-speed trains have successfully out-competed planes: by August 2008, half of the air routes between Taipei and the country's western cities had been discontinued, including all connections between cities with THSR stations except for a single daily connection between Taipei and Kaohsiung. Total domestic air traffic was expected to be halved from 2006 to 2008, and actually fell from 8.6 to 4.9 million. In June 2012, officials announced the discontinuation of the last remaining commercial flight between Taipei and Kaohsiung. The share for conventional rail between Taipei and Kaohsiung fell from 9.71% in 2006 to 2.5% in 2008, while high-speed rail became the most common mode of transport at 50% of all trips by 2008. The opening of THSR led to a 10% reduction of traffic on the parallel expressway in 2007. Despite cheaper ticket prices, long-distance bus companies reported that passenger volumes had fallen by 20 to 30 percent by 2008.

== Infrastructure ==
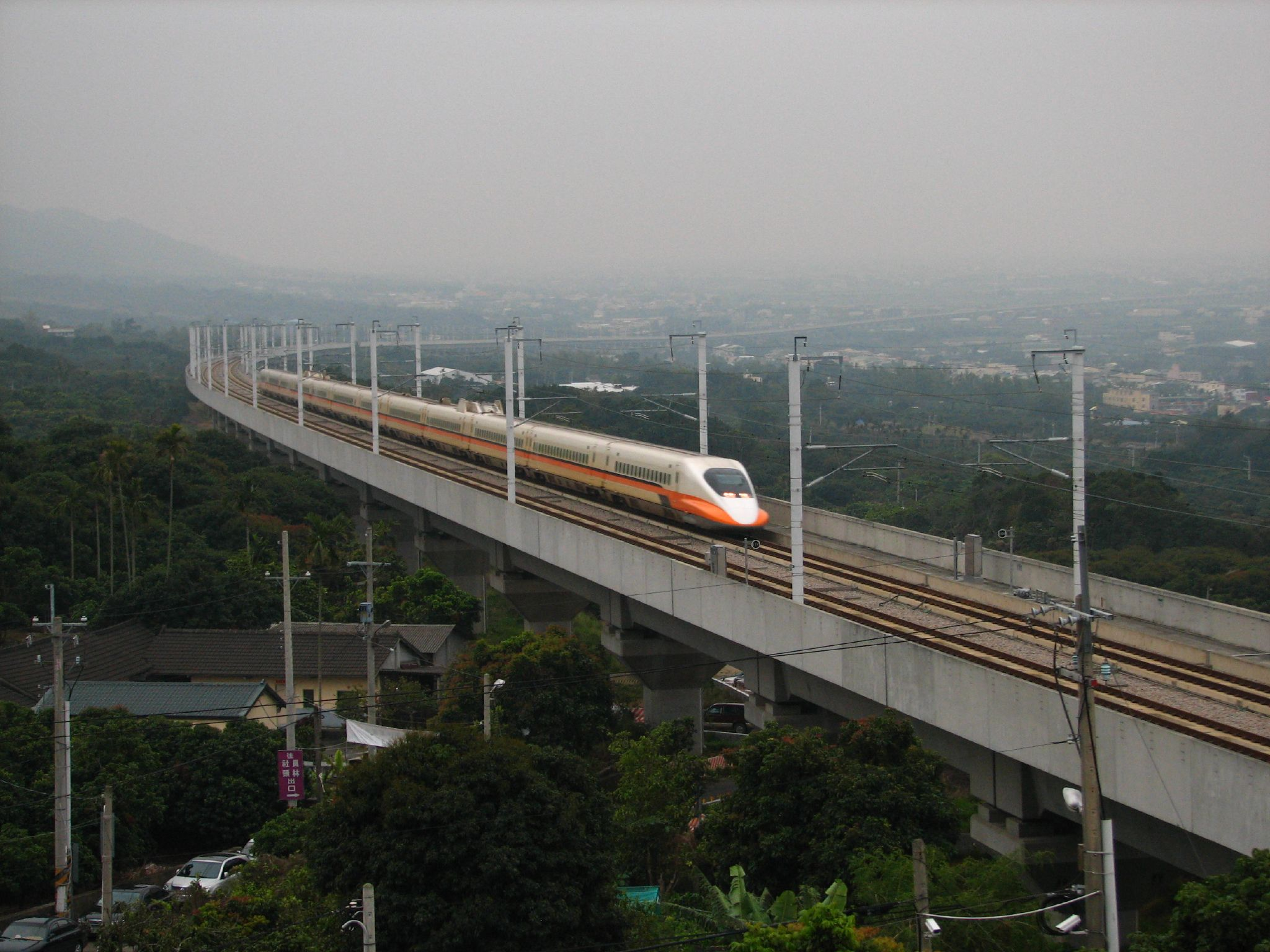
About 70 percent of the line is on viaducts. Track is almost entirely ballastless on concrete, with components that limit noise emission.

Construction of the system took more than 2,000 professional engineers from 20 countries and over 20,000 foreign and domestic workers six years to complete. Construction work was broken into several specialized lots that were contracted separately. One group of contracts was for civil works, covering the construction of the superstructure of open line sections. Stations and depots were the subject of separate groups of construction contracts. A fourth group of contracts was for track work.

The Taiwan North-South High Speed Rail Project was awarded the first prize for the Outstanding Civil Engineering Project Award by the Asian Civil Engineering Coordination Council (ACECC) in Sydney in 2010.

In 2011, the Public Construction Commission (公共工程委員會) organized an on-line voting campaign that garnered over 330,000 votes, to select the 100 best infrastructure projects (百大建設) in Taiwan to celebrate the centennial of the Republic; Taiwan High Speed Rail topped the list.

=== Track ===
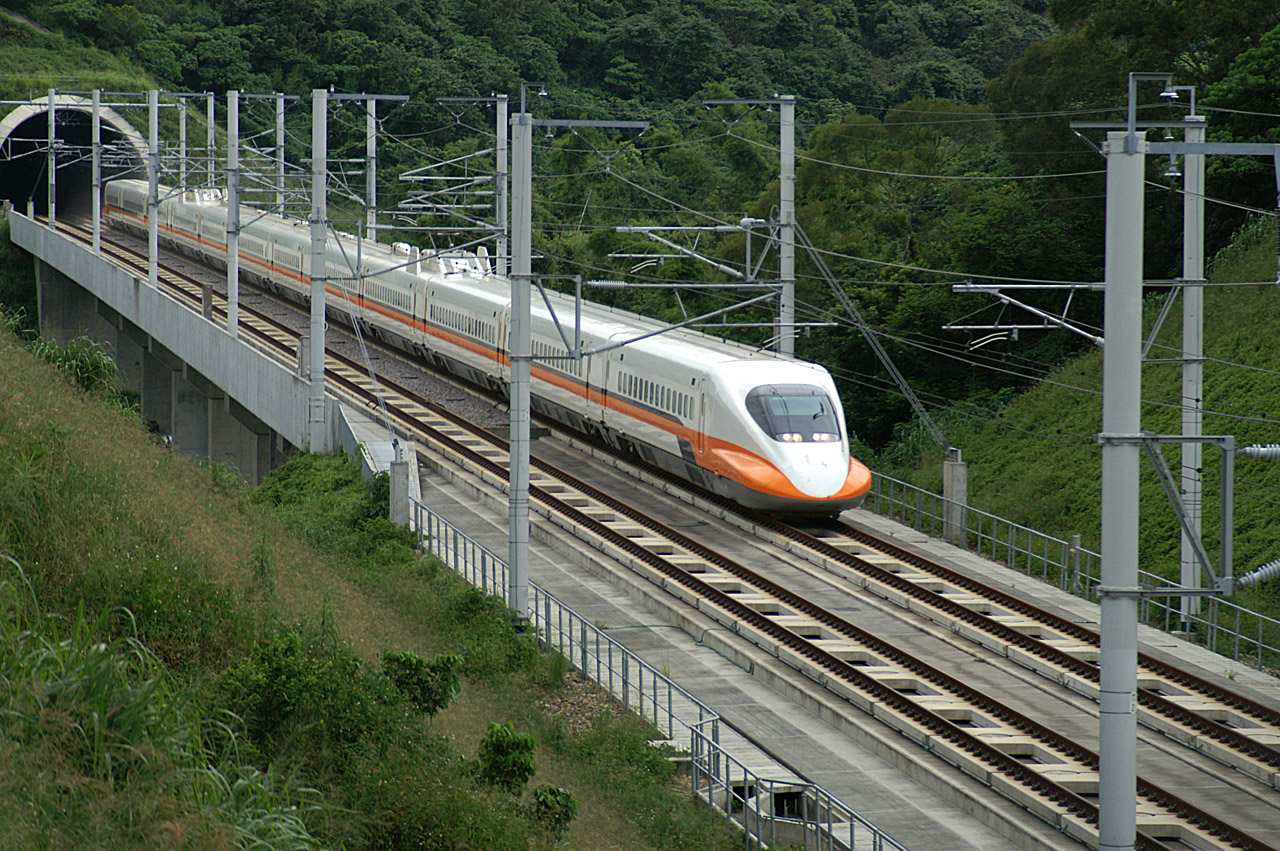
THSR train on a test run in June 2006. About 61 km (18 per cent of the route) is in tunnels; a large 90 m^{2} (970 sq ft) tunnel cross-section, as seen here, reduces sudden changes in air pressure experienced by passengers.

Reflecting a design speed of 350 km/h (217 mph), track layout was designed with a minimum curve radius of 6,250 m (20,505 ft), track-centre distance of 4,500 mm (177.2 in), right-of-way width of 18 m (59 ft 1 in), and a maximum gradient of 2.5%, except for 3.5% at one location. All but 3 km (1.9 mi) of track is ballastless, combining slab track of Japanese manufacture on open line sections with switches from a German supplier. Track laying began in July 2003. The line was electrified with the 25 kV/60 Hz AC system. The signalling and train control system was laid out for bi-directional operation according to European specifications. Each track section has a checkpoint, and an automatic control system ensures that trains are spaced at least 1 km (0.62 mi) apart to prevent collisions.

Most of the line is elevated. About 251 km (156 mi) or 73% of the line runs on viaducts, mostly precast pre-stressed concrete box girder spans, the first of which was put in place in October 2001.

The Changhua-Kaohsiung Viaduct is a 157,317 m (97.752 mi) continuous section from Baguashan (八卦山) in Changhua County to Zuoying in Kaohsiung. It was the second longest bridge in the world as of 2017. Viaducts were designed to be earthquake resistant to allow for trains to stop safely during a seismic event and for repairable damage following a maximum design earthquake. Bridges built over known fault lines were designed to survive fault movements without catastrophic damage.

About 61 km (38 mi) or 18% of the line is in tunnels, including 14 km (8.7 mi) of the TRUPO section in Taipei, as well as 48 tunnels with a total length of 46,257 m (28.743 mi) on the other sections, the longest of which is Paghuashan Tunnel, at a finished length of 7,364 m (24,160 ft). Forty-two of the tunnels included a total of 39,050 m (24.265 mi) of mined sections, all of which were bored with the sequential excavation and support construction method, with excavated tunnel faces of 135–155 m^{2} (1,450–1,670 sq ft), between November 2000 and July 2003. The finished interior cross-sectional area of 90 m^{2} (970 sq ft), set according to wider European standards, provides space for two tracks with safety walkways.

After four months of delays, trial runs using the first THSR 700T trains began on 27 January 2005, on the Tainan–Kaohsiung section. On 30 October 2005, a day after a test run passed the planned top service speed of 300 km/h (186 mph), the targeted maximum test speed of 315 km/h (196 mph) was achieved. The section between Banqiao (Taipei) and Zuoying (Kaohsiung) opened to the public on 5 January 2007. The HSR platforms at Taipei Station opened on 2 March 2007, bringing the entire line into operation.

=== Stations ===
A distinctive feature of the system's station placement is that many are located at the periphery of urban areas, rather than within city centers. The decision was made with the expectation that the stations would act as centers for planned communities and thus increase the property values of the surrounding area. A study in 2010 showed that this isn't the case, but later analyses show that property prices around certain stations have indeed risen. Since the THSR's opening, cities have gradually expanded their mass transit systems to connect with these stations.

=== Environmental issues ===
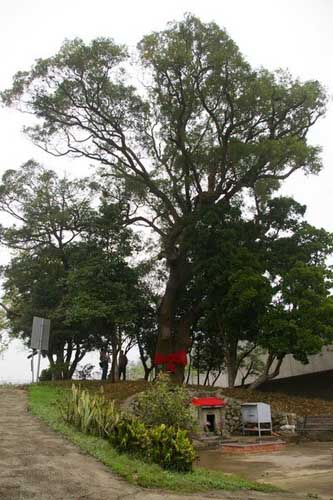
THSRC drafted the Hsinchu Old Camphor Tree Medical Plan, which called for the repair of decayed branches as well as measures designed to maintain the long-term growth and the health of the tree.

Environmental mitigation measures in the line's construction phase included the construction of animal bridges over the line, the planting and re-planting of trees along the track as noise screens, and the purchase of farmland to create a preservation area for jacana birds away from the line.

THSRC is involved in the preservation of the pheasant-tailed jacana, which is considered endangered in Taiwan. An artificial habitat recovery project was completed in collaboration with the local government, country development organizations and non-profit organizations for a cost of NT$50 million. In 2007, the recovery habitat was officially renamed the "Pheasant-tailed Jacana Eco-Educational Nature Park" and since then, it has opened to the public. THSRC arranges for elementary and junior high school students to visit the park annually.

A 330 year old camphor tree and a temple in Hsinchu County are located on the main route of the THSR, and both of them faced removal because of railway construction. The temple established beside the old tree serves as a major religious site for the local community. In 1998, THSRC adjusted the line and design to keep the tree and temple in their original place and cooperated with the local government and people to protect the old tree and the temple until today. Afterwards, together with the local government, the Environment and the Resources Protection Committee, and cultural and historical authorities, THSRC drafted the Hsinchu Old Camphor Tree Medical Plan, which called for the repair of decayed branches as well as measures designed to maintain the long-term growth and the health of the tree.

== Financial ==
=== Revenue and cost ===
Revenue and cost of Taiwan High Speed Rail
Item	2007	2008	2009	2010	2011	2012	2013	2014	2015	2016	2017	2018
Ticket revenue (A)	13,155,221	22,441,012	22,800,753	27,025,822	31,556,782	33,263,223					42,221,888	44,098,796
Other operating revenue (B)	347,567	606,571	522,959	609,529	679,723	720,914						
Operating revenue (C=A+B)	13,502,788	23,047,583	23,323,712	27,635,351	32,236,505	33,984,137	36,101,166	38,510,000	51,901,392	40,610,906	43,435,042	45,415,007
Depreciation	−18,589,587	−18,994,251	−8,222,634	−9,411,998	−10,647,252	−11,206,236						
Operating income	−14,909,057	−6,238,553	5,564,846	9,071,545	12,058,405	12,095,229	11,394,464	11,880,000	20,556,496	13,699,496	17,754,984	19,144,964
Financial revenue	315,187	644,500	639,869	230,348	248,318	633,040						
Interest	−14,423,091	−17,464,896	−10,778,335	−8,912,483	−8,854,892	−8,737,156			−9,256,852	−8,375,559	−7,463,329	−6,618,272
Net pre-tax income	−29,398,694	−25,009,697	−4,791,125	-1,210,889	5,783,743	3,956,828	2,710,000	2,660,000	18,833,835	4,997,575	6,478,500	7,311,823
Tax/tax refund	−54	0	1,670	848	−2,597,914	−379,992	−579,439		2,038,795	−848,477	−1,138,595	3,384,558
Net income	−29,398,748	−25,009,697	−4,789,455	−1,210,041	3,185,833	3,576,836	3,288,951	5,520,000	20,872,630	4,149,098	5,339,905	10,696,381
All figures are in thousands of NT$.

Most of THSRC's revenue comes from ticket sales; supplemental income comes from other activities such as advertising and renting spaces for standing shops and spots in plazas. Advertising spots on trains and station platforms have also been sold. Revenues grew along with ridership over the first three years, but ridership remained below expectations. In 2008 the second year of operation, revenues fell barely short of THSRC's expectations a year earlier of a doubling of first-year results.

The cost of running the trains and infrastructure, or cash operating costs, was initially over NT$1 billion a month, but was reduced to around NT$850–900 million in 2008. Revenues first exceeded this level, thus generating a positive operating cash flow, in the fourth month of operation (April 2007).

For THSRC, the over heavy accounting of the fixed cost of fixed assets like rolling stock and infrastructure (depreciation) is a significant non-cash element of total operating costs. In its first two years of operation, THSRC applied straight-line depreciation, distributing costs evenly over a period of 26.5 years. As a result, the balance of operating revenues and costs (operating income) showed a high loss in the first year of operation, which was only reduced as revenues grew in the second year. The depreciation period set for THSRC reflected the length of the B.O.T. concession rather than the much longer lifespan of the infrastructure, and it is the factor for the operating loss. After adopting an activity depreciation method which is variable in time, THSRC posted its first operating profit for 2009, the third year of operation. The company reported its first annual profit of NT$5.78 billion after five years of operation.

For the first time in its five-year operation, the Company reported a net income of NT$5.78 billion, with earnings per share of NT$0.59. Revenues increased by 16.65% from NT$27.64 billion to NT$32.24 billion, with operating costs and expenses (excluding depreciation and amortization) rising by only 4.98%. Over the same period, gross profit totaled NT$12.98 billion (an increase of 30.32%), income from operations totaled NT$12.06 billion (an increase of 32.93%) and EBITDA totaled NT$22.73 billion (an increase of 22.34%). 2011 gross profit, income from operation and EBITDA were all record highs. Since commencing operations in 2007, THSRC has had a significant influence on Taiwan's economy and on the lives of its people. In 2011, the Company continued to pursue sustainable growth aligned with the interests of shareholders and society, achieving record profits even amid a challenging economic environment.

The interest cost is another major item of this company's financing. In the first few years of operation, interest rates were well above market rates. Interest expense per month stood at around NT$1.3 billion in 2008, when THSRC first achieved break-even cash flow, with revenue and cash expenses (which exclude depreciation) both around NT$2.1 billion in 2008. Interest rates fell in the first half of 2009, reducing interest expenses and contributing to a reduced net loss.

In 2010, THSRC obtained a new syndicate loan to alleviate its imminent financial burden. The company signed a NT$382 billion refinancing contract with a consortium of eight domestic banks led by the Bank of Taiwan, and used the new loan to pay off the previous syndicated loan, which had higher interest. As of 2011, the long-term debts totalling NT$385 billion included NT$26 billion in corporate bonds and NT$359 billion in bank loans. In comparison with the terms and conditions of previous loans, the refinancing debts carried lower interest rates and longer tenors, up to 22 years.

=== Financial and loan ===
In cumulative figures, until July 2008, depreciation and interest were equal to 95% of THSRC's accumulated debt. Both THSRC and a September 2009 government report identified an unreasonable financial structure and the resulting high interest rates and high depreciation charges as the main causes of negative financial performance, while the government assessed THSRC to have performed well in its core business, as measured by earnings before interest, taxes, depreciation and amortization (EBITDA). To reduce its interest load, THSRC sought to revise its loan structure in 2008 and again in 2009. To reduce depreciation costs by increasing the amortization time, THSRC requested an extension of its 35-year concession period.

By the summer of 2009, THSRC's cumulative losses were equivalent to two-thirds of its equity capital. In response to the 2008 financial crisis and the Great Recession, THSRC proposed to increase income and reduce expenditures in several aspects in the hope of raising operation performances. In February 2009, THSRC announced to adjust train frequency, cut down salary payment by 10~20% among management level, and measured to expand fare promotion to stimulate ridership. While the media questioned whether the planned construction of three more intermediate stations and the extension to Nangang would be postponed, THSRC published press release on 28 September 2009, stating that the company will comply with "Taiwan High Speed. Rail Construction and Operation Contract", and the construction project of three intermediate stations, namely Miaoli, Changhua and Yunlin will be initiated in July 2012, and was scheduled to start its operation from 2015. By the time of completion, there will be a total of 12 stations along the THSRC operation route. The company was put under new management in September 2009 with the aim of turning around the company's finances with government help in arranging refinancing of the loans.

The government took majority control of the company after the election of its new board on 10 November 2009. In January 2010, when accumulated losses already exceeded NT$70 billion, THSRC signed a government-guaranteed refinancing deal in which eight government-dominated banks provided NT$382 billion at lower interest rates and longer maturity. The government also approved the company's new variable depreciation charge.

== Incidents ==
On 12 April 2013, suspicious luggage items were found inside a toilet of northbound train No. 616 as it was heading towards THSR Hsinchu Station. The train was stopped at THSR Taoyuan Station and all passengers were evacuated. Later, it was determined the luggage contained an unidentified liquid in cans, alarm clock and white particulate matter. The items were dismantled by a bomb squad and taken for further investigation. Two KMT legislators, Hsu Hsin-ying and Lu Shiow-yen, were on board.

On 10 May 2017, a non-passenger carrying train traveled in the opposite direction of the track from Zuoying to Tainan for 1 km (0.62 mi) due to negligence.

Due to the COVID-19 pandemic, THSR, along with the Taiwan Railway Administration and bus services nationwide, began to require all passengers to wear surgical masks as of 1 April 2020. In addition, infrared sensors were set up at twelve stations to detect fevers, eating and drinking were prohibited on board the trains, and trains and stations were disinfected more frequently. THSR also cancelled non-reserved seating tickets, which had allowed passengers to stand if no seats were available. It was reported that the switch to reserved seats only aimed to reduce crowding.

== Public relations activities ==
Since 2009, the company has organized an annual "Ride THSR and Join the Book Exhibition for Free" event to promote a national reading culture; school-age passengers from remote villages are given free admission to the Taipei International Book Exhibition and go there on a themed high-speed "reading train", which features a celebrity reading a book over the train's public address system.

Since 2010, along with World Vision Taiwan, THSRC has run a tuition fee assistance program for thousands of underprivileged children, to which passengers contribute.

Other events have been a cappella singers at stations; gift-giving to couples taking wedding photos at major stations; station tours for the public and experience-sharing with its fellow railway transportation operators; and in collaboration with non-profit organizations, thousands of free rides to underprivileged groups and families.

Students at primary, secondary and tertiary level learn about high-speed rail and THSRC at "THSR Camps", held in partnership with the Railway Cultural Society of Taiwan, the National Chiao Tung University Railway Research Society, and the China Youth Corps.

== In popular culture ==
- The first film to feature THSR prominently was the 2007 Taiwanese movie Summer's Tail, directed by Cheng Wen-tang (鄭文堂).
- Railfan: Taiwan High Speed Rail, a 2007 train simulator video game developed jointly by Taiwanese company Actainment and Japanese company Ongakukan on the basis of the latter's Train Simulator series, featured real video and was the first Taiwanese game for Sony Computer Entertainment's PlayStation 3 system.
- The National Geographic website chose travel by Taiwan's high speed train as the "Best winter trip” in 2013.
- 96 Minutes, a 2025 Taiwanese disaster action thriller film directed by Hung Tzu-hsuan centered on the Taiwan High Speed Rail system.

== See also ==
- Rail transport in Taiwan
- Transportation in Taiwan
