= Tianzhong railway station =

Railway station in Changhua, Taiwan

Tianzhong 田中車站
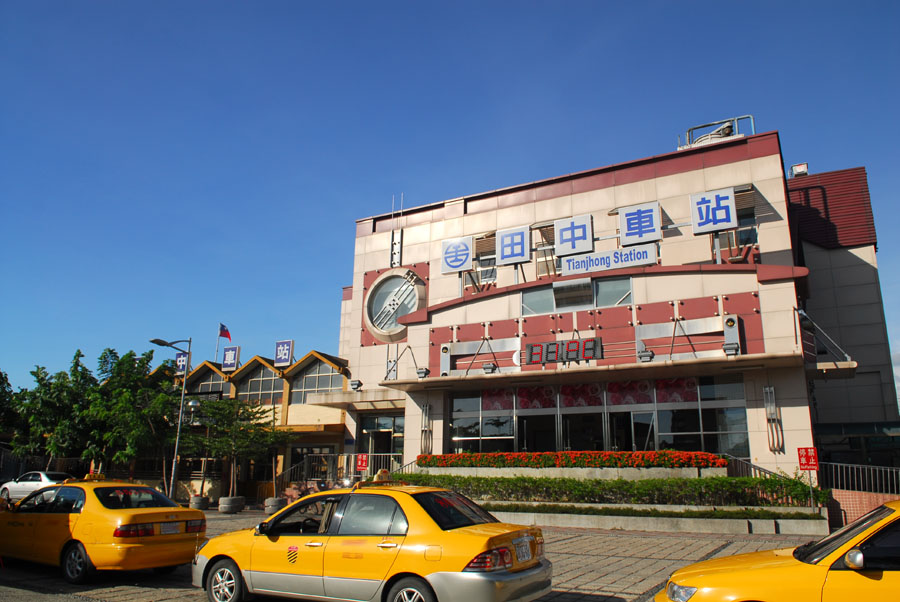

General information
- Location: Tianzhong, Changhua County, Taiwan
- Coordinates: 23°51′30.7″N 120°35′27.8″E
- System: Railway station
- Owner: Taiwan Railway
- Operator: Taiwan Railway
- Line: Western Trunk line
- Train operators: Taiwan Railway

History
- Opened: 26 March 1905

Passengers
- 4,837 daily (2024)

Services
Preceding station	Taiwan Railway	Following station
Shetou towards Keelung	Western Trunk line	Ershui towards Kaohsiung
Location

Tianzhong (Chinese: 田中車站; Hanyu Pinyin: Tiánzhōng Chēzhàn; Tongyong Pinyin: Tiánjhong Chejhàn) is a railway station on Taiwan Railway West Coast line located in Tianzhong Township, Changhua County, Taiwan.

== History ==
The station was opened on 26 March 1905.

== Service ==
The station is currently served by Tze-Chiang Limited Express, Chu-Kuang Express, Local Express, and Local Trains operated by Taiwan Railway Corporation.

== Around the station ==
- THSR Changhua Station

== See also ==
- List of railway stations in Taiwan
