= THSR 700T =

High speed train type operated in Taiwan

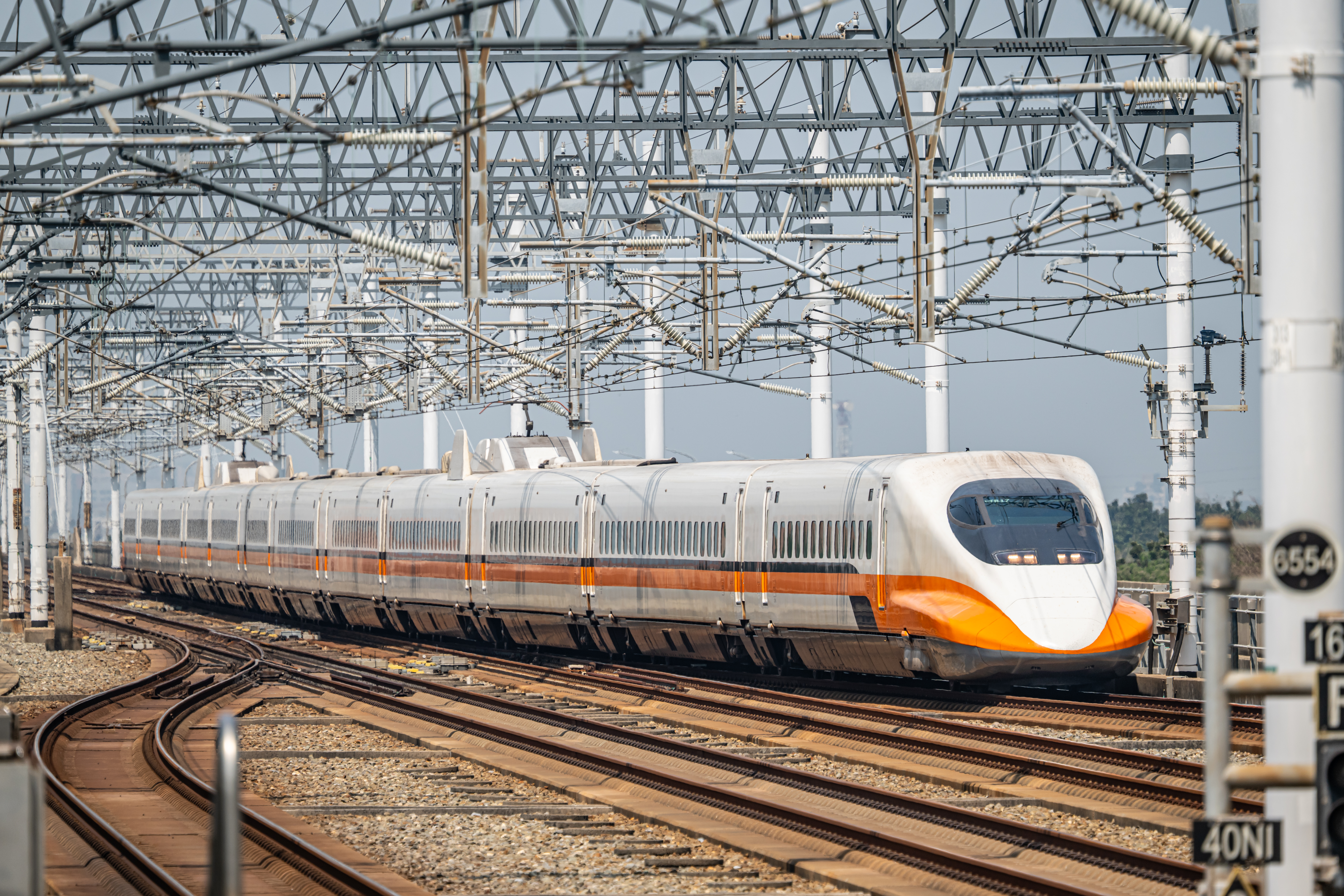
- A 700T train approaching Tainan HSR station in March 2025

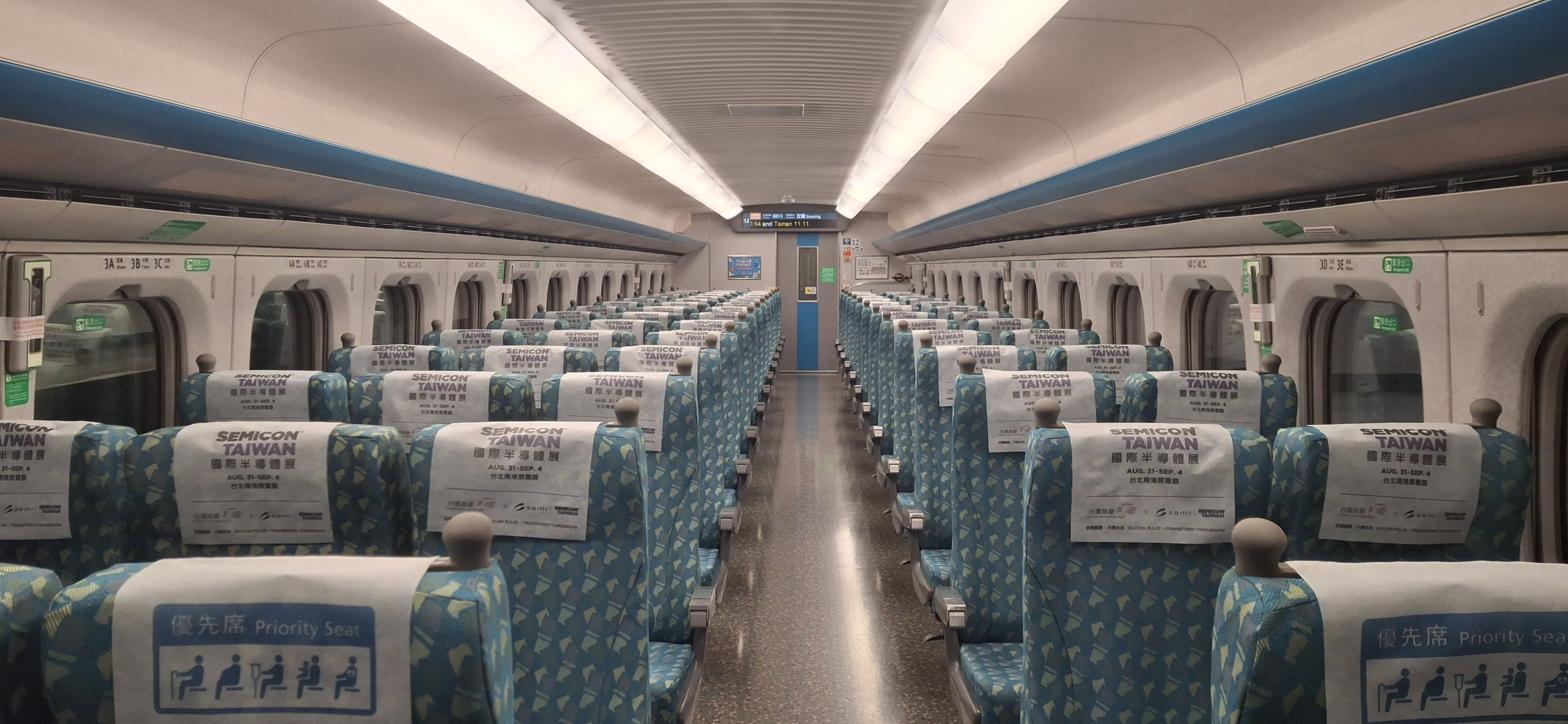
- train interior
- Stock type: Electric multiple unit
- Manufacturers: Kawasaki Heavy Industries, Hitachi Rail, Nippon Sharyo
- Family name: Shinkansen (700 Series)
- Constructed: 2004–2006, 2012–2015
- Entered service: January 5, 2007; 19 years ago
- Number built: 408 vehicles (34 sets)
- Number in service: 408 vehicles (34 sets)
- Formation: 12 cars per trainset Tc-M2-MP-M1-T-M1s-MP-M2-M1-MP-M2-Tc Cars 4 and 9 are equipped with a pantograph: Tc: driving trailer (end car without motor); T: trailer (intermediate car without motor); M: motor car
- Fleet numbers: TR01–TR34
- Capacity: 977: Business Car (1): 66 seats (2+2, pitch: 1.12 m (44.1 in)); Standard Car (11): 911 seats (2+3, pitch: 1.04 m (40.9 in)) + 4 wheelchair accessible seats
- Operator: Taiwan High Speed Rail
- Depots: Wuri, Zuoying
- Line served: Nangang-Zuoying

Specifications
- Car body construction: Aluminium
- Train length: 304 m (997 ft 5 in)
- Car length: End cars: 27.0 m (88 ft 7 in); Car body: 26.75 m (87 ft 9 1/8 in); Intermediate cars: 25.0 m (82 ft 1/4 in); Car body: 24.5 m (80 ft 4 9/16 in); (Transitions: 50 cm (19 11/16 in))
- Width: 3.38 m (11 ft 1 1/16 in)
- Height: 3.65 m (11 ft 11 11/16 in) (without rooftop equipment)
- Floor height: 1.25 m (49 in)
- Platform height: 1.25 m (49 in)
- Wheel diameter: 860 mm (33.9 in)
- Wheelbase: 2.5 m (98.4 in)
- Maximum speed: Service: 300 km/h (190 mph); Record: 315 km/h (195 mph)
- Weight: 503 t (495 long tons; 554 short tons)
- Axle load: max. 14 t (14 long tons; 15 short tons)
- Traction system: Toshiba or Mitsubishi Electric IGBT–C/I
- Traction motors: 36 × Toshiba 285 kW (382 hp) 3-phase AC induction motor
- Power output: 10.26 MW (13,760 hp)
- Acceleration: 2.0 km/(h⋅s) (0.56 m/s^{2})
- Deceleration: Service braking: 0.34 m/s^{2} (1.2 km/(h⋅s)) (300 km/h or 190 mph) to 0.75 m/s^{2} (2.7 km/(h⋅s)) (below 70 km/h or 43 mph); Emergency braking: 1 m/s^{2} (3.6 km/(h⋅s)) 300 to 0 km/h (186 to 0 mph) in 3.78 km (2.35 mi)
- Electric system: 25 kV 60 Hz AC (nominal) from overhead catenary
- Current collection: T-shaped pantograph
- UIC classification: 2′2′+Bo′Bo′+Bo′Bo′+Bo′Bo′+2′2′+Bo′Bo′+Bo′Bo′+Bo′Bo′+Bo′Bo′+Bo′Bo′+Bo′Bo′+2′2′
- Bogies: bolsterless
- Braking systems: power cars: regenerative trailers: eddy current
- Safety system: D-ATC
- Track gauge: 1,435 mm (4 ft 8 1/2 in) standard gauge

The THSR 700T (Chinese: 台灣高鐵700T型電聯車) is a high-speed electric multiple unit trainset derived from the Japanese Shinkansen for Taiwan High Speed Rail (THSR). The THSR 700T is based primarily on the 700 Series EMU that currently operates on the San'yō Shinkansen line and previously on the Tokaido Shinkansen line in Japan, with the "T" referring to Taiwan. The trains were manufactured in Japan by Kawasaki Heavy Industries, Nippon Sharyo, and Hitachi, Ltd., marking the first time Japanese Shinkansen trains have been exported overseas. Thirty-four trains were delivered to THSR operator Taiwan High Speed Rail Corporation (THSRC), and are in regular service with a top speed of 300 kilometres per hour (186 mph) since the line's opening on January 5, 2007.

== History ==
Taiwan's Bureau of High Speed Rail (BOHSR) started to tender THSR as a build-operate-transfer (BOT) scheme in October 1996. The two competitors were the Taiwan High Speed Rail Consortium (THSRC) and the Chunghwa High Speed Rail Consortium (CHSRC). THSRC's bid was based on the high-speed technology platform called Eurotrain, which was a joint venture of GEC-Alsthom and Siemens, the respective manufacturers of the French TGV and German ICE, while CHSRC's bid was based on Japanese Shinkansen technology supplied by Taiwan Shinkansen Consortium (TSC), a joint venture of Japanese companies. THSRC was named preferred bidder in September 1997, then, after being reconstituted as the Taiwan High Speed Rail Corporation (THSRC), it signed the BOT agreement with BOHSR on July 23, 1998. Following an offer from the Japanese government to provide cheap loans to THSRC if it switches to Shinkansen technology, in spite of an earlier agreement with Eurotrain, THSRC decided to re-tender the core systems technology contract June 1999. THSRC announced on December 28, 1999, that it would negotiate a final contract with TSC. The contract, which included the supply of rolling stock, was signed on December 12, 2000. The controversial award was challenged by Eurotrain in courts without success, but a later lawsuit for payment of damages was successful.

While TSC's original offer in CHSRC's 1997 bid for the BOT franchise was based on the 500 Series Shinkansen, its bid for THSRC's 1999 tender was based on the newer 700 Series Shinkansen. THSRC maintained its European specifications, so the trains had to be designed for and commissioned according to European specifications.

On January 30, 2004, a roll-out ceremony was conducted at Kawasaki Heavy Industries' Hyogo Works. The first train was shipped to Taiwan in May 2004. Running tests started on the THSR high speed line on January 27, 2005, after four months of delays, on the Tainan–Kaohsiung section. During the tests, a national speed record of 315 km/h (196 mph) was achieved on October 30, 2005. All 30 trains were delivered to Taiwan by 2006. Commercial operation of the 700T began on January 5, 2007, at a maximum operating speed of 300 km/h (186 mph).

In November 2008 THSRC announced that it was considering ordering an additional six to twelve trains from the Japanese makers for service starting in 2011, in order to cope with increased demand that was expected by that time. In May 2012, an order was placed with Kawasaki Heavy Industries (structural and mechanical parts) and Toshiba (electrical and electromechanical parts) for four 12 car trains at an estimated cost of 19 billion Japanese yen. The trains were delivered between December 2012 and 2015, with options for extra sets.

== Technical details ==
The THSR 700T series is based on the 700 Series Shinkansen operated by JR Central and JR West on the Tōkaidō Shinkansen and San'yō Shinkansen in Japan. However, more powerful motors and eddy current brakes on trailers provide for a higher top speed. Also for 300 km/h (186 mph) operation, a number of features were derived from the 500 Series Shinkansen, such as the bogies, and the T-shaped and aerodynamically optimised pantographs for reduced noise emission atop cars 4 and 9. The D-ATC (Digital Automatic Train Control) system was in turn derived from that of the 800 Series Shinkansen. Like the 700 Series Shinkansen, a 700T trainset is made of 4-car sub-sets, each with three motor cars and one trailer, albeit a full train is a 12-car set rather than a 16-car or 8-car set.

Due to the European safety requirements adapted by THSRC, the trains were equipped with a number of additional safety features compared to Shinkansen trains in Japan. The ATC system was augmented with cruise control and station stopping control and was also made suitable for bi-directional operation, and there is a driver vigilance device. Bogies were fitted with an instability detection system, and pantographs with a system that automatically lowers the rear pantograph if it detects a failure of the leading pantograph. The trains were built with shock absorbing elements for protection in low-speed collisions and were equipped with a parking brake. For enhanced fire safety, fireproof and smokeproof materials were selected for the interior, which was configured with fire barriers, and the trains were equipped with fire and smoke detectors and a battery supplied emergency ventilation system. Passenger doors can be operated from any car, not just from the driver's cab, and are equipped with an obstacle detection system that can abort the closing of the door. The train is equipped with emergency escape windows, which can be broken with hammers for use as emergency exits. The pantograph can be operated by remote control.

Additional changes were made to the HVAC systems to account for Taiwan's warmer climates, such as higher strength and wear specifications of certain components, and a more powerful air conditioning system. As with other Shinkansen types, both end cars are trailers and braking power is reduced on the end cars, to avoid slip on powered bogies.

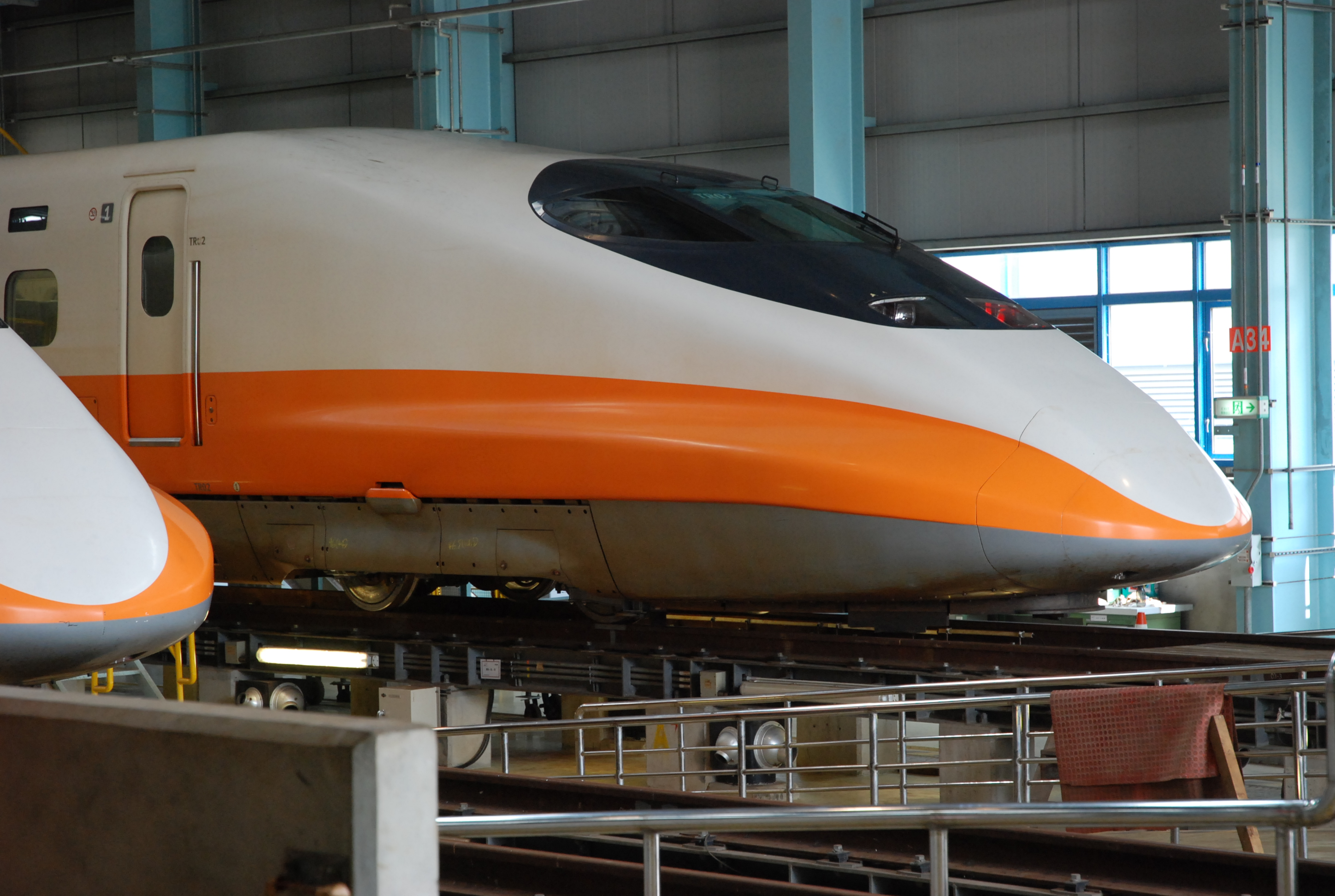
Nose of a THSR 700T end car

Rather than using Japanese tunnel specifications, THSR tunnels used European specifications, with diameters larger than those in Japan. The nose of the trains was aerodynamically optimised for the different tunnel cross-section, which allowed for a shorter, 8 m (26 ft 3 in) long nose. The shorter nose, and the lack of a sliding window and an extra door for the driver provided for more space for passengers.

All cars feature single passenger rooms with 2+3 or 2+2 seating, as on the 700 Series Shinkansen. Toilets were installed on odd numbered cars. One end of car 7 features four wheelchair accessible seats, also provide for the fastening of wheelchairs, and there are two foldable wheelchairs. The toilet next to the handicapped area was built to be accessible by wheelchair, with automatic sliding doors, wider space to allow a wheelchair to turn around, and handrails. The train has no restaurant or bar, but was equipped with vending machines, while Business Car passengers also get seat service. Certain cars were equipped with on-board telephones, in anticipation of the construction of a base system.

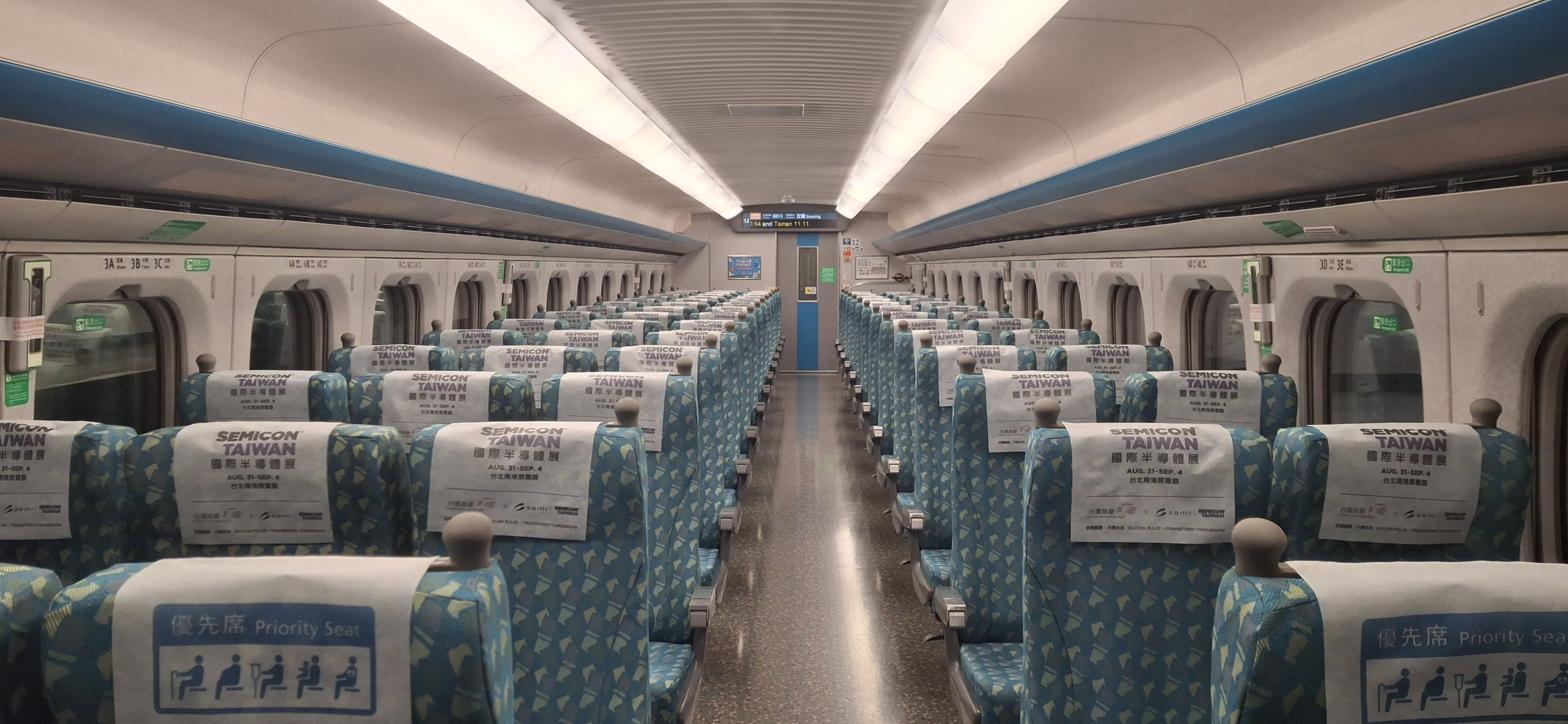
Standard Car interior

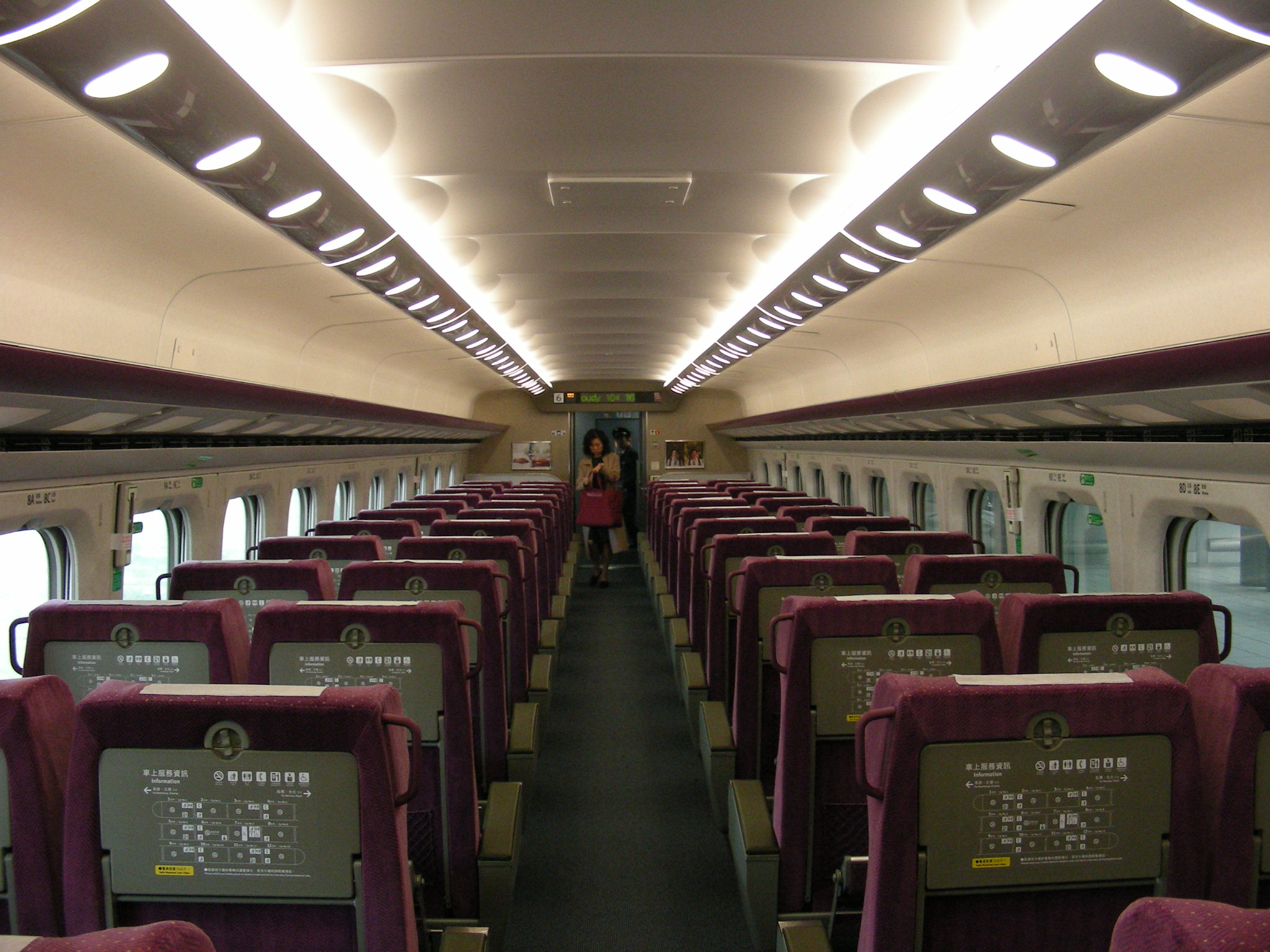
Business Car interior

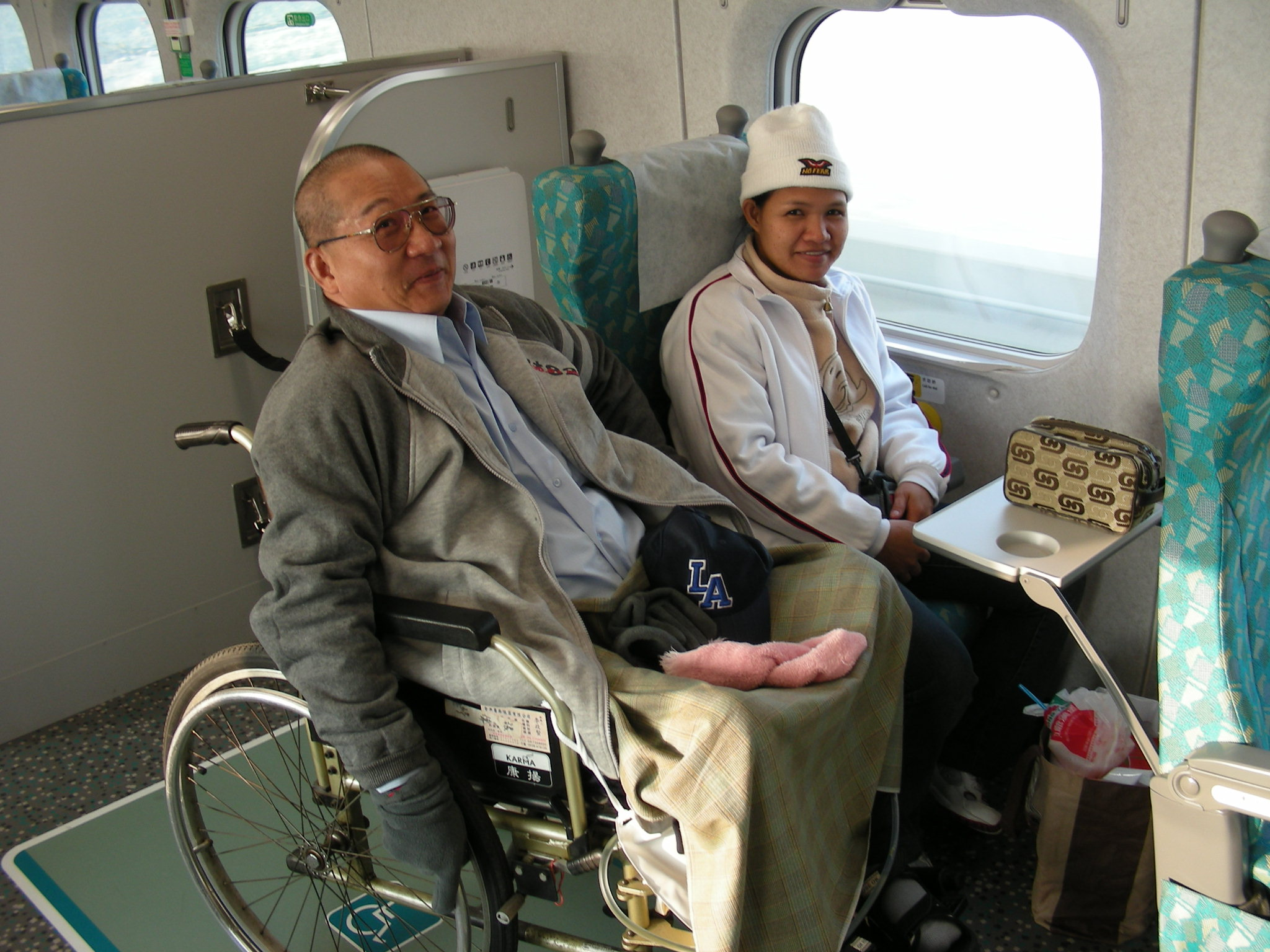
Handicapped seating

The per capita energy consumption of a fully loaded 700T train is 16% of private cars and half of buses. Carbon dioxide emissions are 11% and a fourth, respectively.

== Operation ==
As of May 2025, the THSR 700T trains ran without a serious accident. During the 2010 Kaohsiung earthquake on March 4, 2010, the wheels of one bogie of a train came off the rails during emergency braking, but there were no injuries and the train arrived at the next station after one hour of repairs.

In November 2010, following complaints when waiting lines formed at the toilets, THSRC changed the gender assignment of the toilets in the 700T trains. In the original configuration, in each car with toilets, there was a men's toilet with urinal and two unisex toilets; one of the latter was reassigned as a women's toilet.

== Formation ==
Each trainset is formed of 12 cars; they are formed as below:

Car no.	1	2	3	4	5	6	7	8	9	10	11	12
Designation	Tc	M2	MP	M1	T	M1s	MP	M2	M1	MP	M2	Tc
Numbering	100-01 300-01	100-02 300-02	100-03 300-03	100-04 300-04	100-05 300-05	100-06 300-06	100-07 300-07	100-08 300-08	100-09 300-09	100-10 300-10	100-11 300-11	100-12 300-12
Seating capacity	63	96	88	96	83	66	91	96	88	96	88	68
Facilities	Restroom, vending machine, 1 luggage space	2 luggage spaces	Restroom, 4 luggage spaces	Charging service, 2 luggage spaces	Restroom, breastfeeding room, vending machine, 4 luggage spaces	(Business Class) AED, conductor room, 3 luggage spaces	(Accessibility Car) Accessible restroom, 3 luggage spaces	2 luggage spaces	Restroom, 4 luggage spaces	2 luggage spaces	Restroom, vending machine, 4 luggage spaces	Charging service, 1 luggage space

Car 1 is on the Zuoying (south) side and Car 12 is on the Nangang (north) side.

Cars 4 and 9 are equipped with a single-arm pantograph.

Sets 1-30 have vehicle designations of 100-00.

Sets 31-34 have vehicle designations of 300-00.

== Train simulator ==
A THSR 700T train simulator, known as Railfan: Taiwan High Speed Rail, was developed jointly by Taiwan-based company Actainment and Japanese company Ongakukan in 2007, based on the latter's Train Simulator series. The software was released on the PlayStation 3 system in Asia (Hong Kong, Taiwan, & Singapore) on July 12, 2007, and in Japan on November 1, 2007.

== See also ==
- List of high speed trains
