= Changhua Plain =

Plain in Taiwan

Changhua Plain 彰化平原
- Alluvial plain
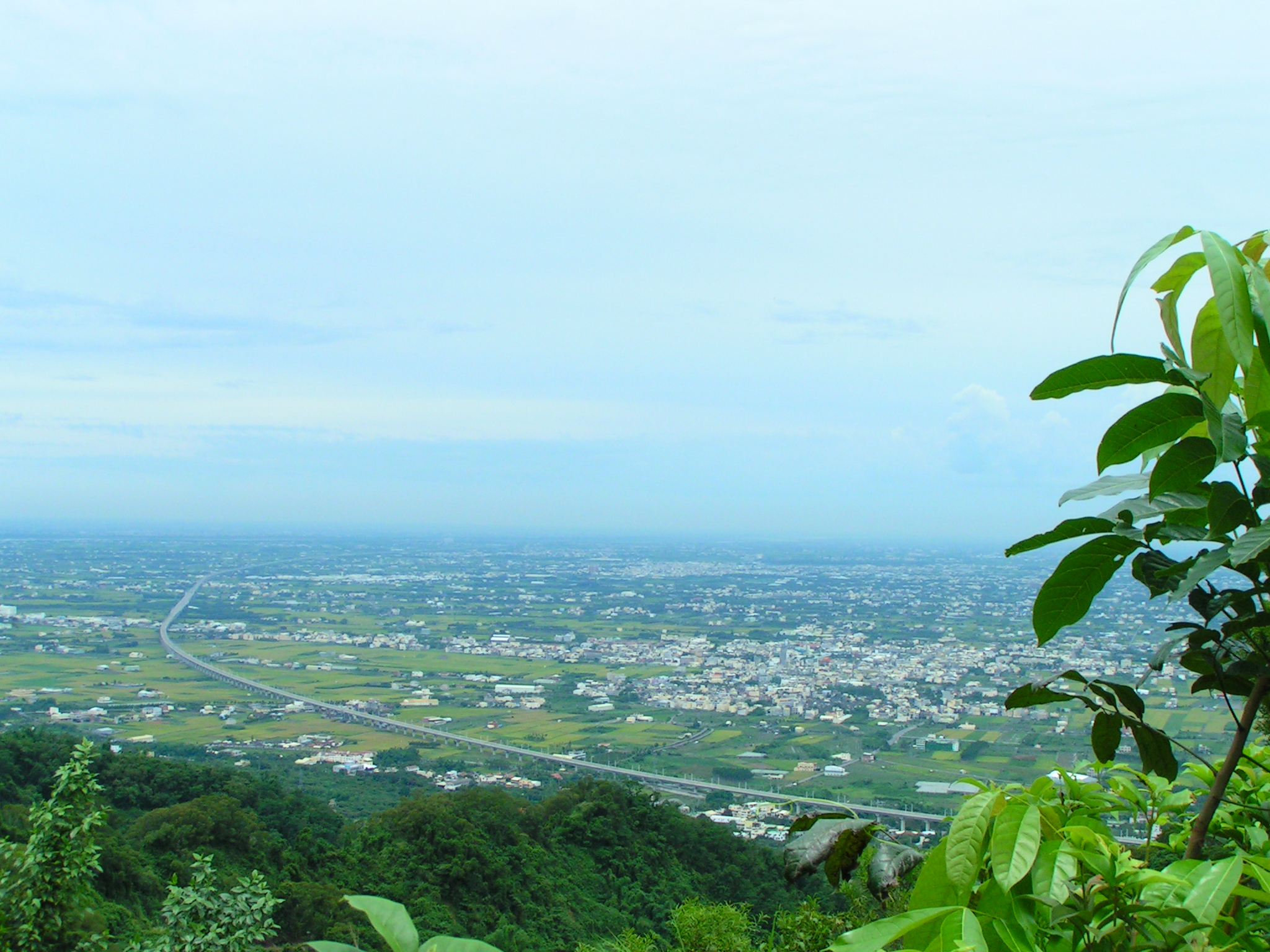

- Location within Taiwan
- Coordinates: 24.064932°N 120.460999°E
- Location: Taiwan
- Geology: Alluvial plain

Dimensions
  - Length: 40 km (25 mi)
  - Width: 15 km (9.3 mi)
- Elevation: 45 m (148 ft)

Changhua Plain (Chinese: 彰化平原; pinyin: Zhānghuà Píngyuán), which is sometimes listed as "Changhua Coastal Plain", is an alluvial plain in central Taiwan on the west coast between the Old Zhuoshui River (舊濁水溪) and Dadu River, and bordered to the east by the Bagua Plateau.

It occupied the northern parts of Changhua County, with a length of about 40 km (25 mi) and a width varying between 12 and 15 km (7.5 and 9.3 mi). While the area is mostly flat, the altitude ranges from about 12 to 45 meters (39 to 148 feet) above sea level.

Except for Bagua Plateau, Changhua County is divided into two plains: Changhua Plain and the Zhuoshui River Alluvial Fan (濁水溪沖積扇), separated by the Old Zhuoshui River.
