= Yunlin HSR station =

Railway station in Yunlin, Taiwan

Yunlin 雲林
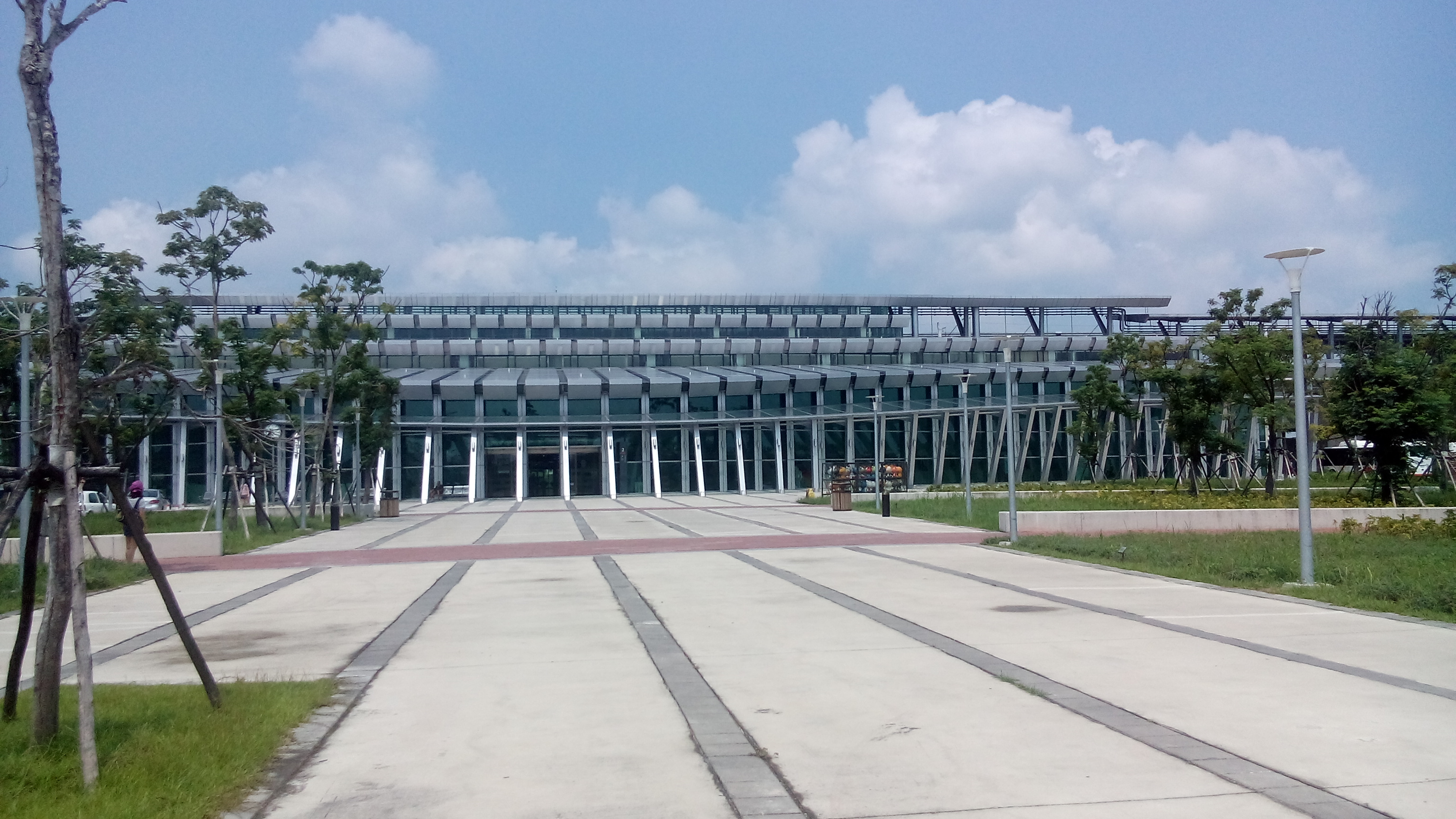

Chinese name
- Traditional Chinese: 雲林
Transcriptions
Standard Mandarin
- Hanyu Pinyin: Yúnlín
- Bopomofo: ㄩㄣˊ ㄌㄧㄣˊ
Hakka
- Romanization: Iǔn-lǐm (Sixian dialect); Rhun-lim (Hailu dialect)
Southern Min
- Tâi-lô: Hûn-lîm

General information
- Location: 301 Zhanqian E Rd; Huwei, Yunlin County; Taiwan
- Coordinates: 23.7363°N 120.4166°E
- System: THSR railway station
- Line: THSR
- Distance: 218.3 km
- Connections: Coach

Construction
- Structure type: Elevated
- Architect: Kris Yao

Other information
- Station code: YUL／09
- Website: www.thsrc.com.tw/en/StationInfo/Prospect/1d28ffa7-8f78-4c8b-b68d-ebef49dab774

History
- Opened: 2015-12-01

Passengers
- 2018: 2.572 million per year ▲2.49%
- Rank: 10 out of 12

Services
Preceding station	Taiwan High Speed Rail	Following station
Changhua towards Nangang	THSR	Chiayi towards Zuoying
Location
- Location within Taiwan

Yunlin (Chinese: 雲林; pinyin: Yúnlín) is a high speed rail station in Huwei Township, Yunlin County, Taiwan served by Taiwan High Speed Rail.

== History ==
- 05 January 2007: The segment from Banqiao to Zuoying opened for service, but not including Yunlin station.
- 01 December 2015: Yunlin station, along with Changhua and Miaoli stations, opened for service.

== Overview ==
The elevated station has two side platforms. It was opened on 1 December 2015. In March 2011, three planned roads to serve the station were cancelled due to land subsidence in the area, possibly due to overpumping of underground water.

== HSR services ==
The station is mostly served by 8xx trains which stop at all stations on the Taiwan High Speed Rail. In addition, Southbound Service 583, which departs from Taichung, and Northbound Service 598, which terminates at Taichung, also call at this station. The station is also served by a few (1)3xx semi-express trains.

== Transfer to downtown ==
Yunlin HSR station, along with Changhua and Chiayi HSR stations, are currently the only three HSR stations with no additional rail service. Thus, Douliu railway station cannot be accessed by Taiwan Railway services, but only by bus.

== Around the station ==
- Huwei Science Park of Central Taiwan Science Park
- NTU Hospital Huwei Campus
- National Formosa University new campus

== See also ==
- List of railway stations in Taiwan
