= Bagua Plateau =

Plateau in central-western Taiwan

Bagua Plateau 八卦台地 (Chinese)
- Plateau
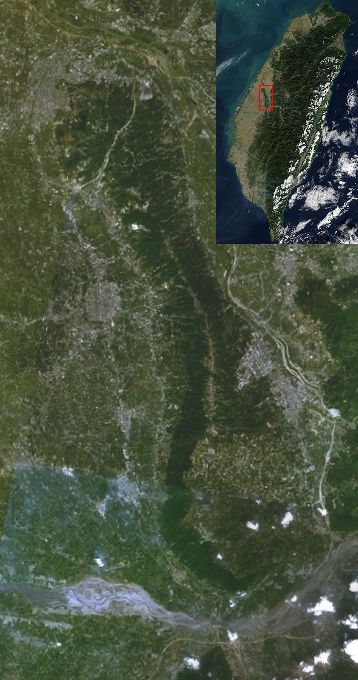

- Location within Taiwan
- Coordinates: 23°55′58.0″N 120°37′36.7″E
- Location: Taiwan
- Geology: Plateau

Dimensions
  - Length: 32 km (20 mi)
  - Width: 7 km (4.3 mi)
- Highest elevation: 442.6 m (1,452 ft) (Mount Hengshan)

The Pakua Plateau or Bagua Plateau (Chinese: 八卦台地; pinyin: Bāguà Táidì), also known as the Pakua Mountain Range (八卦山脈), is a plateau located in central-western Taiwan. It stretches across Changhua County and Nantou County. The plateau borders the Changhua Plain in the west and the Taichung Basin in the east. It is long and narrow, with a length of about 32 km and a width of about 4 to 7 km. The highest peak of the plateau is Hengshan mountain, which has a height of 424m.

== See also ==
- Battle of Baguashan
