= Changhua HSR station =

Railway station in Changhua, Taiwan

Changhua 彰化
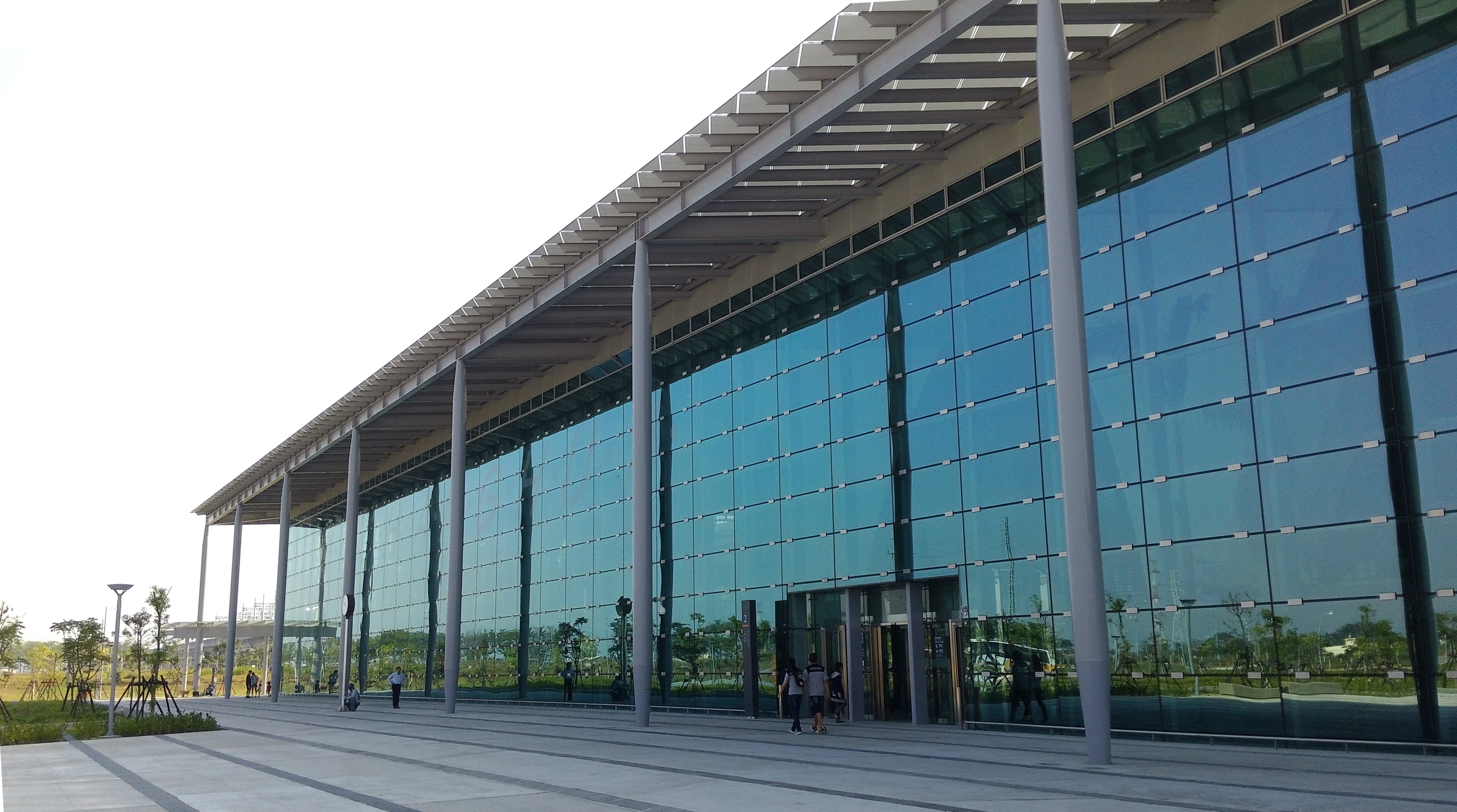
- Station exterior

Chinese name
- Traditional Chinese: 彰化
Transcriptions
Standard Mandarin
- Hanyu Pinyin: Zhānghuà
- Bopomofo: ㄓㄤ ㄏㄨㄚˋ
Hakka
- Romanization: Zóng-fa (Sixian dialect); Zhòng-fǎ (Hailu dialect)
Southern Min
- Tâi-lô: Tsiang-huà; Tsiong-huà

General information
- Location: 99 Zhanqu 2nd Rd; Tianzhong, Changhua County; Taiwan
- Coordinates: 23.8743°N 120.5746°E
- System: THSR railway station
- Line: THSR
- Distance: 193.7 km
- Connections: Coach

Construction
- Structure type: Elevated
- Architect: Kris Yao

Other information
- Station code: CHA／08
- Website: www.thsrc.com.tw/en/StationInfo/prospect/730b59ec-767d-490f-8a16-e4ae62e25cf8

History
- Opened: 2015-12-01

Passengers
- 2018: 1.353 million per year ▲6.5%
- Rank: 12 out of 12

Services
Preceding station	Taiwan High Speed Rail	Following station
Taichung towards Nangang	THSR	Yunlin towards Zuoying
Location
- Location within Taiwan

Changhua (Chinese: 彰化; pinyin: Zhānghuà) is a railway station in Changhua County, Taiwan served by Taiwan High Speed Rail.

== Overview ==
Due to funding problems, Changhua Station was not constructed when Taiwan High Speed Rail first opened for service in 2007, and the detailed design began in 2010. The station opened on 1 December 2015. The station consists of one elevated main station and two side platforms. It is worth mentioning that even though Changhua County is the most populated county in Taiwan, the passenger volume of the HSR station is the lowest among all 12 HSR stations in Taiwan. Due to the location of the station, it cannot service those living in the northern part of the county (Changhua City), and most people who live in Changhua City will take the HSR from Taichung as it is a lot closer to Changhua City than Changhua Station.

Changhua Station currently has no connection to TRA services. A 3-km branch line from Tianzhong railway station connecting to Changhua HSR station is expected to be completed in 2029.

== Architecture ==
The station was designed by Kris Yao with a theme of the natural surroundings of flower, vegetation and water around the station, with a total floor area of 2.2 hectares. The station wall are mainly made of panels of glass. The elevated station has two side platforms.

== HSR services ==
The station is mostly served by 8xx trains which stop at all stations on the Taiwan High Speed Rail. In addition, Southbound Service 583, which departs from Taichung, and Northbound Service 598, which terminates at Taichung, also call at this station. The station is also served by a few (1)3xx semi-express trains.

== Around the station ==
- TR Western Trunk line Shetou Station, Tianzhong Station

== See also ==
- List of railway stations in Taiwan
