= Railway reconstruction in Taiwan =

Since the 1980s, ground level railway facilities in urban areas have been seen as obstacles to road traffic and local development. In 1983, the Executive Yuan tasked the Taipei Railway Underground Project Organisation (TRUPO) with the project to rebuild railway facilities in greater Taipei, completed in 2011. The office would later become the Railway Reconstruction Bureau, then Railway Bureau, responsible for reconstruction in other urban areas. Completed or partially complete reconstruction projects include those for Yuanlin, Pingtung, Taichung and Kaohsiung, with more planned or under construction for Tainan, Taoyuan, Chiayi, Changhua and more.

== Greater Taipei ==
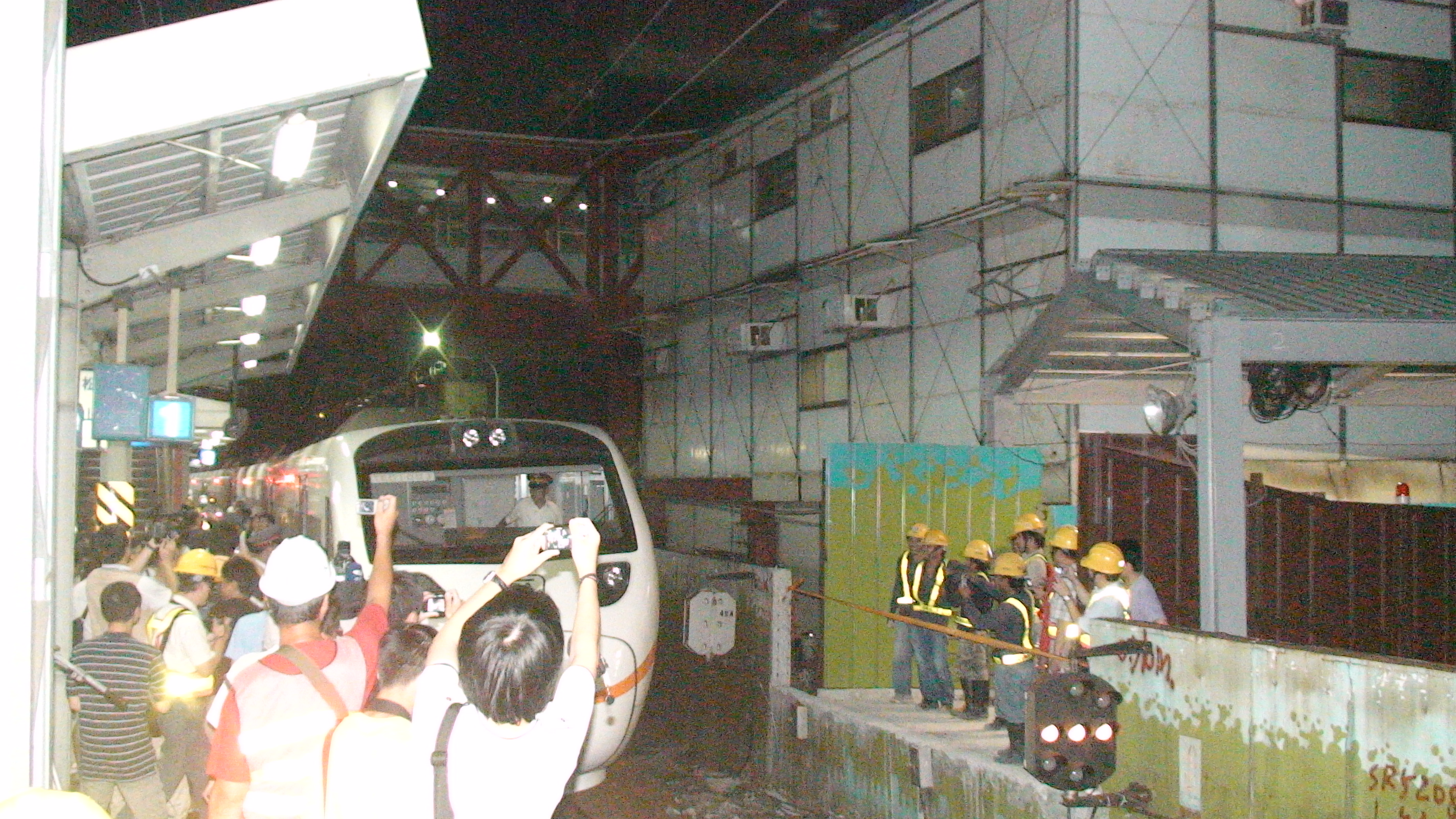
The last train operating on surface trackage in Taipei City before the cut-over to underground trackage built during the Undergroundization Project: Taroko Express No. 1074 on September 20, 2008.

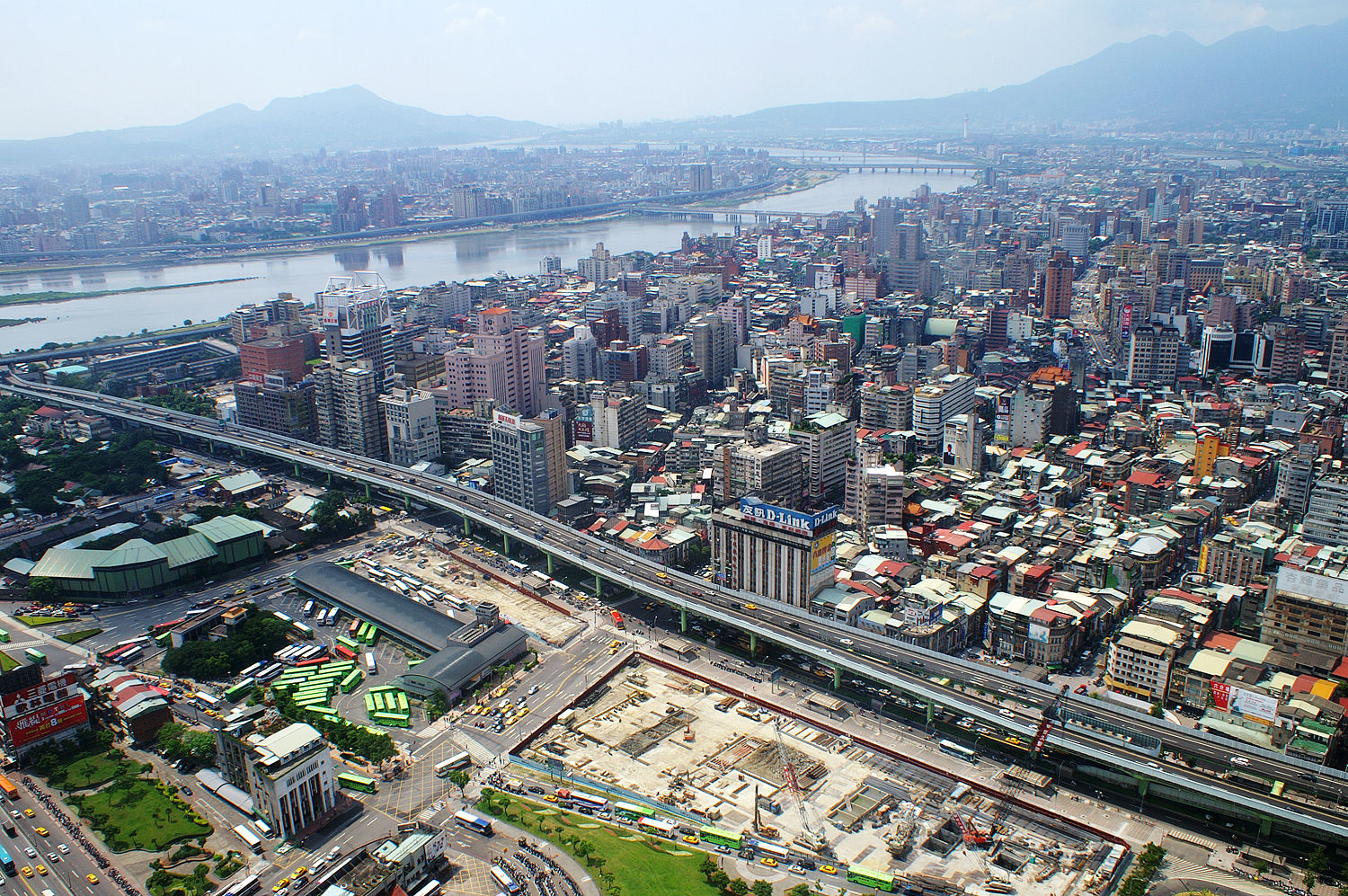
Civic Boulevard Expressway (a second phase project) is an elevated expressway built above underground railway tracks.

In Taipei, a NT$17.792 billion project aimed to move a 4.42 km (2.75 mi) section of railway between Huashan and Wanhua underground. Work began on the project in July 1983 and was completed by September 1989, eliminating 13 railroad crossings. An extension of the project was approved by the Executive Yuan on July 20, 1988. The 5.33 km (3.31 mi) project constructed a double-track tunnel (for both conventional rail and high-speed rail) extending east towards Songshan. The NT$27.48 billion project was completed in June 1994.

The "Wanhua-Banciao Project" was another underground railway project in Taipei aimed at the Wanhua and Banqiao areas. The 15.38 km (9.56 mi) project included the construction of new Banqiao and Wanhua stations. Construction began in September 1992, with underground railway operations beginning in July 1999 and tunnel construction for Taiwan High Speed Rail completed in April 2003. The whole project was completed in 2004. The project also included the construction of a coach yard at Shulin, covering 14.3 ha (143,000 m^{2}) and servicing both diesel multiple units and electric multiple units.

=== Second phase ===
In the nineties, the tunnel was extended both eastward and westward, and with separate double track north and south tunnels, preparation was made for Taiwan High Speed Rail, the planned high-speed line to Kaohsiung. The eastward extension, the Songshan Project, added 5.33 km (3.31 mi) to Songshan. The project cost NT$27.48 billion, and was in construction from July 1989 until June 1994. On the surface, the space gained was used for the construction of the elevated Civic Blvd Expressway, which opened in September 1997.

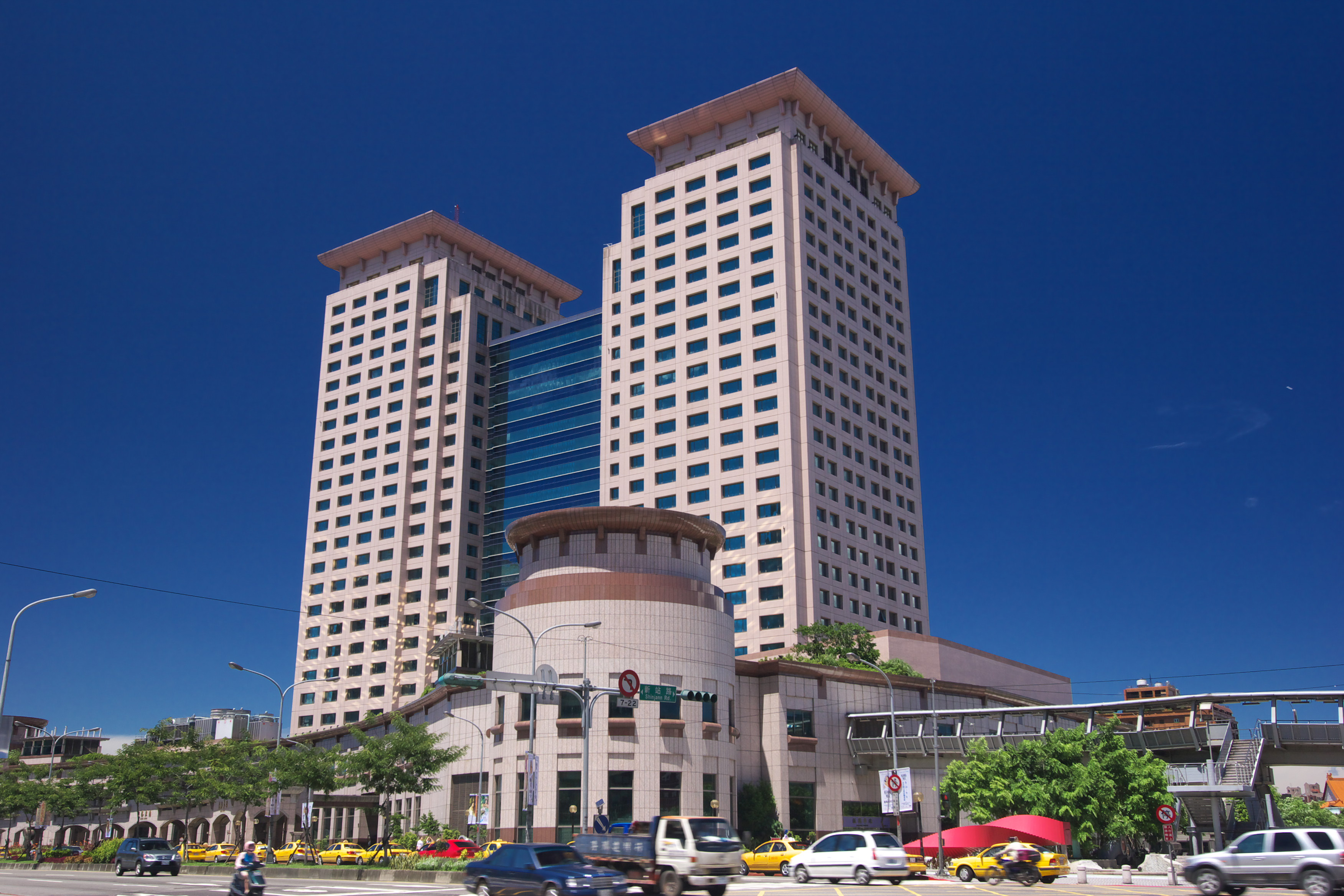
Surface facilities of the new Banqiao Station

The westward extension, the Wanhua–Banqiao Project, added 7.18 km (4.46 mi) to the four-track tunnel section, on a new alignment with the newly built Wanhua Station and the rebuilt Banqiao Station along it. The total project length was 15.38 km (9.56 mi), which included the upgrade of TRA's surface tracks, and a new Shulin Coach Yard at the end of the upgraded section, built to maintain TRA's electric multiple unit (EMU) and diesel multiple unit (DMU) fleet. Work started in September 1992, and TRA began to use the underground tracks in the north tunnel in July 1999.

The extensions also include emergency stations, where passengers can be evacuated in case of fire. The stations and emergency stations were fitted with a smoke suppression system that was tested with simulations and a live evacuation trial in Wanhua Station.

The first 14 km (8.7 mi) of the south tunnel and its exit forms an altogether 15.8 km (9.8 mi) section of the THSR. Civil works were the responsibility of TRUPO.

When work started on the south tunnel, TRA's management was concerned that TRA's capacity would be limited during construction. TRA was to give up the tracks and some station platforms without receiving compensation or rent. The rail unions argued that this arrangement would result in a reduction of TRA services by more than a fourth, and a loss of income and jobs; the union organised a protest rally in March 2002, after which the Ministry of Transport agreed to re-negotiate the TRA–THSRC contract. The cancellation of some TRA train services resulting from the final station platform lease agreement led to another union protest and threat of strike action in February 2003. Unions continued to protest the TRA–THSRC agreement, accusing the government of having favoured THSRC. Civil works in the south tunnel were completed in April 2003.

After the completion of track construction, the western end of the south tunnel went into service on 5 January 2007, when THSRC's high-speed trains began to run between Taipei and Kaohsiung with Banqiao as the Taipei terminus. The service was extended to Taipei Main Station on 2 March 2007. The end of the completed 4.9 km (3.0 mi) track section east of Taipei was put into use as the Songshan Temporary Facility, for servicing the trains.

=== Third phase ===
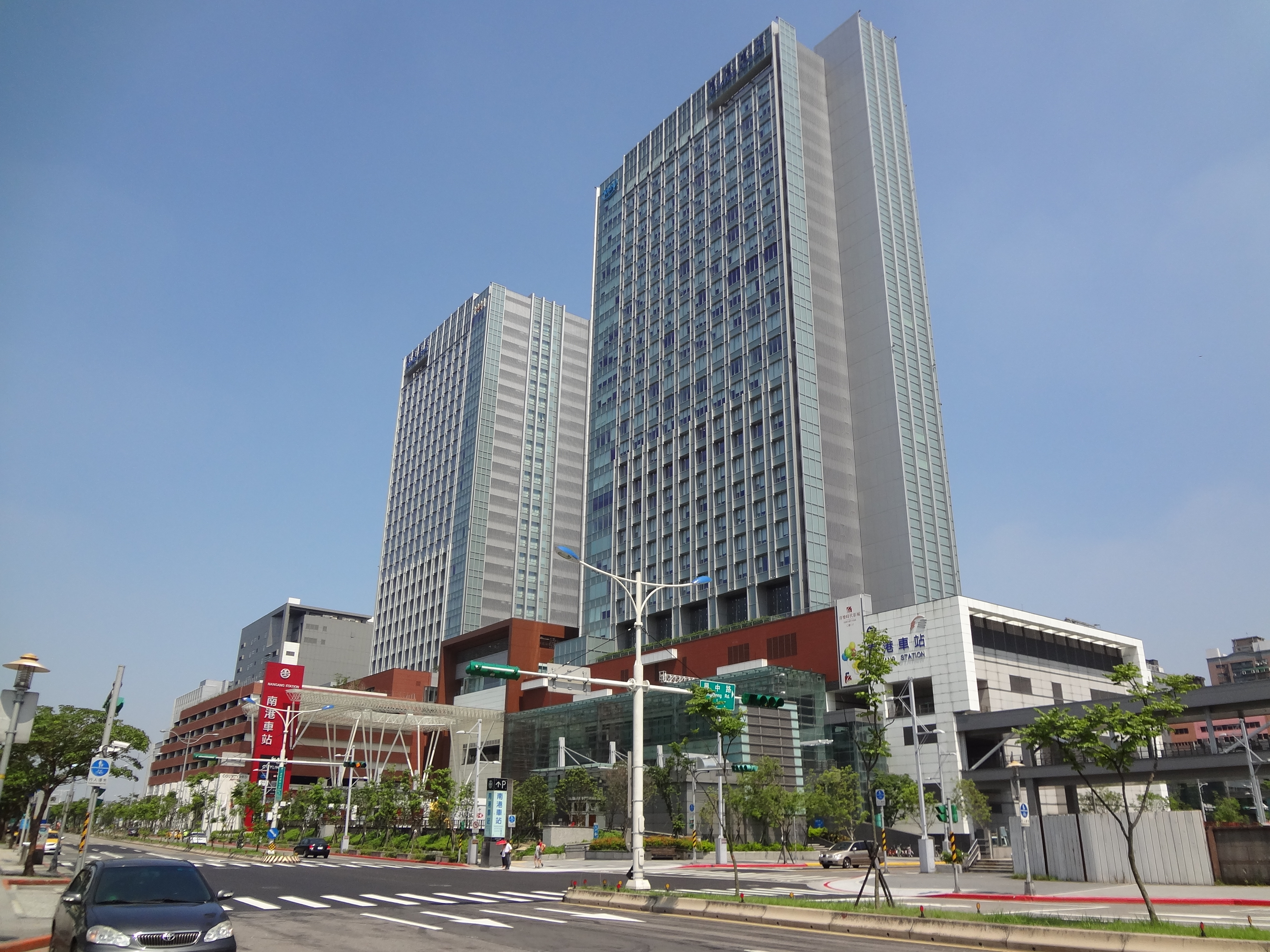
The new Nangang Station was one of the third phase projects.

The NT$83.069 billion Nangang Project completes the Taipei Railway Underground Project with a 5.4 km (3.4 mi) eastward extension of the tunnel, including the rebuilt Songshan and Nangang Stations. East of Nangang along TRA's Western Line, the project also includes a short mountain tunnel and a 5 km (3.1 mi) elevated section. Wudu Freight Yard, near Wudu Station, and Qidu Marshalling Yard, next to Qidu Station, replaces facilities dissolved at Songshan Station. The entire length of the TRA part of the Nangang Project is 19.585 km (12.170 mi) between Songshan and Qidu, and was to be completed in August 2011. Construction was officially completed on 23 October 2011 and began service the following day on 24 October 2011. As a separate NT$10 billion project, in March 2009, TRA also began building a new depot at Fugang, Taoyuan County (now Taoyuan City), to replace its Songshan Depot, which was reached crossing THSRC's tracks.

The "Nangang Project", expected to be completed by August 2011, includes the construction of two 5.4 km (3.4 mi) tunnels between Keelung Road and the Dakeng River (for the TRA and THSR), reconstructing Songshan and Nangang stations as underground stations, construction of a 2 km (1.2 mi) mountain tunnel/ramp for the TRA, construction of a 5 km (3.1 mi) elevated railway, and the construction of the Cidu Marshalling Yard and Wudu Freight Yard. At an estimated cost of NT$83.069 billion, the project is expected to eliminate 15 level crossings and boost the development of the Nangang District. A project to expand the railway tracks between Nangang and Qidu from a double-track to triple-track system is expected to be completed by December 2012, decreasing the interval between trains during peak hours.

Approaching Nangang Station from the west, THSRC's south tunnel swings above TRA's north tunnel, to connect to different levels of Nangang Station. East of Nangang Station, THSR tracks swing to the right, towards THSRC's planned Xizhi Depot. The THSR level of Nangang Station was opened to passengers on 20 September 2016.

With the railroad moved underground in the Songshan-Nangang area, a new 4.7 km (2.9 mi) road was created aboveground running from Keelung Road to Nangang Station. An online ballot was created to let citizens vote on the name of the new road, scheduled to open in October 2011.

== Kaohsiung ==
Since the opening of the new Xinzuoying Station in Zuoying, Kaohsiung, traffic problems have plagued the area. The "Zuoying Extension Plan of the Kaohsiung Railway Underground Project" aims to construct a 4.13 km (2.57 mi)-long single hold, double-tracked tunnel between Xinzuoying and TRA's Zuoying Station. Neiwei Station will also be redeveloped as part of this project.

The "Kaohsiung Project" aims to move railroad lines in Kaohsiung underground as well as the construction of six commuter rail stations. Estimated to cost NT$71.582 billion, the 9.75 km (6.06 mi) tunnel will eliminate six level crossings and fourteen grade separated crossings and remove the railway barrier along the current route. While planning for the project began in 1998, several pre-construction projects have been completed including the movement of the old Kaohsiung Station and the construction of the Jhongbo temporary elevated bridge. The project is expected to be completed by December 2018, and will also include the construction of a new Kaohsiung Station by 2023.

== Shalun ==
The "Shalun Project" was approved on November 5, 2004 and links the TRA and THSR lines around Tainan. The 6.5 km (4.0 mi)-long branch line involved the construction of two brand-new elevated stations: Shalun Station and Chang Jung Christian University Station as well as an elevated Zhongzhou Station. It opened on January 2, 2011.

== Neiwan ==
Similar to the Shalun Project, the Neiwan line was approved on September 27, 2004 to connect THSR Hsinchu Station with Hsinchu City. The project will eliminate eight railway crossings between Hsinchu and Zhuzhong. The line totals 11.1 km (6.9 mi) and was completed in 2011. The Liujia line opened and the Neiwan line reopened on November 11, 2011.
