= Shalun =

Shalun, which is a usual place name in Taiwan, may refer to:

- Shalun, a Russian gunboat
- Shalun Line, a branch line of the Taiwan Railways Administration
  - Shalun railway station, a railway station
- Shalun Village (沙崙里), a village in Dayuan District, Taoyuan City
- Shalun Village (砂崙里), a village in Annan District, Tainan City

== See also ==
- Shalun station (disambiguation)
