= Mitsui Outlet Park Tainan =

- Mitsui Outlet Park 台南

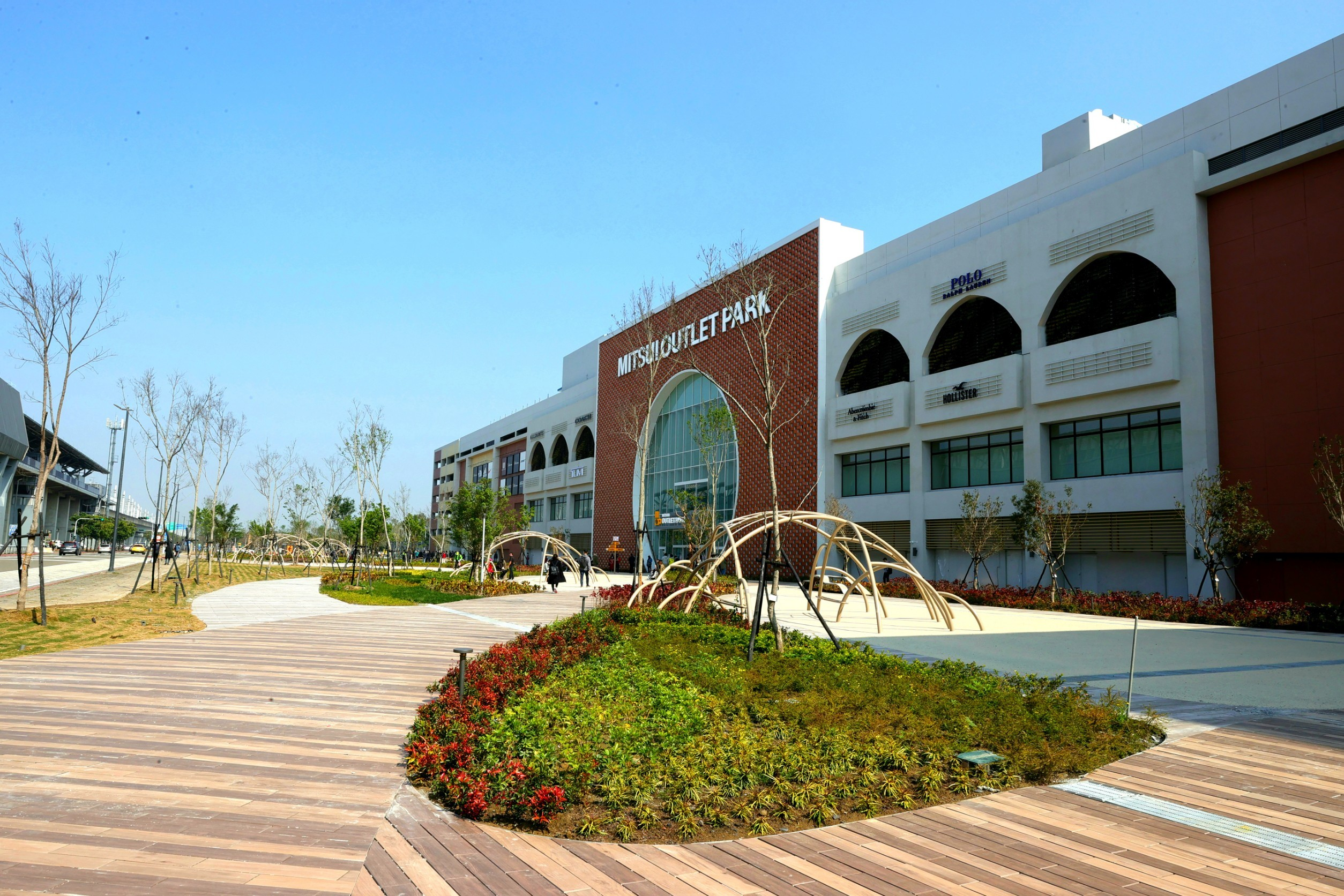
- Location: Gueiren District, Tainan City, Taiwan
- Coordinates: 22.9251°N 120.2873°E
- Opened: February 25, 2022
- Developer: Sannan Outlets Co., Ltd.
- Manager: Mitsui Fudosan Taiwan Co., Ltd.
- Owner: Mitsui Fudosan Co., Ltd.
- Num. of stores: 220
- Floor area: 84,000 m^{2} (900,000 sq ft)
- Public transit: Tainan HSR station; Shalun railway station
- Website: https://www.mop.com.tw/

The Mitsui Outlet Park Tainan (Chinese: Mitsui Outlet Park 台南) is an outlet mall in Gueiren District, Tainan City, Taiwan. With a total floor area of 84,000 m^{2} (900,000 sq ft), construction of the mall started in January 2020. It started trial operations on February 16, 2022 and officially opened on February 25, 2022. Located in close proximity to Tainan HSR station and Shalun railway station, it is Mitsui Fudosan's third base in Taiwan as well as the first outlet mall in Tainan.

== Development history ==
- On October 3, 2018, the newly established project company Sannan Outlets signed a contract with Taiwan's Railway Bureau. The development complex will be divided into two phases, the first phase with 190 stores will be opened in 2021, and the second phase will increase to 220 stores, and it is scheduled to start operations in 2025.
- On January 20, 2020, the groundbreaking ceremony of the first phase of the project was held.
- On February 25, 2022, the first phase of the project is completed and opened.
- On February 2, 2022, the groundbreaking ceremony of the second phase of the project was held.

== Nearby facilities ==
- Tainan HSR station
- Shalun railway station
- ICC Tainan convention center
- National Cheng Kung University Kuei-Jen Campus
- National Yang Ming Chiao Tung University Guiren Campus
- Shalun Smart Green Energy Science City
- Academia Sinica South Campus
- National Science and Technology Council Cybersecurity & Smart Technology R&D Building

== Gallery ==
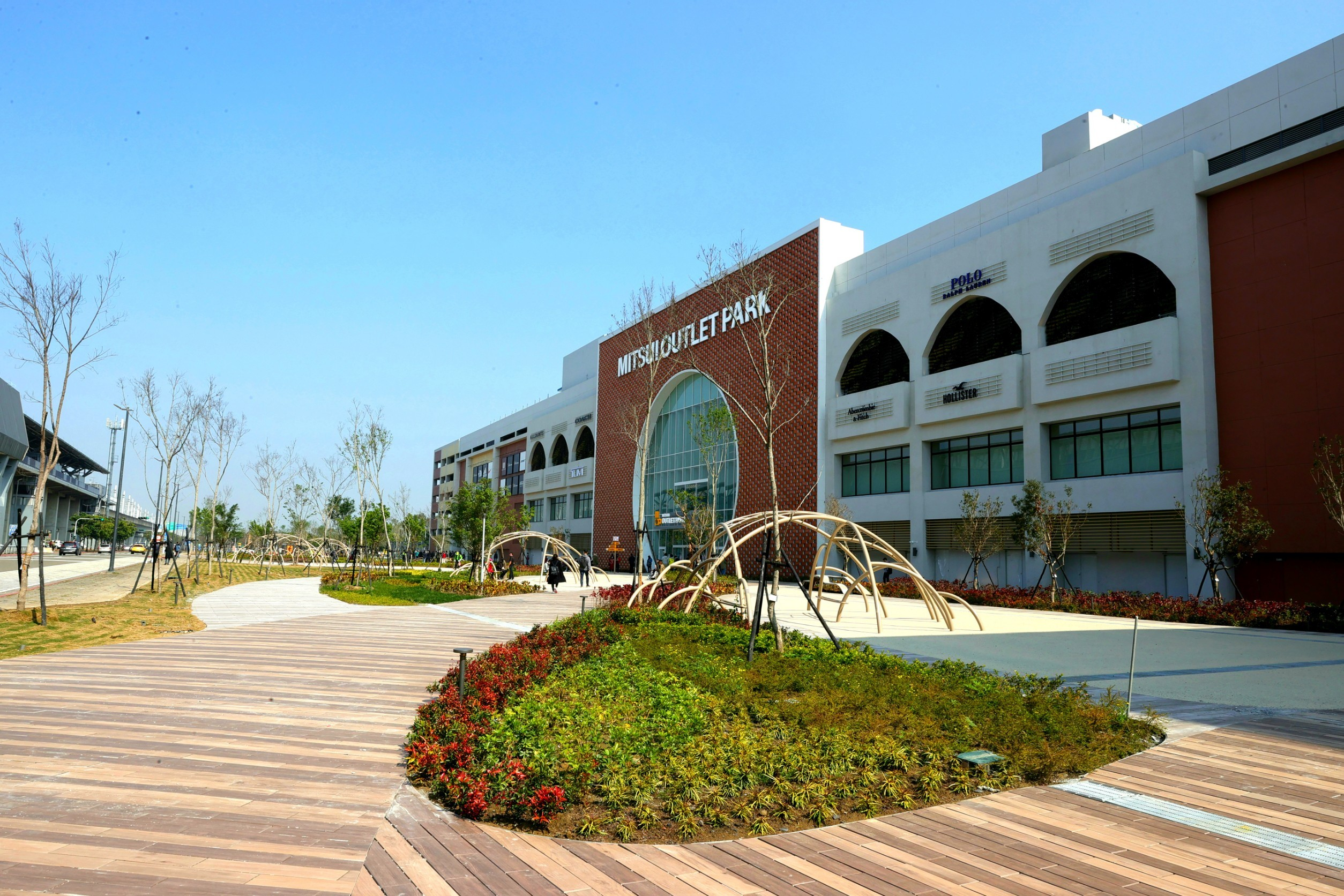
Exterior

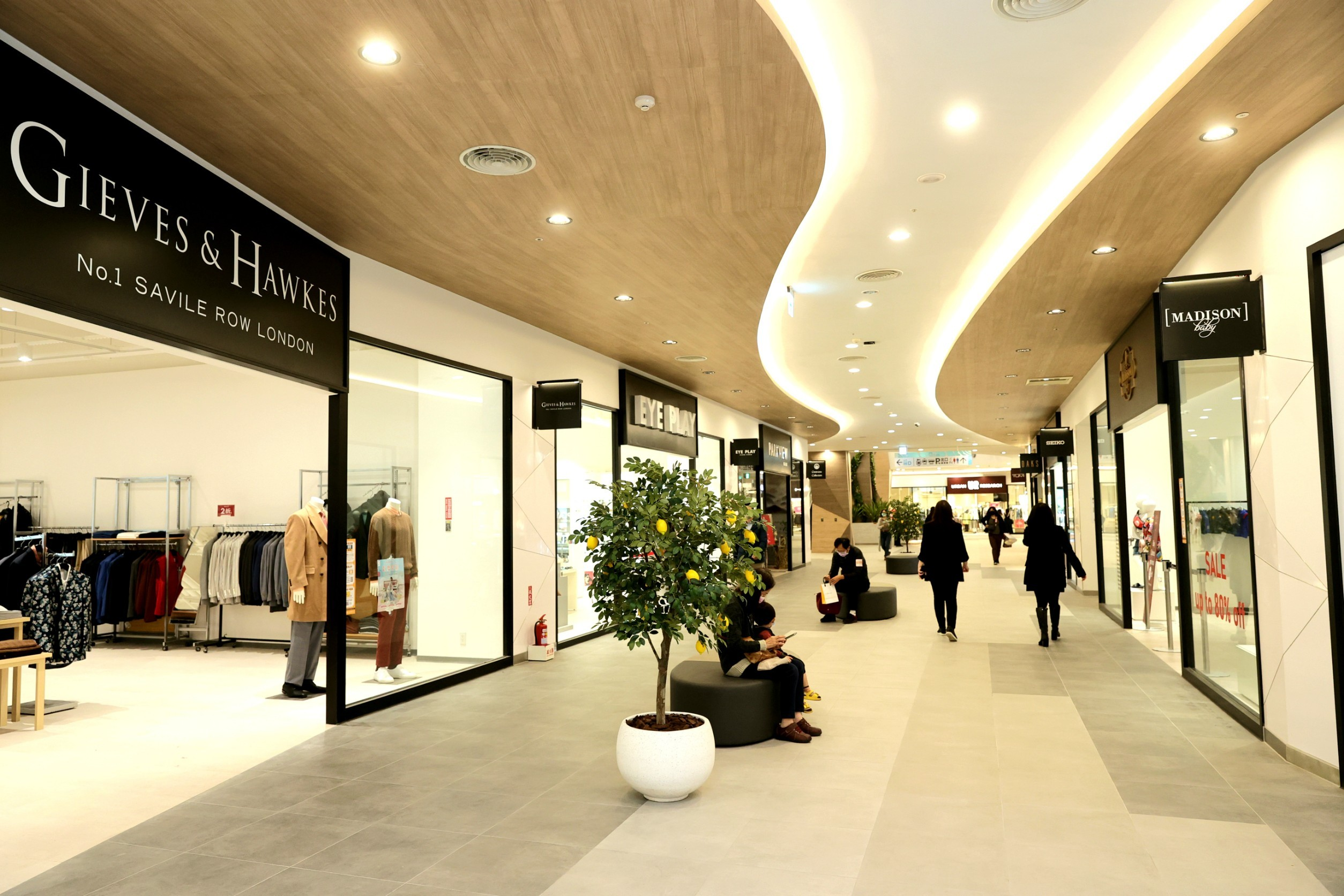
Interior

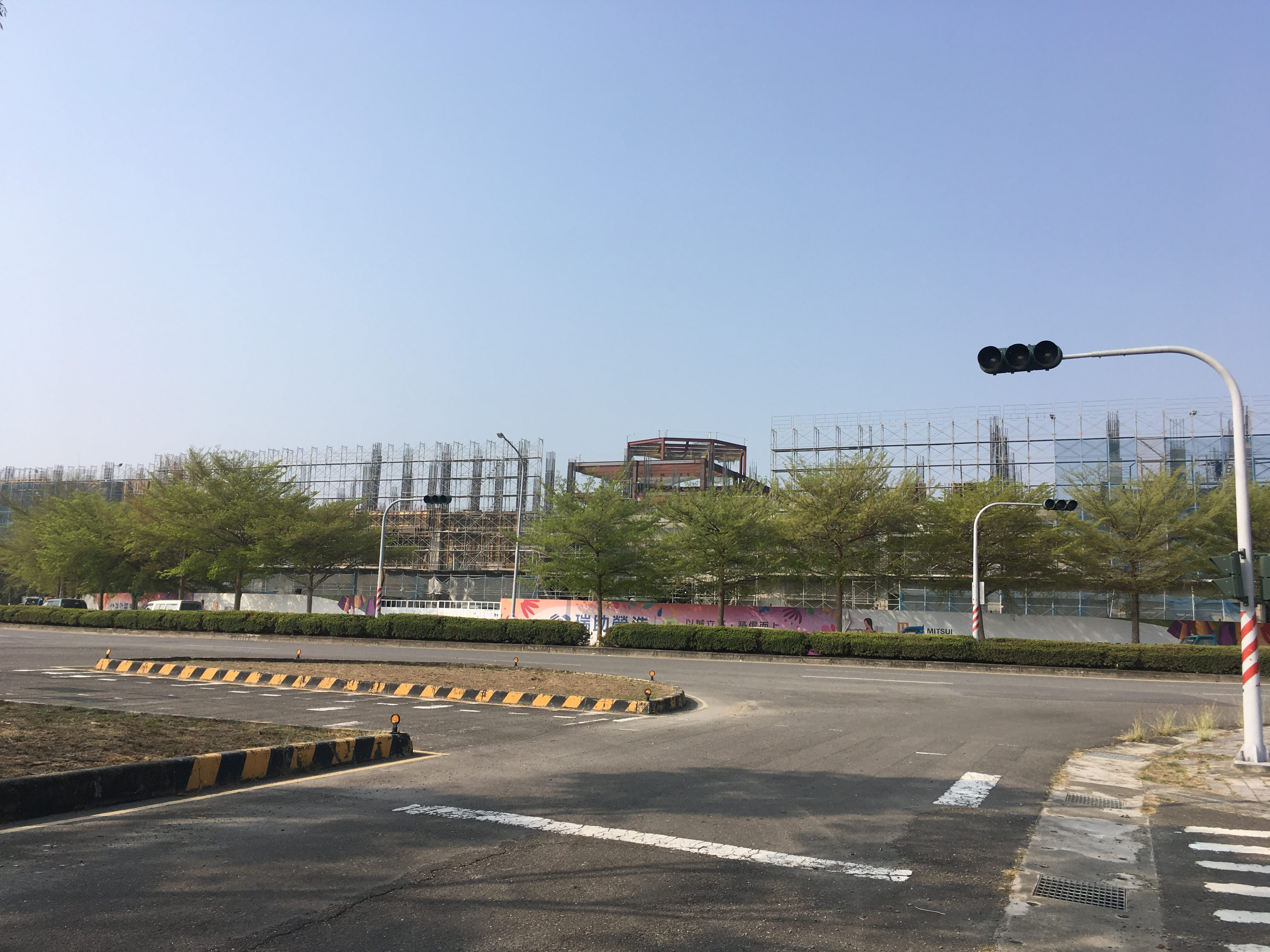
Under construction in March 2021

== See also ==
- List of tourist attractions in Taiwan
- Mitsui Outlet Park Taichung
- Mitsui Outlet Park Linkou
