= Tainan Station =

Tainan station (Chinese: 臺南車站; pinyin: Táinán chēzhàn) may refer to the following stations in Tainan, Taiwan:

- Tainan HSR station, a Taiwan High Speed Rail station in Gueiren, opened in 2007
- Tainan railway station, a TRA station on the West Coast line in East District, opened in 1900
