= Liu Huang A-tao =

Taiwanese activist

- Traditional Chinese: 劉黃阿桃
- Simplified Chinese: 刘黄阿桃
Transcriptions
Standard Mandarin
- Hanyu Pinyin: Liúhuáng Ātáo
- Wade–Giles: Liu^{2}huang^{2} A^{1}t'ao^{2}
Southern Min
- Hokkien POJ: Lâu N̂g A-thô

Liu Huang A-tao (Pe̍h-ōe-jī: Lâu N̂g A-thô, 1923 – 1 September 2011) was a Taiwanese activist. She was one of thousands of women from Japanese occupied Taiwan who were forced into sexual slavery as comfort women by the Japanese military during World War II. Liu Huang became the first Taiwanese woman to sue the Japanese government for compensation and a public apology in 1999, a move which united her with eight other comfort women survivors. Her public campaign and push for compensation earned her the nickname Grandma A-tao.

== Biography ==
=== World War II captivity ===
Liu Huang, who was 19 years old at the time, entered into the Japanese nursing corps in 1942 during World War II. She was promised work as a nurse in the medical field for the Japanese forces, but instead was pressed into sexual slavery as a comfort woman for Japanese troops. Liu Huang was sent to Indonesia where she was immediately forced to work at a battlefield brothel as a comfort woman as soon as she disembarked from the transport ship. She was seriously wounded during heavy fighting just three days after her arrival in Indonesia. Liu Huang had to have a hysterectomy owing to the extent of her injuries. She survived, but was forced to work as a comfort woman for the Japanese for the next three years, despite her extensive wounds.

=== Post-War ===
Liu Huang returned to Taiwan in 1945 after the Surrender of Japan and the end of World War II. However, she kept experiences as a comfort woman a secret following the war. Liu Huang married a retired Taiwanese soldier and adopted a child with her husband. However, her experience as a comfort woman left a deep emotional scar.

=== Activism ===
The experiences of survivors of the comfort women program were largely ignored for decades in post-war Asia. The issue finally emerged into the public sphere during the 1980s, when a group of survivors in neighboring South Korea filed several lawsuits against the Japanese government. Documents were uncovered in 1991 which forced the Japanese government to issue an apology and "remorse to all those, irrespective of place of origin, who suffered immeasurable pain and incurable psychological wounds" to Korean comfort women.

Liu Huang, who had remained largely silent about her own experiences for decades, was encouraged by the actions of the former South Korean comfort women. In 1995, Japan tried to quietly pay former comfort women compensation for war crimes committed against them through a program called the "Asian Women's Fund". Most survivors refused the private offer. That same year, Liu Huang, who was inspired by the South Korean legal movement, began meeting other Taiwanese survivors through the Taipei Women's Foundation, an organization aimed at advocating the rights of former comfort women.

In 1999, Liu Huang became the first former Taiwanese comfort woman to file an international lawsuit against the Japanese government and publicly demand an apology for her forced imprisonment and sexual slavery during the war. Her lawsuit united her with eight fellow Taiwanese comfort women survivors. When asked about her experience, she replied, "It is not us, but the Japanese government that should feel ashamed," echoing the slogans of the South Korean women who had sued during the 1980s.

Each of Liu Huang's lawsuits were dismissed in the Japanese courts, beginning in 2002 with the loss of her first case. In an interview about the dismissals, Liu Huang told a journalist, "We are all cherished daughters in the eyes of our parents. Since the Japanese army robbed us of our virginity, it is not too much to demand an apology from such a government." The Taipei Women's Rescue Foundation, which supported Liu Huang, changed tactics and collaborated with legal groups in Japan and South Korea to advocate for legislation in the Diet to address the comfort women's grievances. The proposal for compensation was introduced to parliament by the Democratic Party of Japan, which was the main opposition party at the time, but the legislation was defeated. Liu Huang's most recent lawsuit was filed in 2010 in Tokyo and the case is still pending, as of September 2011.

Liu Huang died from a heart attack on 1 September 2011, at the age of 90. Her death left just ten surviving Taiwanese comfort women, awaiting an apology. Her funeral was held on 10 September 2011, in the southern city of Kaohsiung, Taiwan. The city of Taipei has announced plans to build a memorial to the women in Datong District, Taipei.
