= Shalun Station =

Shalun (Chinese: 沙崙; pinyin: Shālún) station may refer to the following stations in Taiwan:

- Shalun light rail station, a light rail station of the Danhai light rail
- Shalun railway station, a railway station of the Taiwan Railways Administration

== See also ==
- Binhai Shalun light rail station, a light rail station of the Danhai light rail
