= Taiwan High Speed Rail Museum =

Museum in Zhongli, Taoyuan City, Taiwan

- 台灣高鐵探索館

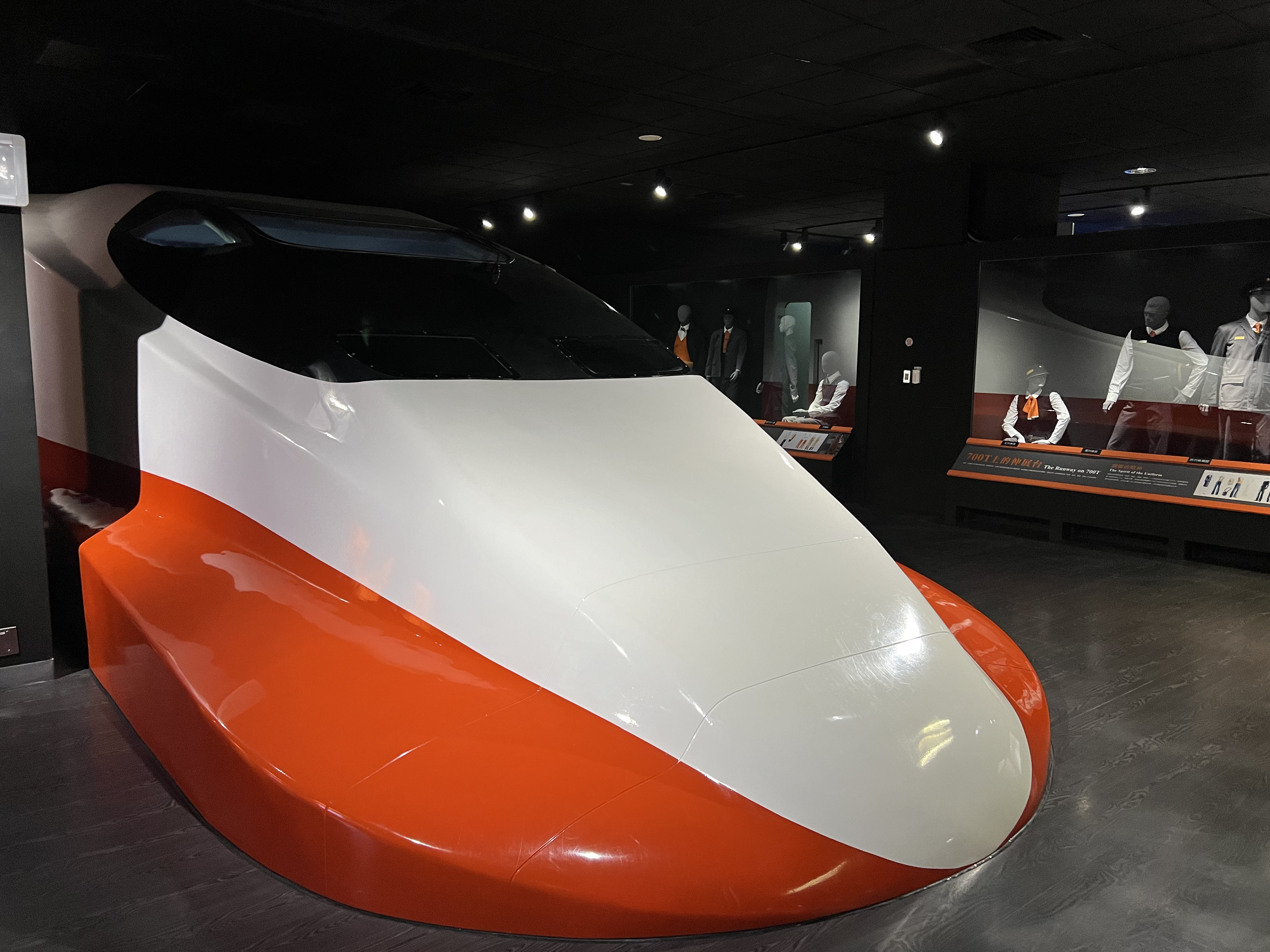
- Established: 5 January 2017
- Location: Zhongli, Taoyuan City, Taiwan
- Coordinates: 25°00′42.7″N 121°12′49.0″E
- Type: Railway museum
- Director: Yi-Han Wu
- Public transit access: Taoyuan HSR Station Taoyuan Metro
- Website: Official website

The Taiwan High Speed Rail Museum (traditional Chinese: 台灣高鐵探索館; simplified Chinese: 台湾高铁探索馆; pinyin: Táiwān Gāotiě Tànsuǒ Guǎn) is a museum in Zhongli District, Taoyuan City, Taiwan. The museum is run by the Taiwan High Speed Rail Corporation and showcases the history and operation of Taiwan's High Speed Rail. It is located in the same building as the Taoyuan THSR Operation Management Center. The museum is free to the public but entrance is by appointment only.

== History ==
In 2003, Taiwan High Speed Rail Corporation launched the "THSR Memorabilia Collection Project" which aimed to collect railway cultural relics during the line's construction. These items were on display at the first iteration of the museum, which operated from August 2004 to October 2006 in the Hsinchu HSR station.

The museum's current iteration opened on 5 January 2017 to commemorate the company's 10th anniversary in a ceremony attended by Premier Lin Chuan and Transportation and Communications Minister Hochen Tan.

From 2017 through 2023, the museum has had a guest count of over 223,000 visits.

== Exhibitions ==
The museum consists of 25 themed exhibitions, including those on the history and construction of the High Speed Rail, train construction and repair, and other high-speed rail systems worldwide. It also features a driver's cab simulator and various interactive displays.

A large amount of models are also on display, including models of Taiwan's High Speed Rail Stations and various trains from all over the world. Also on display is a large model train set where multiple THSR 700T run along a miniaturized version of the trains south to north route.

== Transportation ==
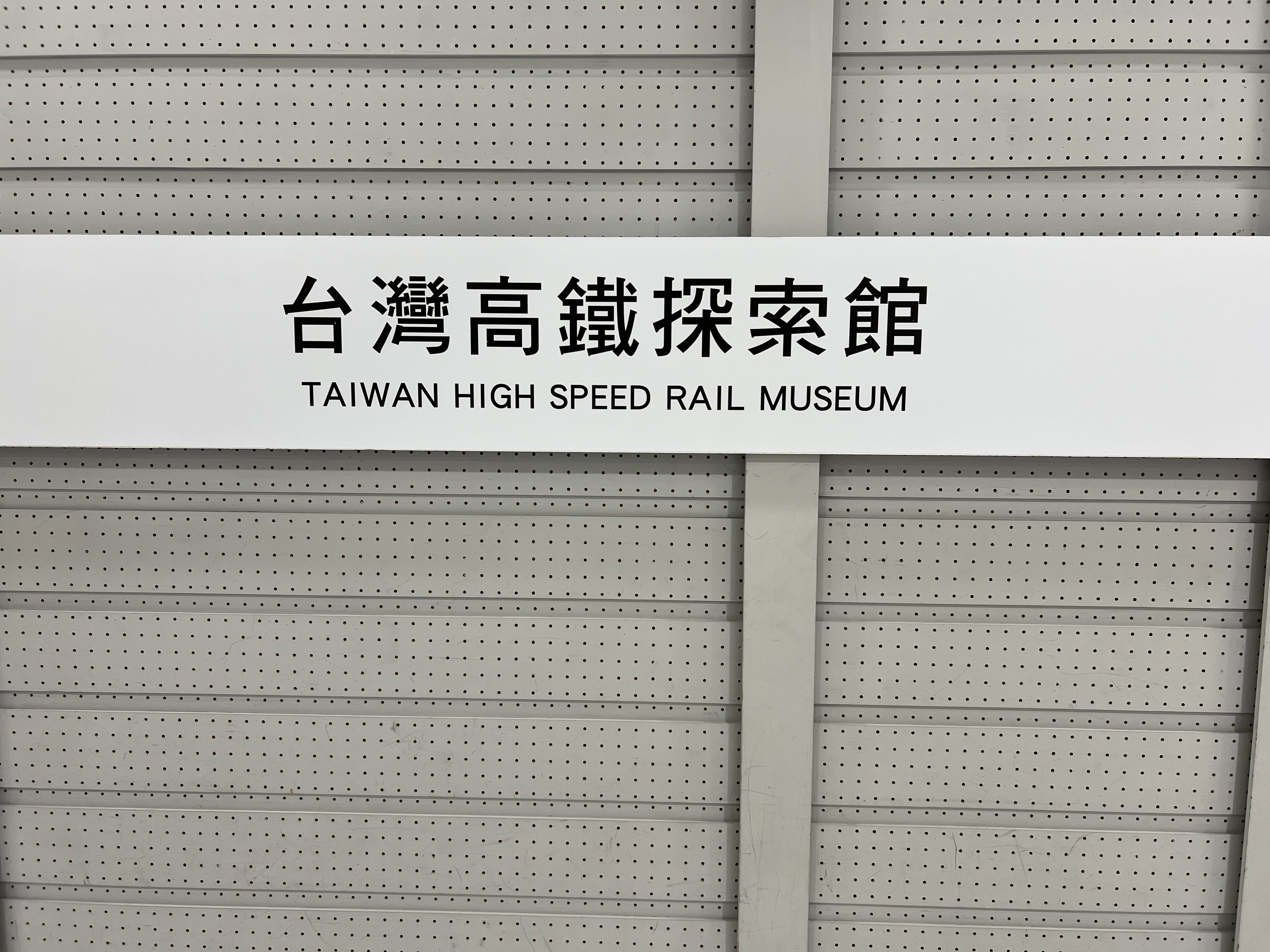
Taiwan High Speed Rail Museum sign in Chinese and English

The museum is a 5-minute walk from both the Taoyuan HSR Station and the A18 THSR Taoyuan Station of the Taoyuan Metro. It is also accessible via several bus routes.

== See also ==
- Taiwan High Speed Rail
- List of museums in Taiwan
- Oiran Train Scenic Park
- Category:Railway museums in Taiwan
