= Guiren Living Art Center =

Art center in Guiren, Tainan, Taiwan

- 歸仁美學館
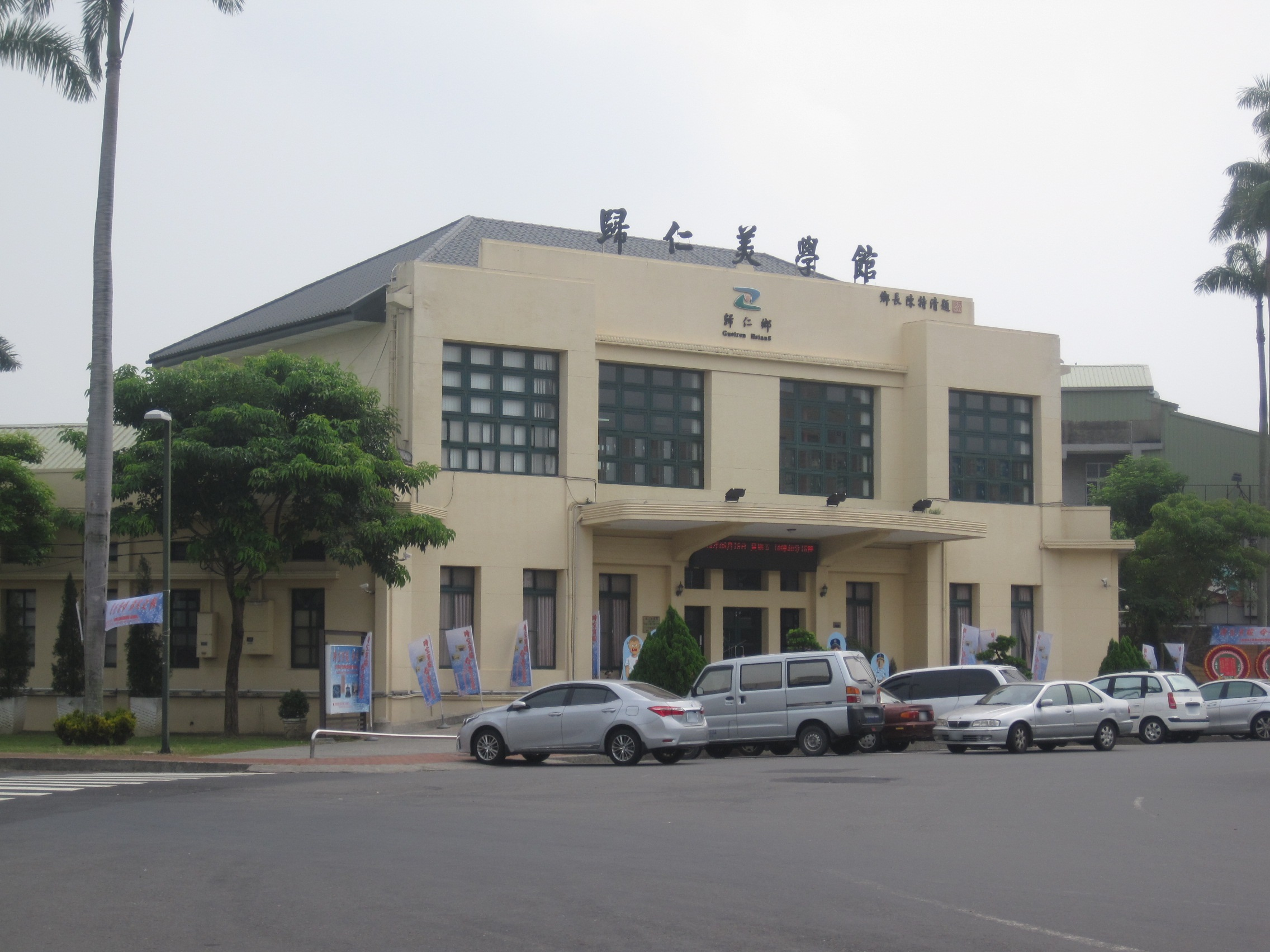
- Interactive map of Guiren Living Art Center
- Former names: Guiren Police Precinct
- Location: Gueiren, Tainan, Taiwan
- Coordinates: 22°58′01.6″N 120°17′41.0″E
- Type: art center

Construction
- Built: 1934

The Guiren Living Art Center (traditional Chinese: 歸仁美學館; simplified Chinese: 归仁美学馆; pinyin: Guīrén Měixué Guǎn) is an art center in Gueiren District, Tainan, Taiwan.

== History ==
The art center building was originally constructed in 1934 as the village office for Kijin Village of Tainan Prefecture. After the handover of Taiwan from Japan to the Republic of China in 1945, the building was used as the Guiren Police Precinct under the Police Bureau of Tainan County Government. After the police station had been relocated, the building was left idle for a while. Later on, it was renovated into a living art center named Guiren Living Art Center.

== Architecture ==
The center is housed in a yellow-colored building. The former detention rooms from the previous police station were left intact and have been integrated into the building overall layout. It consists of exhibition rooms, reading areas and computer room.

== Exhibitions ==
The center displays various exhibitions and a collection of books.

== Activities ==
The center has also become the venue for sports, especially aerobic and yoga classes.

== See also ==
- List of tourist attractions in Taiwan
