= Chang Jung Christian University railway station =

Railway station in Gueiren, Tainan, Taiwan

Chang Jung Christian University 長榮大學
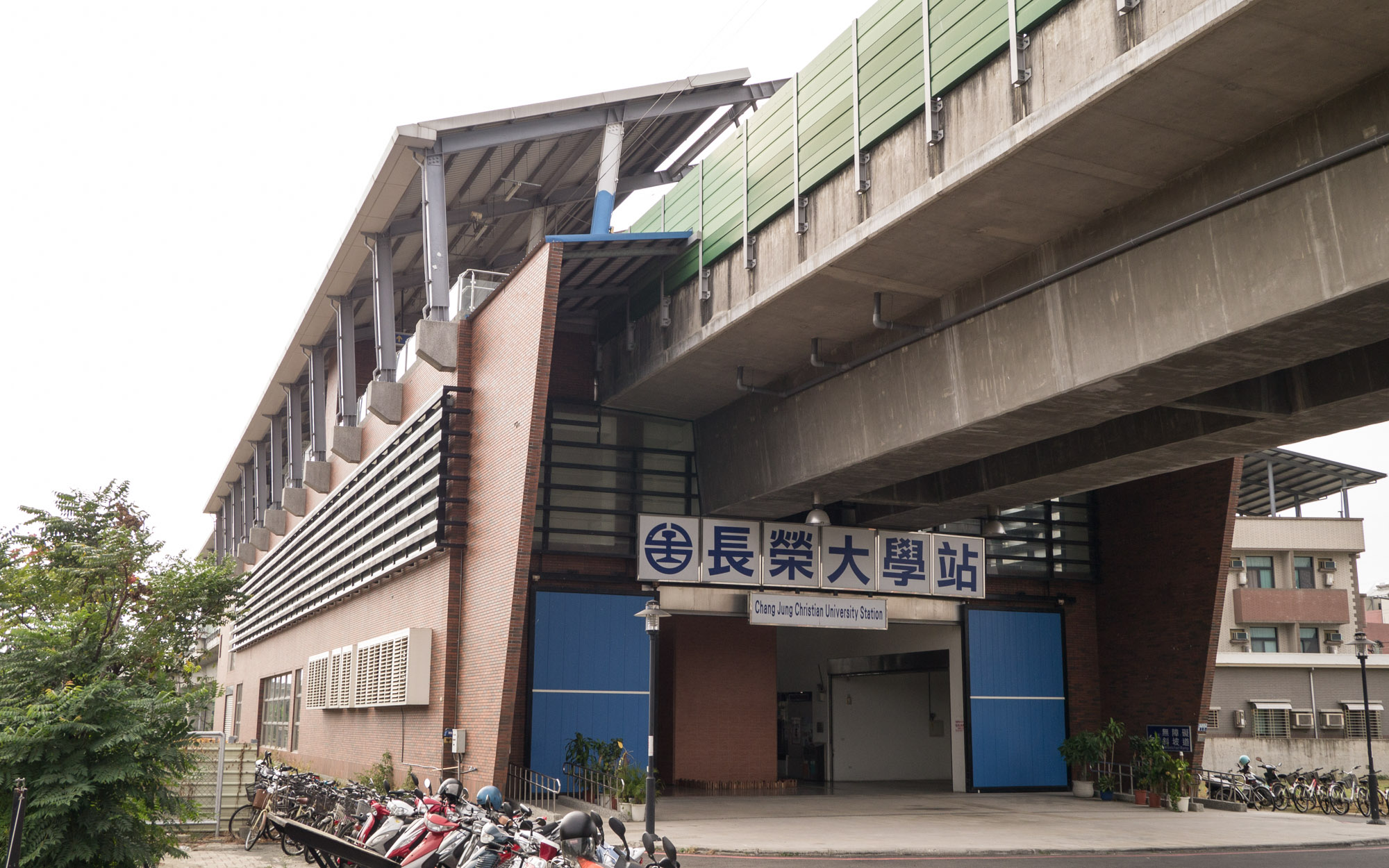

General information
- Location: Gueiren, Tainan, Taiwan
- Coordinates: 22°54′26″N 120°16′22″E
- Operator: Taiwan Railway
- Line: Shalun line
- Distance: 2.6 km from Zhongzhou

Construction
- Structure type: Elevated

Other information
- Classification: 簡易站 (Taiwan Railways Administration level)

History
- Opened: 2 January 2011
Location

Chang Jung Christian University (Chinese: 長榮大學車站; pinyin: Chángróng Dàxué chēzhàn) is a railway station on Taiwan Railway (TR) Shalun line in Gueiren District, Tainan, Taiwan.

== Name ==
The station was named after the nearby Chang Jung Christian University.

== History ==
The station was opened on 2 January 2011. Similar to other stations on the line, it is equipped with multiple card-reading machines.

== See also ==
- List of railway stations in Taiwan

Preceding station	Taiwan Railway	Following station
Zhongzhou Terminus	Shalun line	Shalun Terminus
