= Shalun line =

Railway line in Taiwan

Shalun Line 沙崙線
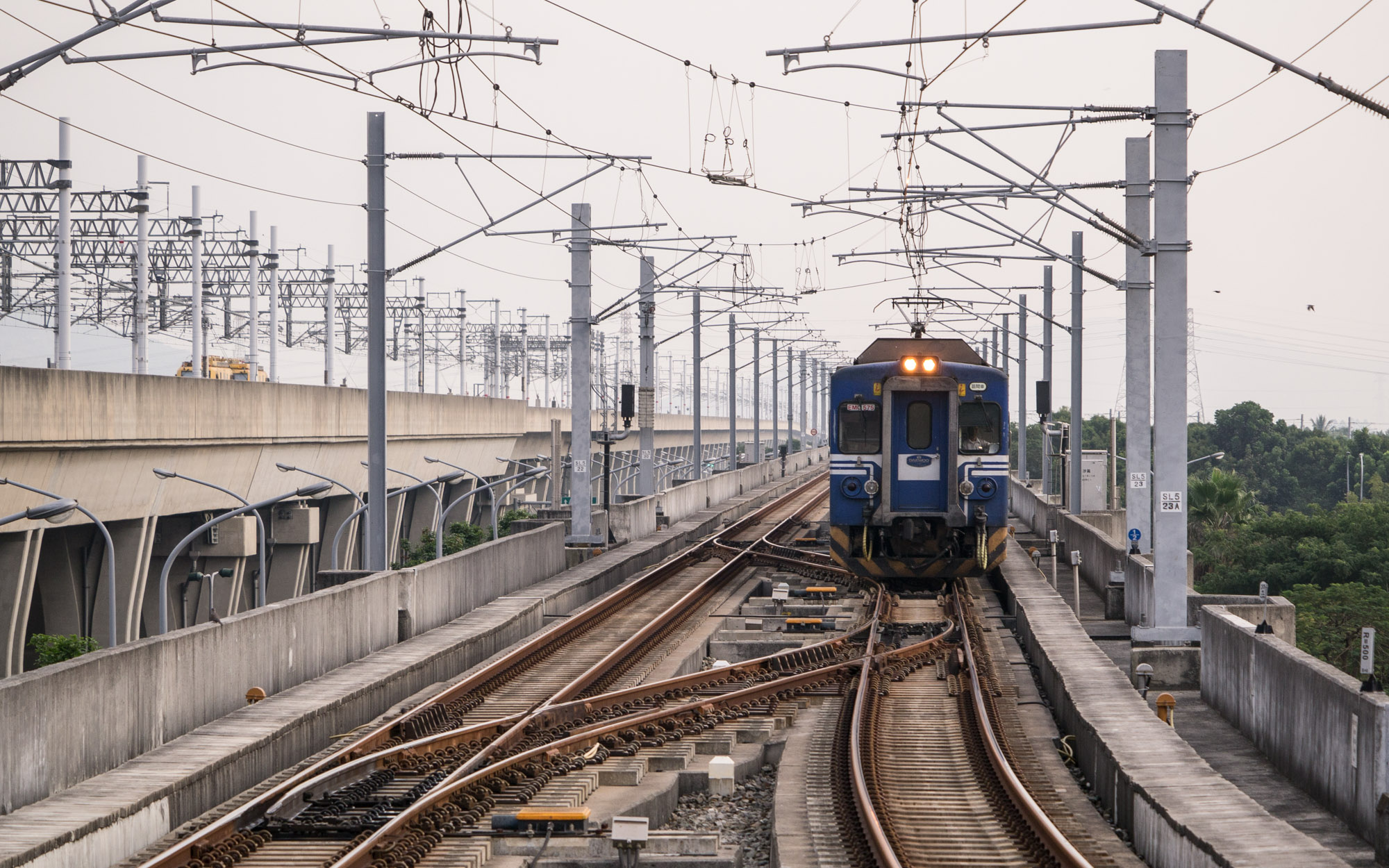

Overview
- Status: In operation
- Owner: Taiwan Railway Corporation
- Locale: Tainan, Taiwan
- Termini: Zhongzhou, Rende District; Shalun, Gueiren District
- Stations: 3

Service
- Type: Heavy rail
- System: Taiwan Railway
- Operator(s): Taiwan Railway Corporation

History
- Opened: January 2, 2011

Technical
- Line length: 5.3 km (3.3 mi)
- Character: Elevated
- Track gauge: 3 ft 6 in (1,067 mm) narrow gauge

The Shalun Line (Chinese: 沙崙線; pinyin: Shālún xiàn; Pe̍h-ōe-jī: Soa-lūn Soàⁿ) is a branch line of the Taiwan Railway (TR) West Coast line in Tainan, Taiwan. It was built to link the Western line to the Taiwan High Speed Rail (THSR) Tainan station, speeding up transit times between downtown Tainan and the THSR station, with services running from Nanke railway station or Tainan TRA station to Shalun Station, next to the THSR station. The line opened on January 2, 2011.

== History ==
The Shalun line was proposed as a solution to the lack of a rail connection between the Tainan metropolitan area and the Taiwan High Speed Rail station in Gueiren. Originally, in plans developed in the 1990s, the Red line of the planned Tainan MRT system was designed to address this issue, but financial considerations meant the MRT project had to be shelved indefinitely. After public consultation the Executive Yuan decided to prioritize a regular rail link between the THSR and TRA rail systems. The initial budget for the construction of the Shalun line was NT$5.8 billion.

== Construction ==
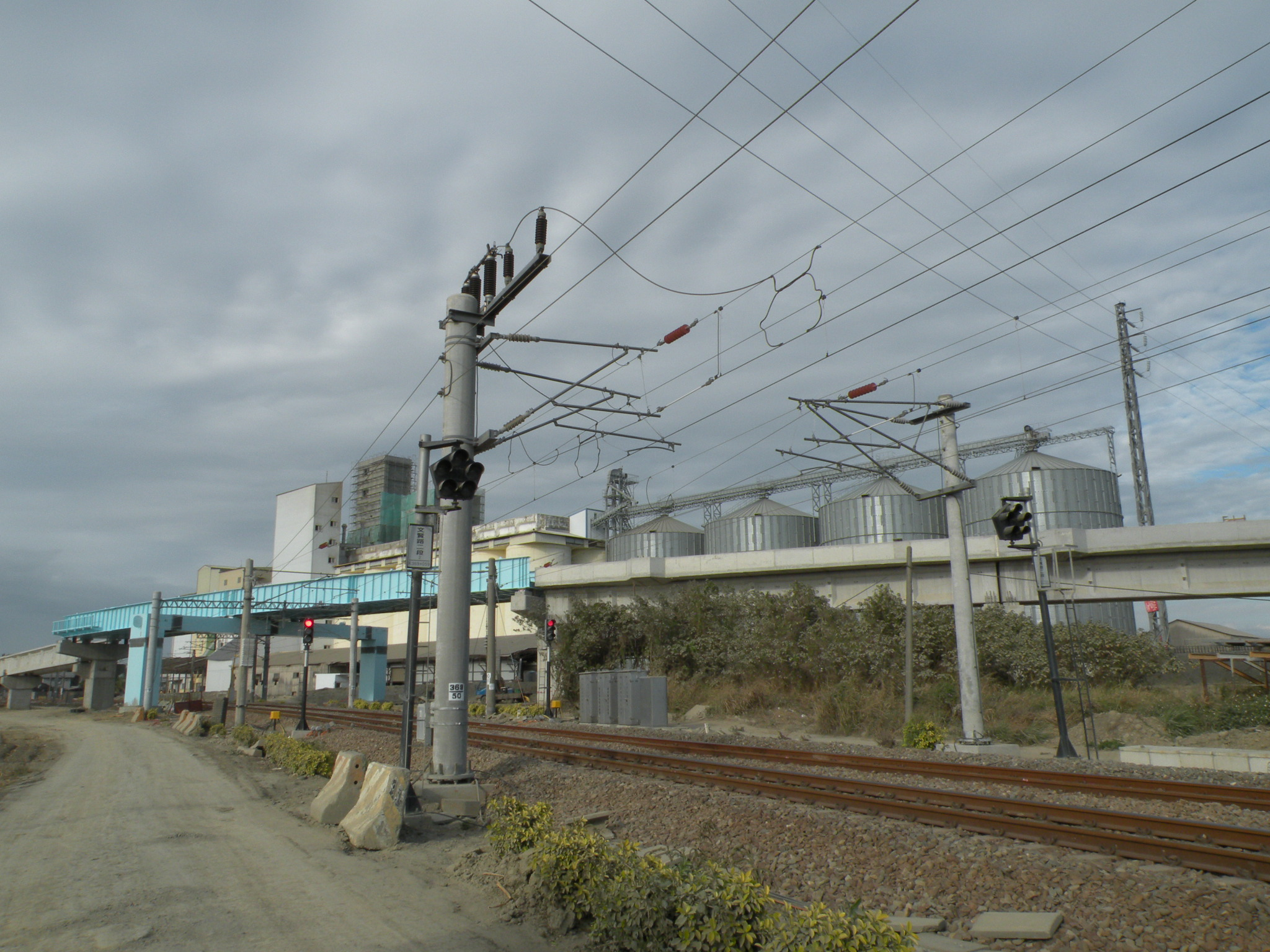
The junction of the Shalun and Western Main lines

With the exception of the end of the junction with the Western line, the line is completely elevated. Work was originally planned to be completed in 2009, but due to flood prevention work on Erren River, which crosses under the rail line, the completion date was pushed back to January 2011. There have been some complaints from local residents that the increased number of trains passing through Tainan will increase the number of times road traffic must stop at level crossings to let trains pass. The line has three stations: the existing TR Western line Zhongzhou station, which was renovated and modified as a junction station, and the newly built Chang Jung University, and Shalun stations.

== Operation ==
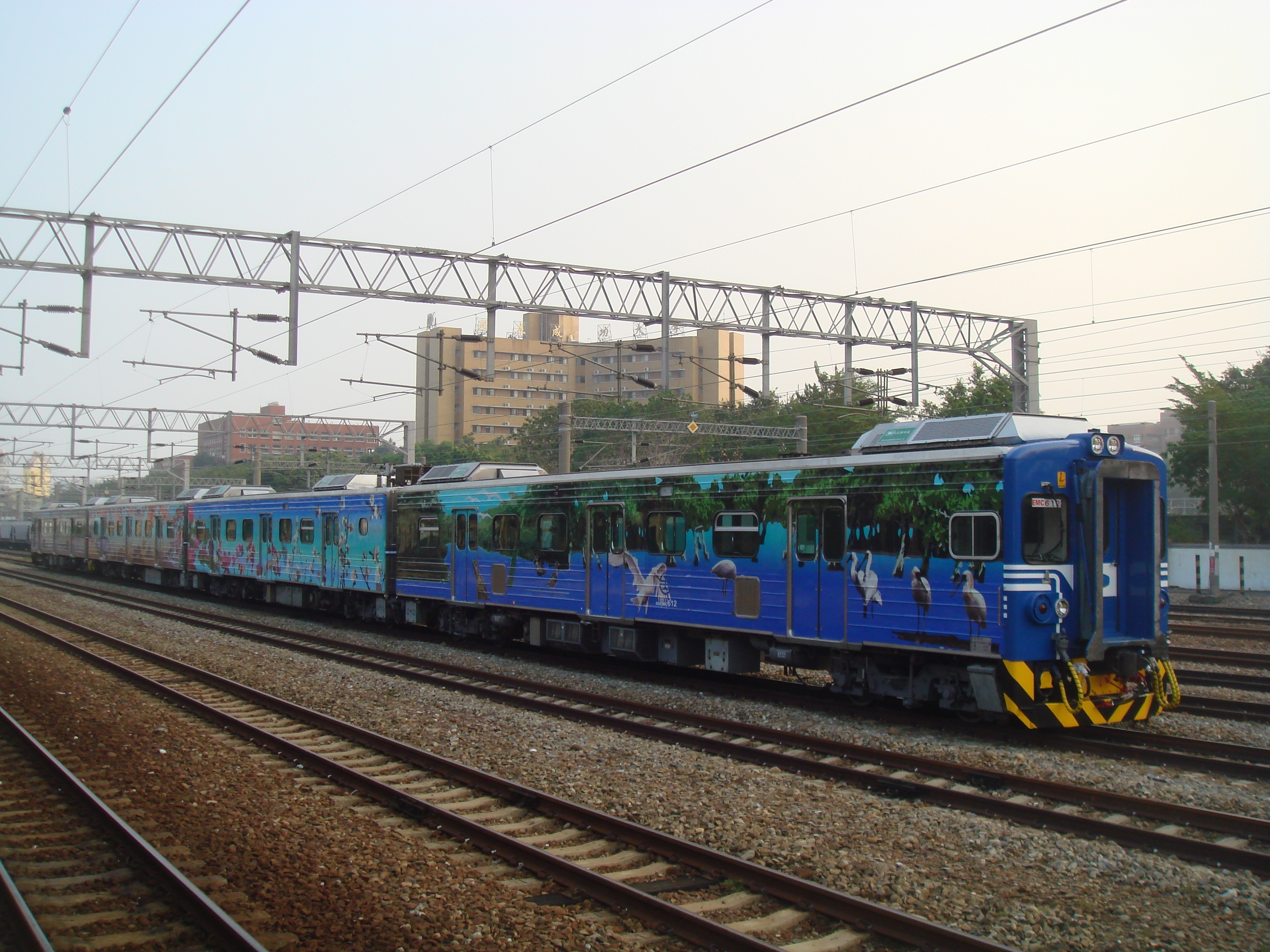
An EMU600 series train, in special livery for Shalun line service, at TR Tainan station

Longer services run between TR Western line's Nanke station, near Tainan Science Park in Tainan's Sinshih District, and Shalun station; with intermediate stops at Xinshi, Yongkang, Daqiao, Tainan, Bao'an, Rende, Zhongzhou, and Chang Jung University. Shorter services run between Tainan and Shalun. Further plans foresee the construction of a new station, Linsen station, and the reopening of the previously closed South Tainan station, both in the Tainan metropolitan area. An additional station was considered at Tainan Airport, but was cancelled.

The line opened on January 2, 2011 as TRA's first new line in 20 years. The line cut the journey time between TR Tainan and THSR Tainan stations to 21–22 minutes, compared to the shuttle bus travel time of around 50 minutes. The ticket price for a Tainan–Shalun ride was set at NT$25, but travel was free during the first two weeks. The initial schedule contained 70 trains a day.

LCD screens aboard each train allow passengers to view instant location and transfer information, similar to Tokyo's Yamanote Line.

== Stations ==
Name	Chinese	Taiwanese	Hakka	Distance	Transfers and notes	Location	
Zhongzhou	中洲	Tiong-chiu	Chûng-chû	0 km	→ West Coast line	Rende	Tainan
Chang Jung Christian University	長榮大學	Tióng-êng Tāi-ha̍k	Chhòng-yùng Thai-ho̍k	2.6 km		Gueiren	Tainan
Shalun	沙崙	Soa-lūn	Sâ-lûn	5.3 km	Tainan HSR station	Gueiren	Tainan
