= Shalun Smart Green Energy Science City =

Industrial park in Guiren, Tainan, Taiwan

Shalun Smart Green Energy Science City 沙崙智慧綠能科學城
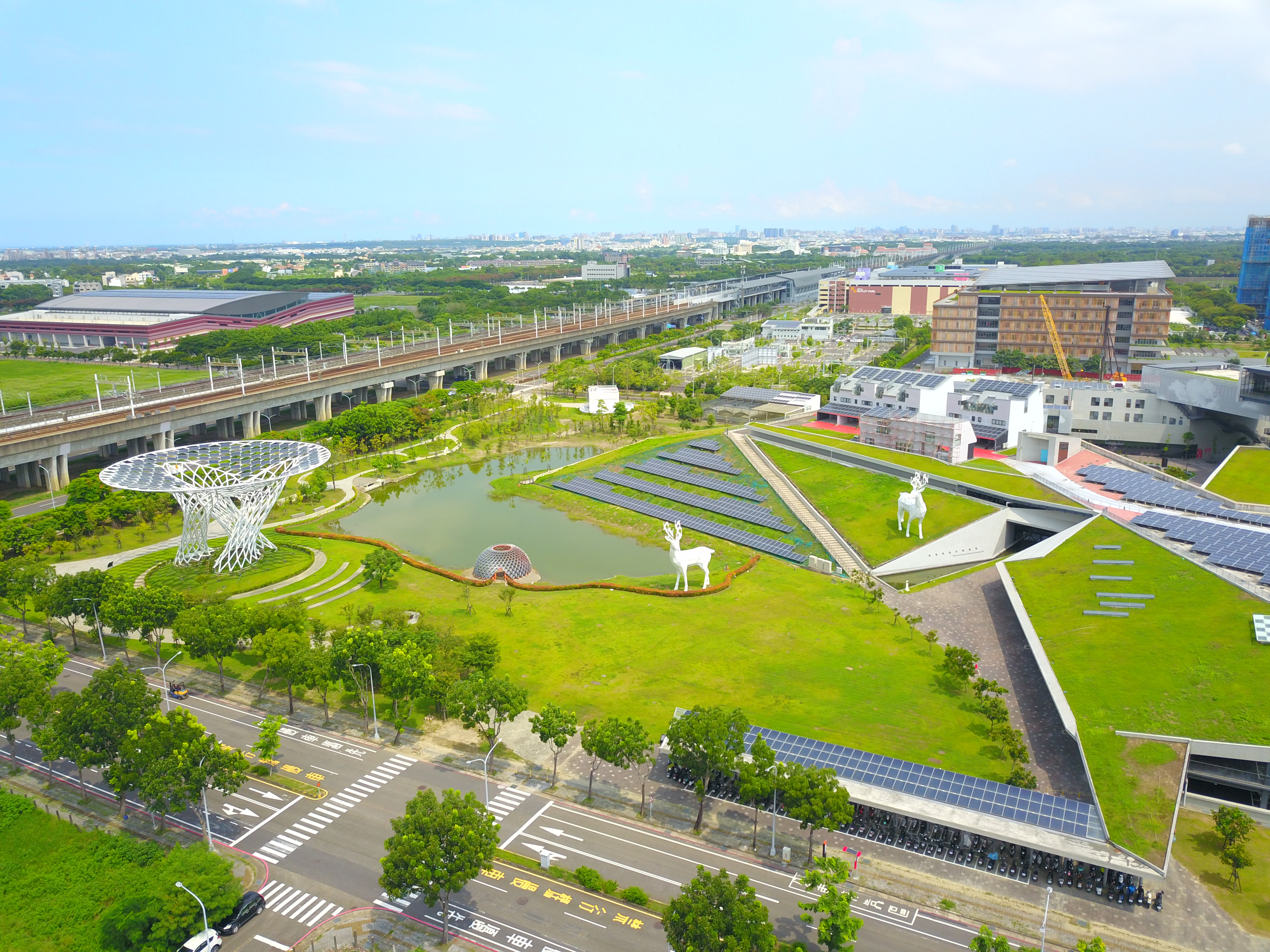

- Location within Tainan
- Location: Gueiren, Tainan, Taiwan
- Coordinates: 22°55′43.8″N 120°17′39.8″E
- Opening date: 30 March 2018
- Manager: Huang Der-ray (Director-General); Yang Bing-chwen, Chen Jiann-fuh (Deputy Director-Generals)
- Website: Official website

The Shalun Smart Green Energy Science City (traditional Chinese: 沙崙智慧綠能科學城; simplified Chinese: 沙仑智慧绿能科学城; pinyin: Shālún Zhìhuì Lǜnéng Kēxuéchéng) is an industrial park in Gueiren District, Tainan, Taiwan.

== History ==
The development of the industrial park started on 27 October 2016 after the Executive Yuan approved the plan. On 6 November the same year, the Shalun Smart Green Energy Science City office was established. The groundbreaking ceremony for the industrial park construction was held on 30 March 2018 in a ceremony attended by Premier William Lai.

== Tenants ==
- ICC Tainan convention center
- Academia Sinica South Campus
- Mitsui Outlet Park Tainan
- NSTC Cybersecurity & Smart Technology R&D Building
- Shalun Green Energy Technology Demonstration Site

== Transportation ==
The industrial park is accessible within walking distance from Tainan Station of Taiwan High Speed Rail and Shalun railway station.

== See also ==
- Southern Taiwan Semiconductor Corridor
