= Renshou Temple =

Buddhist temple in Foshan, China

- 仁寿寺
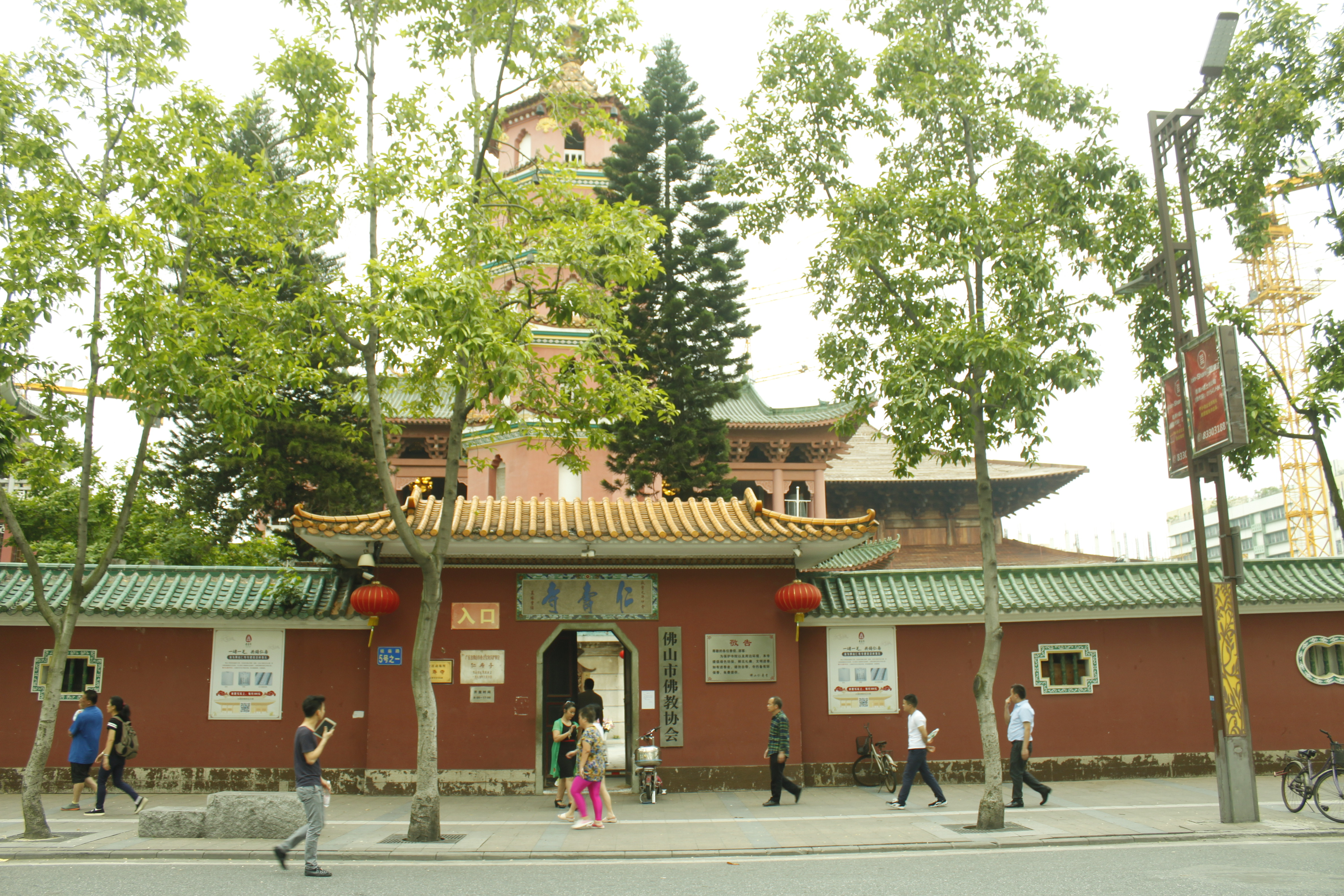
- Entrance of Renshou Temple.

- Location within Guangdong Location within China

Religion
- Affiliation: Buddhism
- Sect: Chan Buddhism
- District: Chancheng District
- Prefecture: Foshan
- Province: Guangdong

Location
- Country: China
- Interactive map of Renshou Temple
- Prefecture: Foshan
- Coordinates: 23°02′21″N 113°07′11″E

Architecture
- Founder: Master Zongtang
- Established: 1656

Renshou Temple (simplified Chinese: 仁寿寺; traditional Chinese: 仁壽寺; pinyin: Rénshòu Sì) is a Buddhist temple situated in downtown Foshan, Guangdong, China.

== History ==
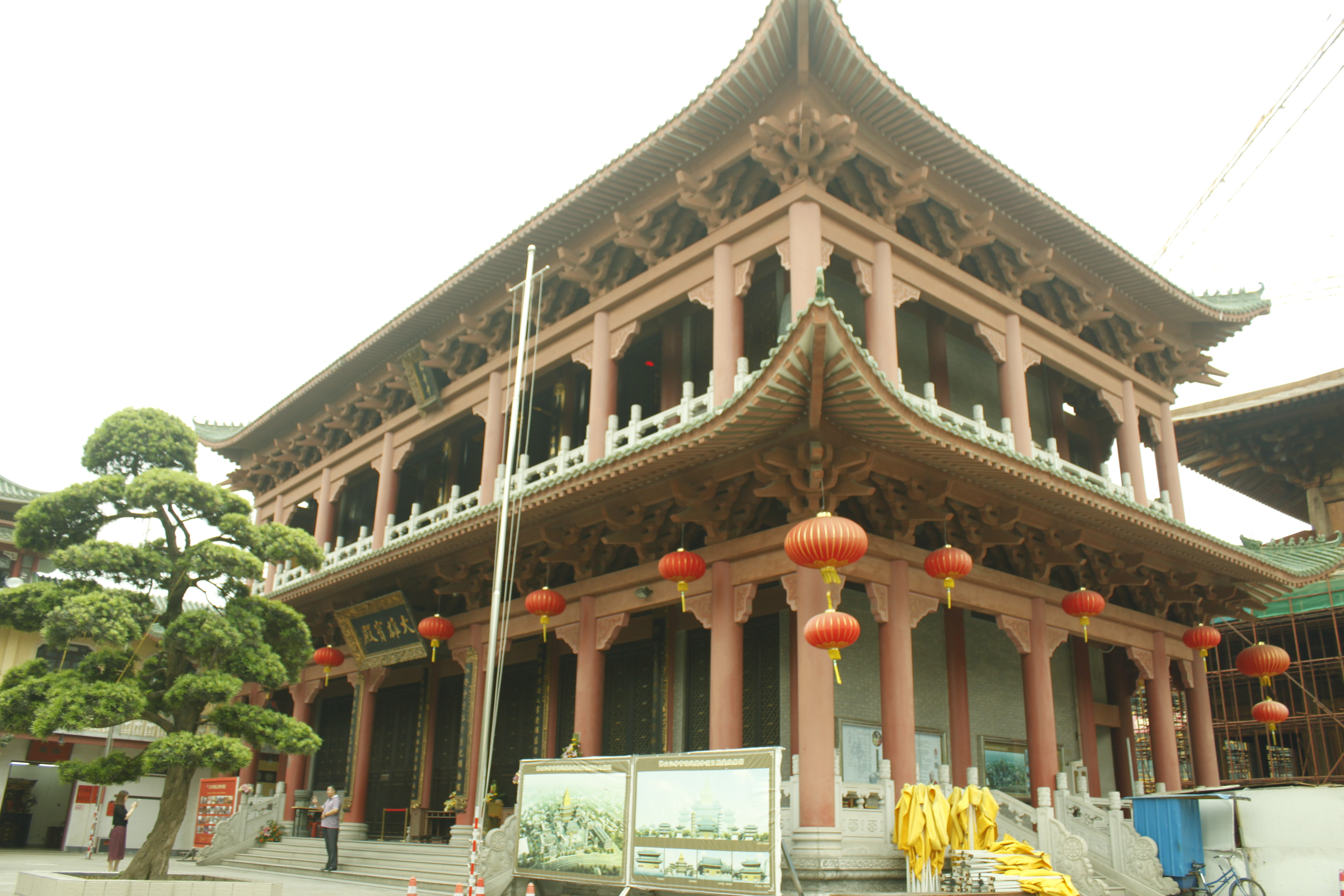
The Mahavira Hall at Renshou Temple.

Renshou Temple was first built in the 13th year of Period Shunzhi (1656) in the Qing dynasty (1646–1911) by Chan master Zongtang (Chinese: 纵堂). In the 8th year of the age of Kangxi of Kangxi Emperor, namely AD 1669, monk Yulin (Chinese: 玉琳) rebuilt the shanmen. In the 1st year of Period Xianfeng (1851), monk Renji (Chinese: 仁机) rebuilt the temple.

In 1935, Li Peixian (Chinese: 李佩弦), a Chinese Tantric monk, donated property to establish the Ruyi Pagoda (Chinese: 如意宝塔), whose canonization ceremony was held by Venerable Master Hsu Yun in 1938.

In 1952, it was taken as a granary by the newly founded Communist government. After the Cultural Revolution in 1982, Xu Yeping (Chinese: 许业萍) and other lay Buddhists donated money to rebuild the temple. Shi Dashan (Chinese: 释达善) was invited to serve as its abbot. On June 29, 1998, Renshou temple was officially opened to the public.

== Architecture ==
Now the existing main buildings include the Shanmen, the Mahavira Hall and the Ruyi Pagoda. Ruyi Pagoda is a seven story octagonal pagoda which was inlaid with Tibetan tablets and plaques. There are more than ten porcelain Buddha statues inside the pagoda.

== List of abbot ==
- Zongtang (Chinese: 纵堂)
- Yulin (Chinese: 玉琳)
- Zhiyuan (Chinese: 祗园)
- Ciyun (Chinese: 慈云)
- Shi Dashan (Chinese: 释达善)
- Shi Mingsheng (Chinese: 释明生)
