= Gueiren District =

District in Tainan, Taiwan

Gueiren 歸仁區 Guiren, Kueijen
- District
- Gueiren
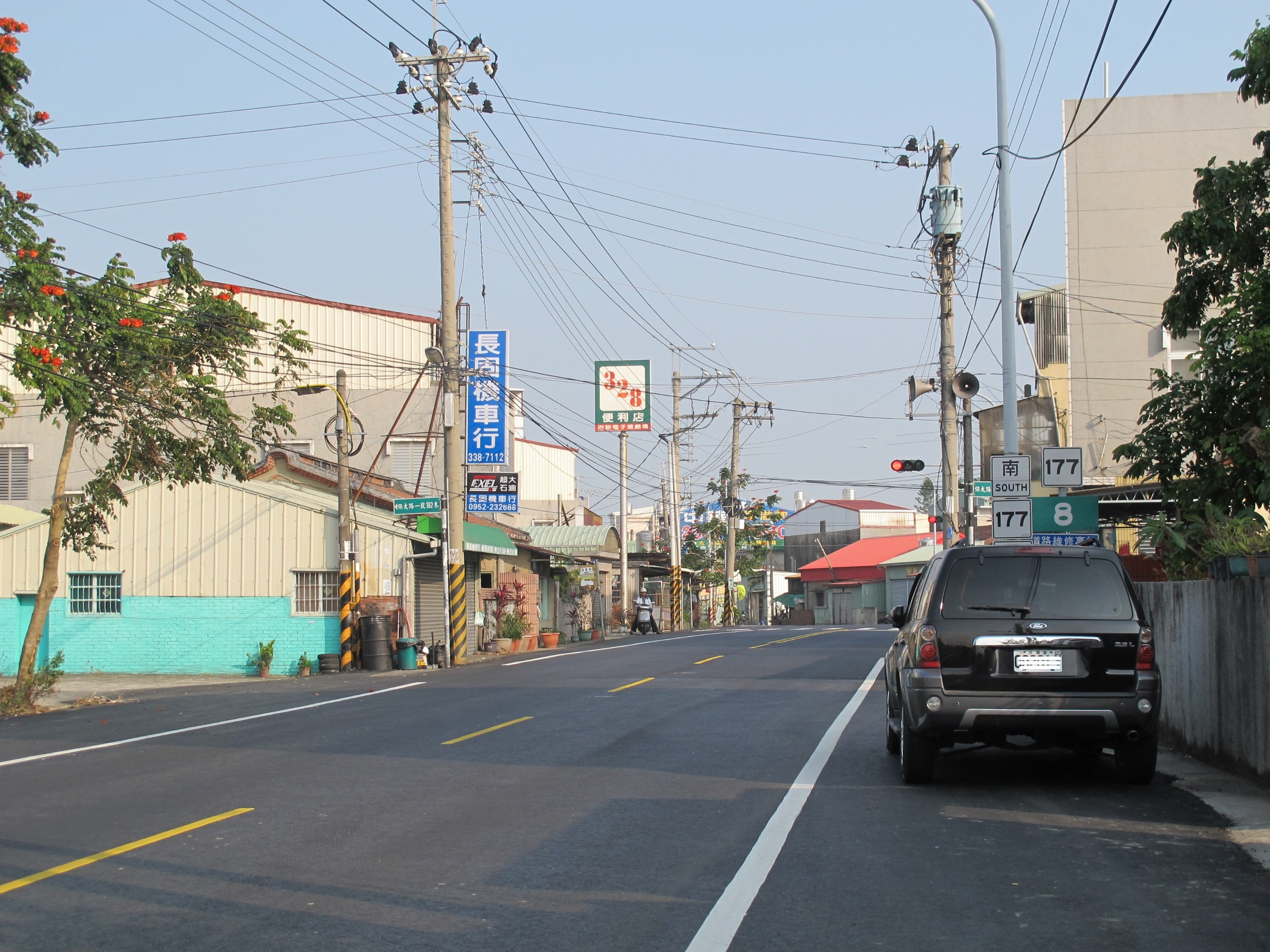

- 臺南市歸仁區公所; Gueiren District Office, Tainan City

- Gueiren District in Tainan City
- Coordinates: 22°58′N 120°17′E
- Country: Taiwan
- Special municipality: Tainan
- Gueiren Village: 1920

Government
  - District Chief: Chen Ying-yu (陳英裕)

Area
  - Total: 55.7913 km^{2} (21.5411 sq mi)

Population (May 2022)
  - Total: 67,924
  - Density: 1,217.5/km^{2} (3,153.2/sq mi)
- Time zone: UTC+8 (CST)
- ZIP code: 711
- Website: gueiren.tainan.gov.tw/en (in English)

Gueiren District (Chinese: 歸仁區; Hanyu Pinyin: Guīrén Qū; Tongyong Pinyin: Gueirén Cyu; Wade–Giles: Kui^{1}-jen^{2} Ch'ü^{1}; Pe̍h-ōe-jī: Kui-jîn-khu) is a rural district in southern Tainan, Taiwan. It is home to the Tainan HSR station.

== History ==
After the handover of Taiwan from Japan to the Republic of China in 1945, Rende was organized as a rural township of Tainan County. On 25 December 2010, Tainan County was merged with Tainan City and Rende was upgraded to a district of the city.

== Administrative divisions ==
The district consists of Nanbao, Liujia, Guiren, Houshi, Gucuo, Xucuo, Kanxi, Kantung, Lunding, Shalun, Datan, Wutung, Bajia, Qijia, Mamiao, Xipu, Damiao, Nanxing, Xincuo, Guinan and Wenhua Village.

== Economy ==
The local economy is based mainly on agriculture, including sugar-apples, peanuts, starfruit and guavas. It also houses the Shalun Smart Green Energy Science City.

== Education ==
- National Yang Ming Chiao Tung University
- Chang Jung Christian University
- National Hsin-Feng Senior High School

== Tourist attractions ==
- Gueiren Excellencies Temple
- Guiren Living Art Center
- Lobster Pool
- Renshou Temple
- Temple of Confucius
- World Snake Educational Farm
- ICC Tainan convention center

== Transportation ==
- Tainan HSR station - can transfer to Shalun railway station
- Chang Jung Christian University railway station

== Notable natives ==
- Lee Ming-liang, Minister of Department of Health (2000–2002)
