= Tainan HSR station =

Railway station in Tainan, Taiwan

Tainan 台南
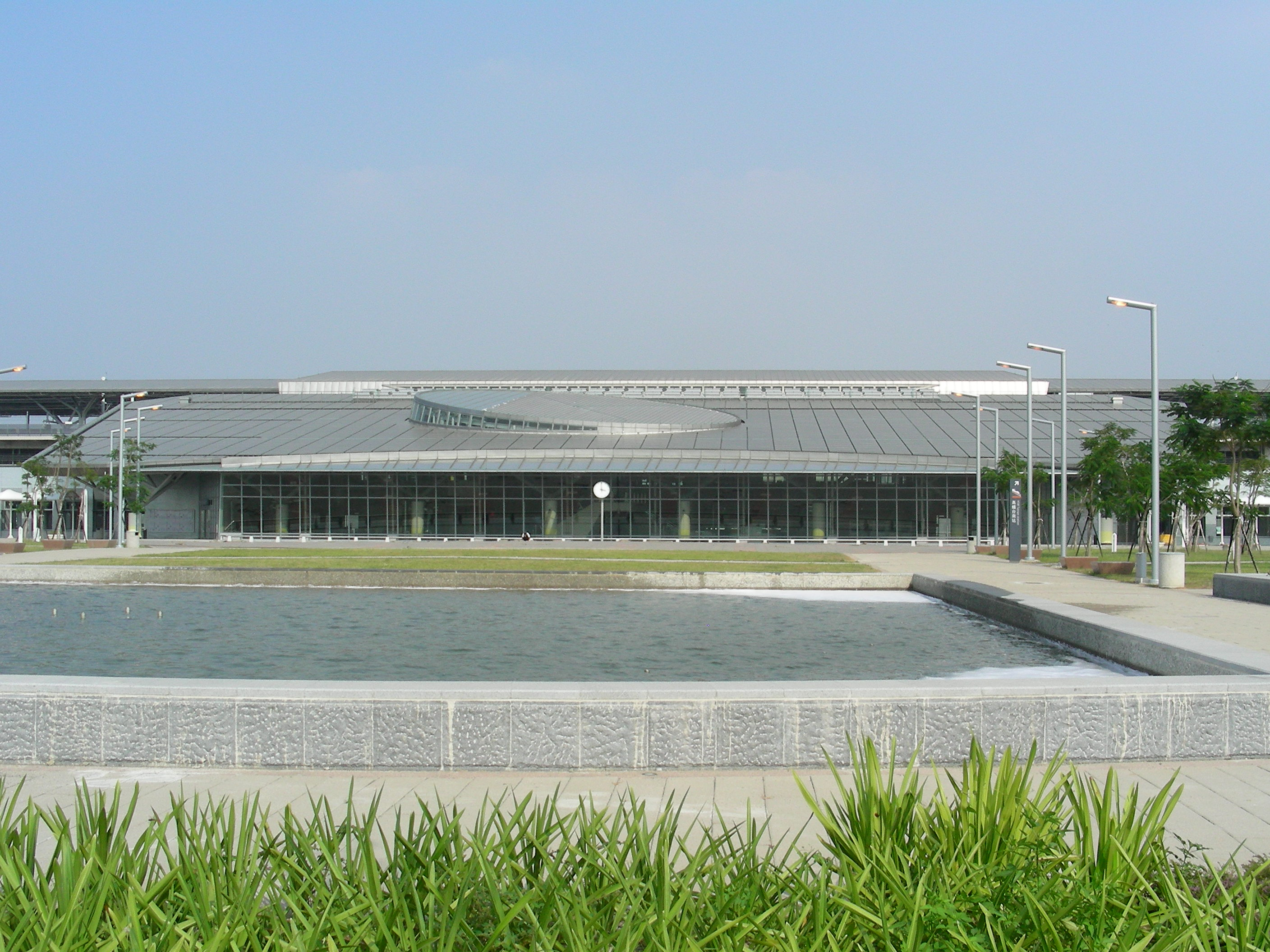
- Station exterior

Chinese name
- Traditional Chinese: 台南
Transcriptions
Standard Mandarin
- Hanyu Pinyin: Táinán
- Bopomofo: ㄊㄞˊ ㄋㄢˊ
Hakka
- Romanization: Tǒi-nǎm (Sixian dialect); Toi-nam (Hailu dialect)
Southern Min
- Tâi-lô: Tâi-lâm

General information
- Location: 100 Guiren Blvd; Gueiren District, Tainan; Taiwan
- Coordinates: 22.9246°N 120.2857°E
- System: THSR railway station
- Line: THSR
- Distance: 313.7 km
- Connections: Conventional rail; Coach

Construction
- Structure type: Elevated
- Architect: Fei & Cheng Associates

Other information
- Station code: TAN／11
- Website: www.thsrc.com.tw/en/StationInfo/Prospect/84221373-8943-4a42-8707-bbd38f022138

History
- Opened: 5 January 2007; 19 years ago

Passengers
- 2018: 8.321 million per year ▲5.1%
- Rank: 6 out of 12

Services
Preceding station	Taiwan High Speed Rail	Following station
Chiayi towards Nangang	THSR	Zuoying Terminus
Location
- Location within Taiwan

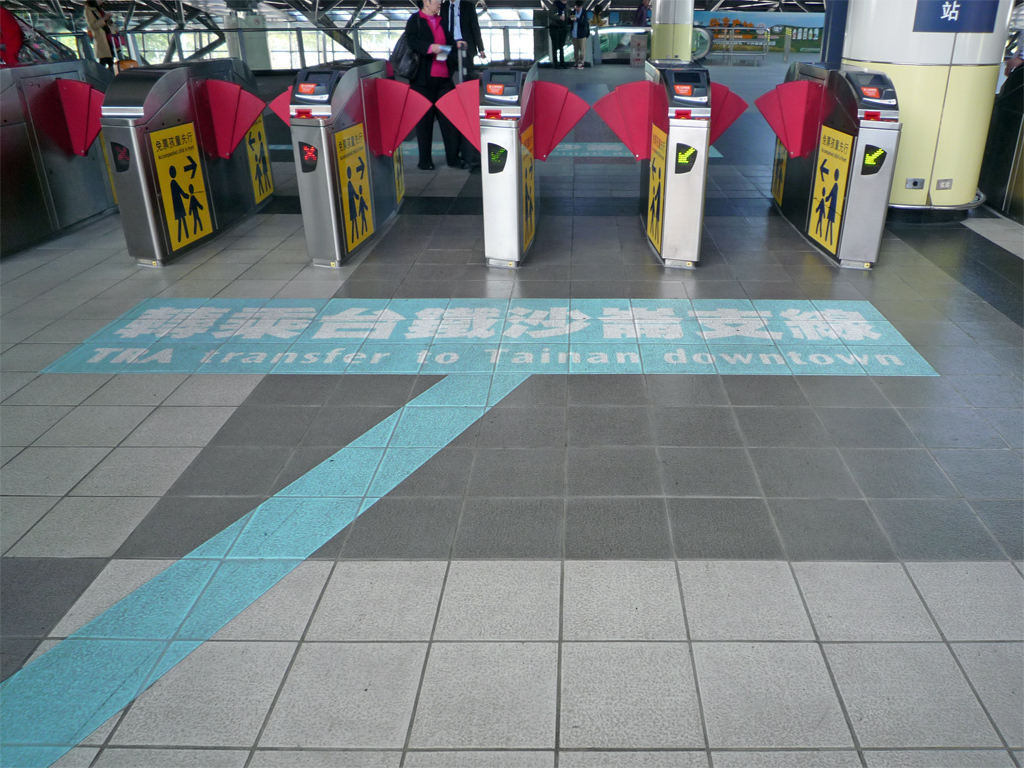
Direction sign of TRA platform which is behind ticket barrier in THSR Tainan station

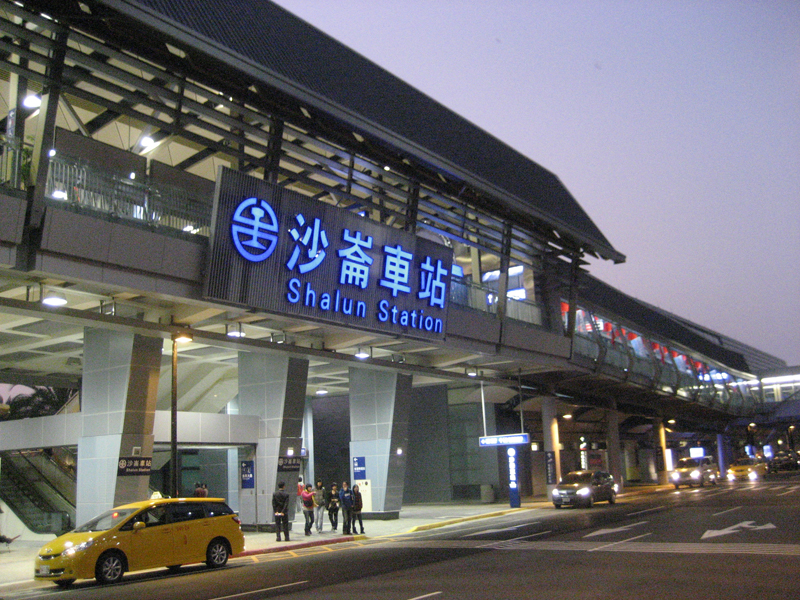
THSR Tainan station is connected by skywalk to TRA Shalun station.

Tainan (Chinese: 台南; pinyin: Táinán) is a railway station in Tainan, Taiwan served by Taiwan High Speed Rail, and is connected to Shalun station for TRA services. It is near the border between Kaohsiung City and Tainan City. Tainan HSR station is about 17 km from Tainan railway station.

== Overview ==
Tainan Station, part of the Taiwan High Speed Rail (THSR) network, was designed by Mark & Sean Associates and constructed primarily by the Shimizu Corporation. The station features an elevated structure with two side platforms and a total floor area of 28,708 square meters (309,010 square feet). It is built using steel and reinforced concrete.

The architectural design includes a horizontally connected roof between the station building and the platforms. A distinctive oval-shaped skylight is positioned at the center of the station hall, allowing natural light to illuminate the interior space.

=== History ===
3 November 2006: Tainan station officially opened for service.

5 January 2007: The THSR segment between Banqiao and Zuoying commenced operations, with trains beginning to stop at Tainan station.

=== Platform layout ===
4	2A	■ Taiwan High Speed Rail (southbound)	Toward Zuoying
3; 2		■ Taiwan High Speed Rail (passing tracks)
1	1A	■ Taiwan High Speed Rail (northbound)	Toward Chiayi, Taichung, Taoyuan, Taipei

== Station layout ==
3F
3F	Side platform
3F	Platform 2	THSR toward Zuoying (terminus)
3F	Passing track	THSR through service
3F	Passing track	THSR through service
3F	Platform 1	THSR toward Nangang (Chiayi)
3F	Side platform

2F
Connecting level
Ticketing gates, waiting area, infant care room

The skywalk connects THSR station with TRA Shalun station.

Ground level	Lobby	Entrance/exit, ticketing, automatic ticketing machines, restrooms, information desk Parking lot, transfer station, taxi stand, drop-off area

== Shuttle bus ==
The station has a bus stop located near Exit 2.

- Bus route:
  - 【32】 HSR Tainan Station ─ The Indigenous Culture Museum
  - 【62】 HSR Tainan Station ─ Chimei Medical Center
  - 【H31】 HSR Tainan Station ─ Tainan City Hall
  - 【G16】 HSR Tainan Station ─ Guanmiao Junior High School ─ Guanmiao Bus Station ─ Sinhun Bus Station
  - 【R3】 Guanmiao Bus Station ─ HSR Tainan Station ─ Tainan Airport ─ TRA Tainan Station ─ Tainan Bus Station
  - 【R14】 Chang Jung Christian University ─ HSR Tainan Station ─ Downtown Gueiren ─ Guanmiao Bus Station

== HSR services ==
HSR services (1)2xx, (1)3xx, 583, 598, (1)6xx, and (8)8xx call at this station.

== Oiran Train Scenic Park ==
On December 22, 2023, the Taiwan High Speed Rail Corporation opened the Oiran Train Scenic Park at the Tainan HSR Station. It features the 0 series "Oiran" train car that was originally transported from Japan for surveying and track testing during the construction of Taiwan's high speed rail.

The train is one of two 0 series trains located outside of Japan, and was a gift from the West Japan Railway Company. After its service from 2004 to 2006, the train was stored at the HSR Liujia Depot in Hsinchu. Restoration of the car by the Taiwan High Speed Rail Museum began in 2017 and completed in 2019.

== Around the station ==
- Provincial Highway No. 86
- Mitsui Outlet Park Tainan
- National Cheng Kung University Aviation Space and Technology Research Center
- National Yang Ming Chiao Tung University, Tainan campus
- Chang Jung Christian University
- Shalun Smart Green Energy Science City
- ICC Tainan convention center
- Taiwan Tainan Detention Center

== Image gallery ==
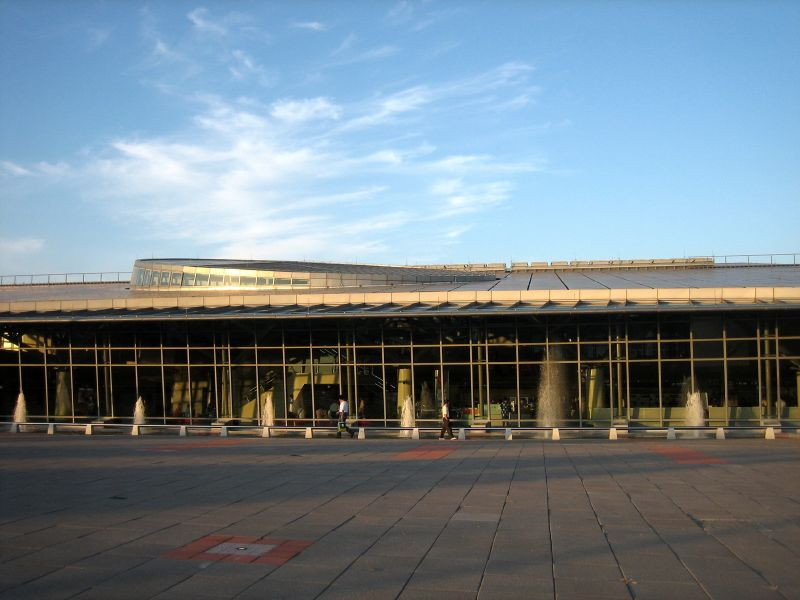
THSR Tainan station exterior

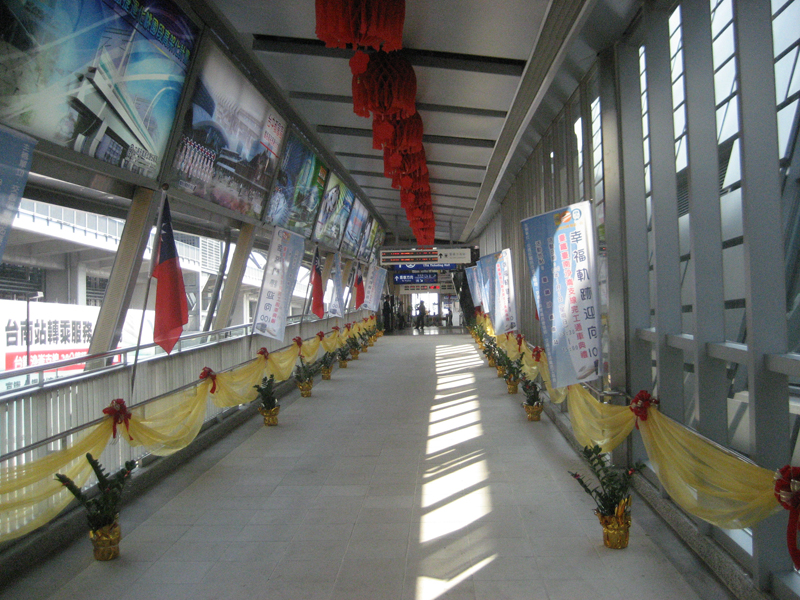
An inside view of the skyway to Shalun station

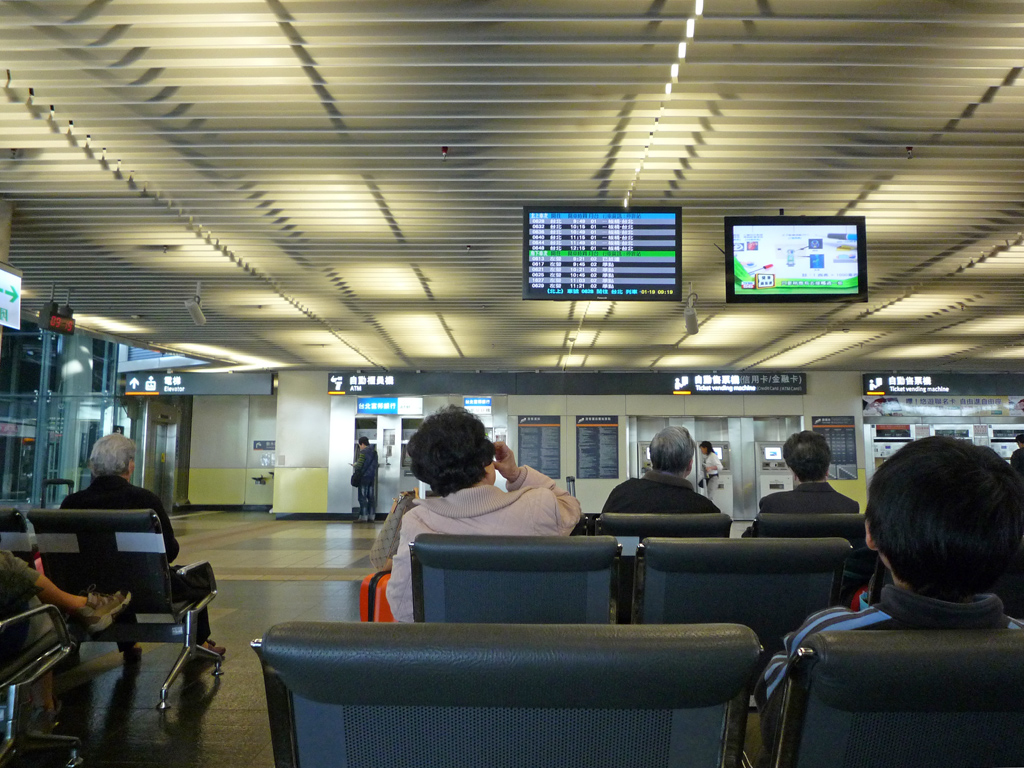
The Waiting area of THSR Tainan station

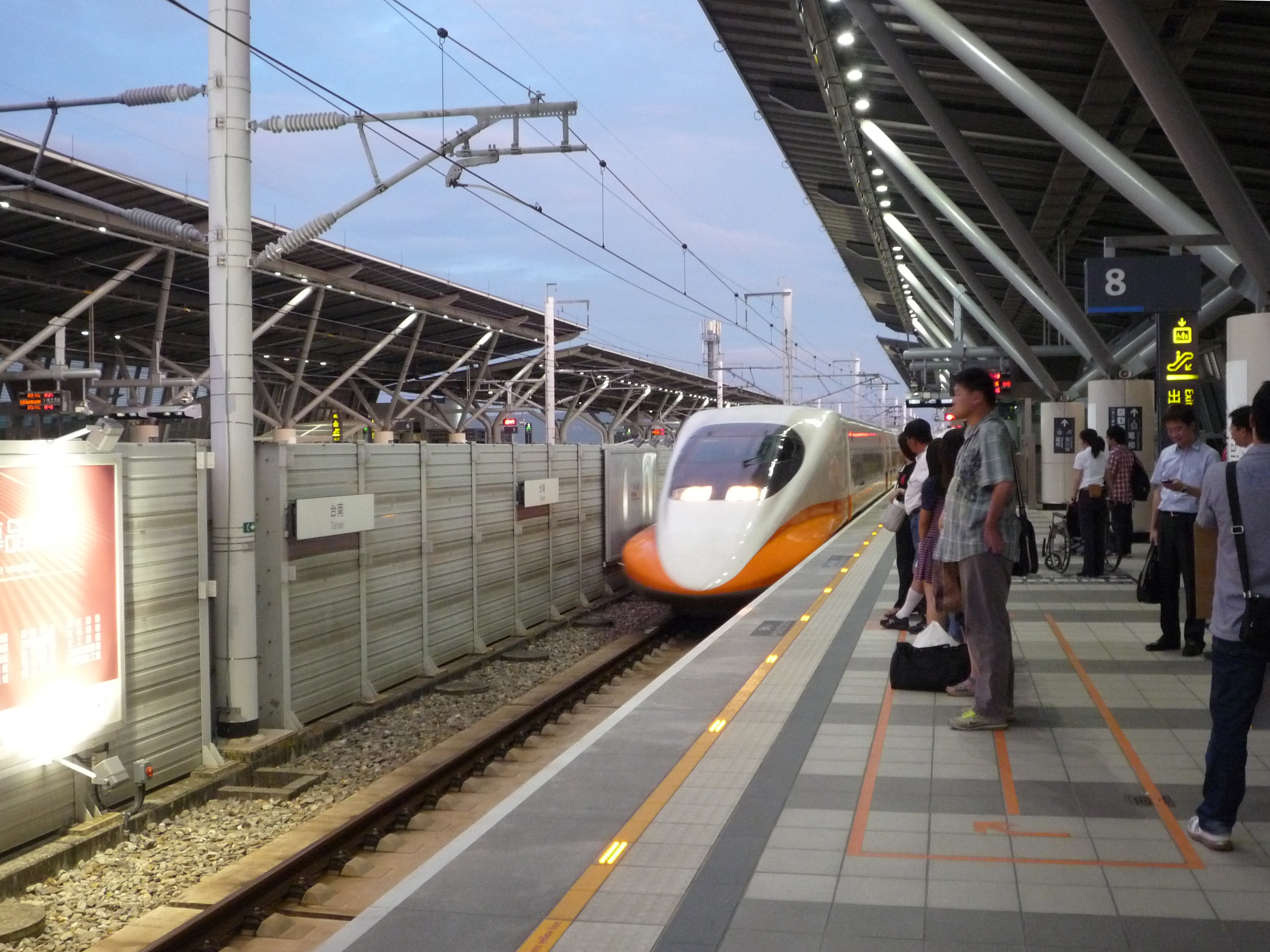
A northbound train approaching Tainan station

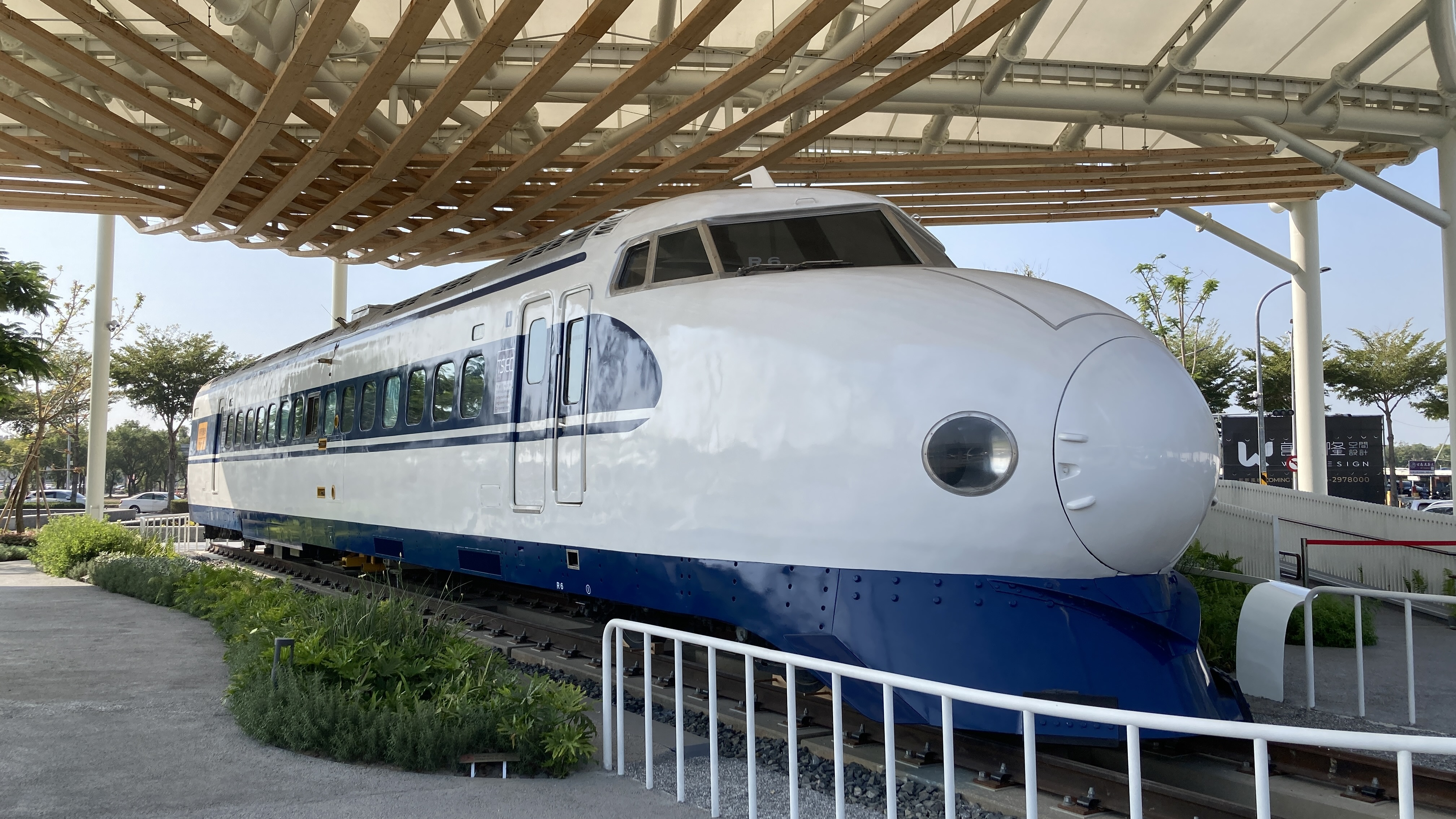
0 series train on display at Oiran Train Scenic Park at Tainan HSR station

== Sources ==
- Dynamic Bus Information System of Tainan
- The routes of THSR shuttle bus (Chinese)
