= Zhongzhou railway station =

Railway station in Tainan, Taiwan

Zhongzhou 中洲
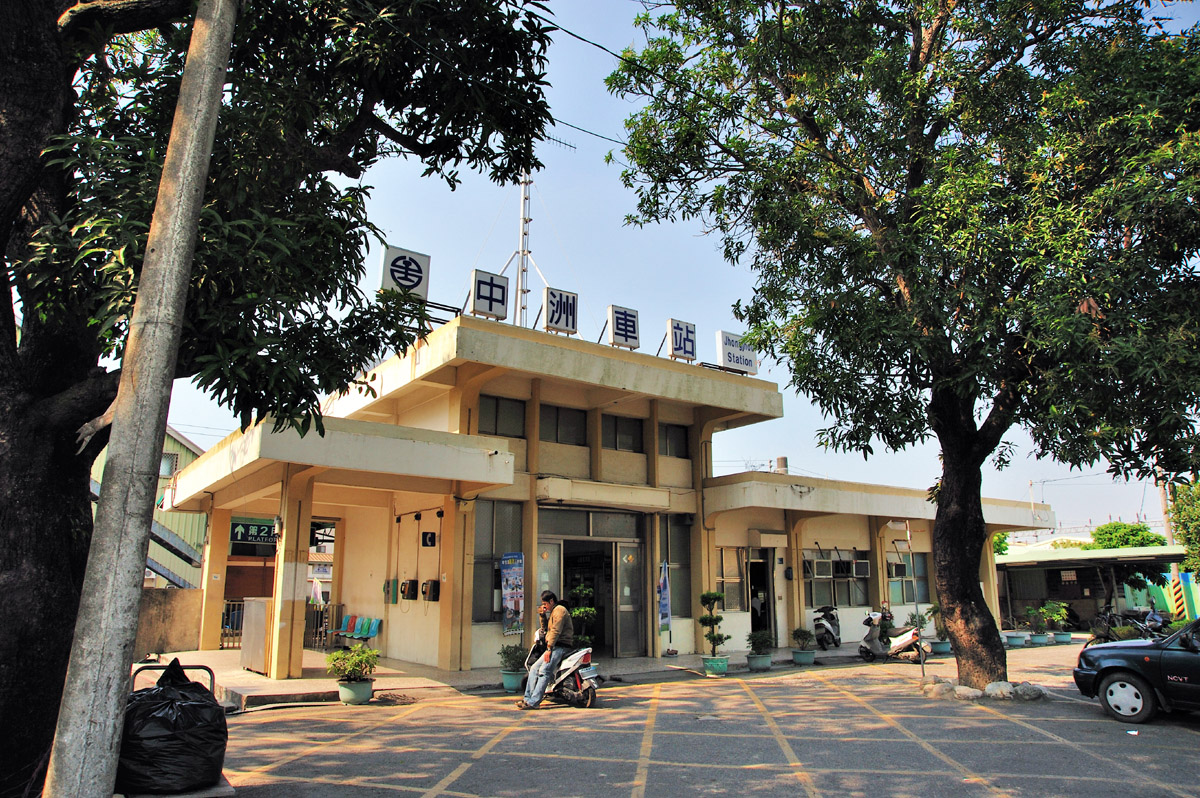

General information
- Location: Rende, Tainan, Taiwan
- Coordinates: 22°54′17″N 120°15′09″E
- Operated by: Taiwan Railway Corporation
- Lines: Western Trunk line (177); Shalun line (177)
- Distance: 364.8 km from Keelung

Construction
- Structure type: Elevated

Other information
- Station code: 177
- Classification: 二等站 (Taiwan Railways Administration level)

History
- Opened: 11 December 1901
Location

Zhongzhou (Chinese: 中洲車站; pinyin: Zhōngzhōu chēzhàn) is a railway station on Taiwan Railway Western Trunk line in Rende District, Tainan, Taiwan. Similar to other stations on the line, it is equipped with multiple card-reading machines.

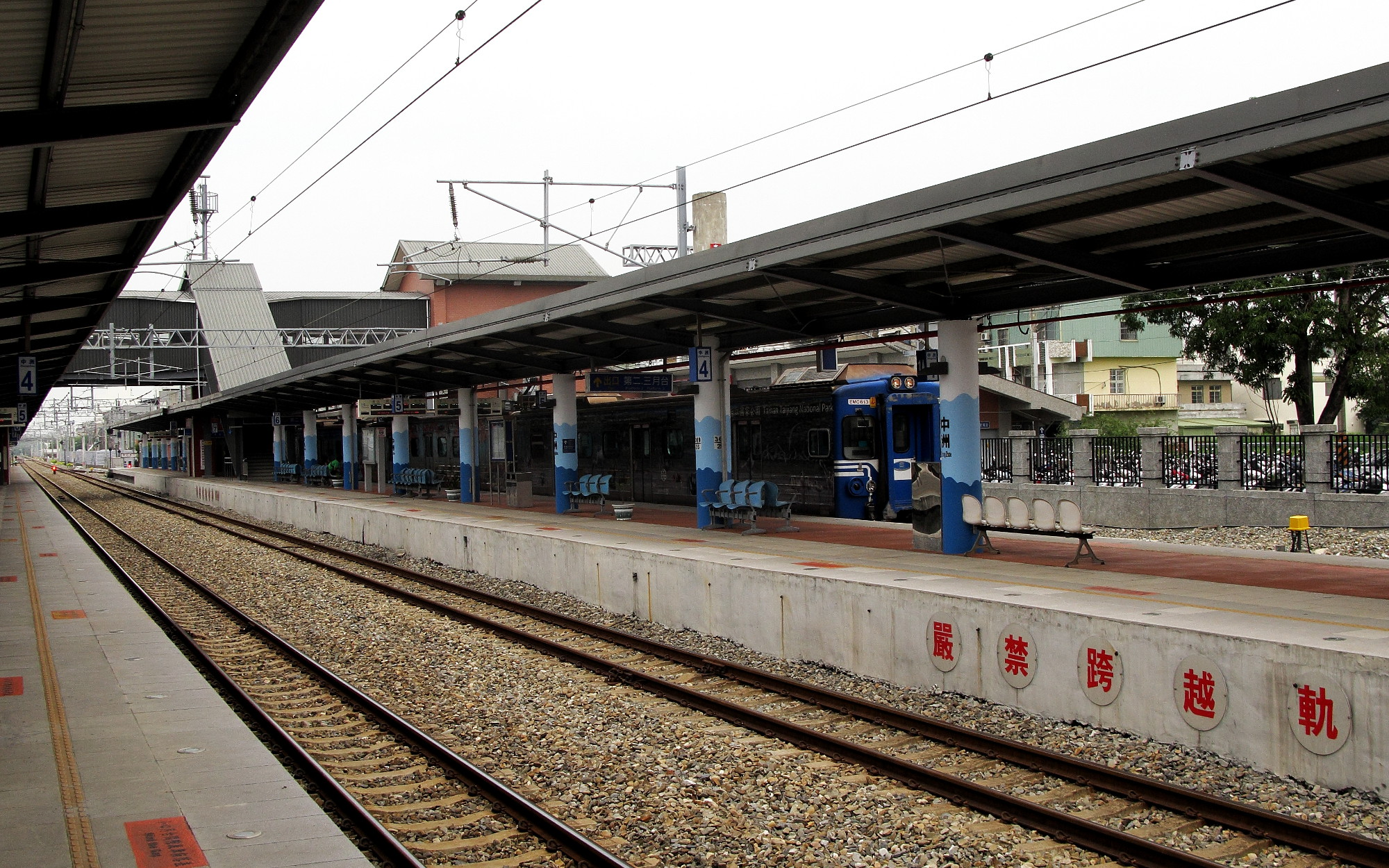
Zhongzhou station platform

== See also ==
- List of railway stations in Taiwan

Preceding station	Taiwan Railway	Following station
Rende towards Keelung	Western Trunk line	Dahu towards Pingtung
Terminus	Shalun line	Chang Jung Christian University towards Shalun
