= Chang Jung Christian University =

University in Gueiren, Tainan, Taiwan

Coordinates: 22°54′9.8″N 120°16′21.1″E

- 長榮大學
- Type: Private
- Established: 1993
- Affiliations: Association of Christian Universities and Colleges in Asia, United Board for Christian Higher Education in Asia
- President: Yung-Lung Lee
- Administrative staff: 630
- Undergraduates: 8419
- Postgraduates: 600
- Location: Gueiren, Tainan, Taiwan
- Campus: Suburban Main Campus: 60 ha (146 acres)
- Website: cjcu.edu.tw

Chang Jung Christian University
- Traditional Chinese: 長榮大學
Transcriptions
Standard Mandarin
- Hanyu Pinyin: Zhǎngróng Dàxué
Southern Min
- Hokkien POJ: Tióng-êng Tāi-ha̍k

Chang Jung Christian University (CJCU; Chinese: 長榮大學; Pe̍h-ōe-jī: Tióng-êng Tāi-ha̍k) is a private Presbyterian research university in Gueiren, Tainan, Taiwan. Chang Jung means everlasting glory in Mandarin.

== History ==
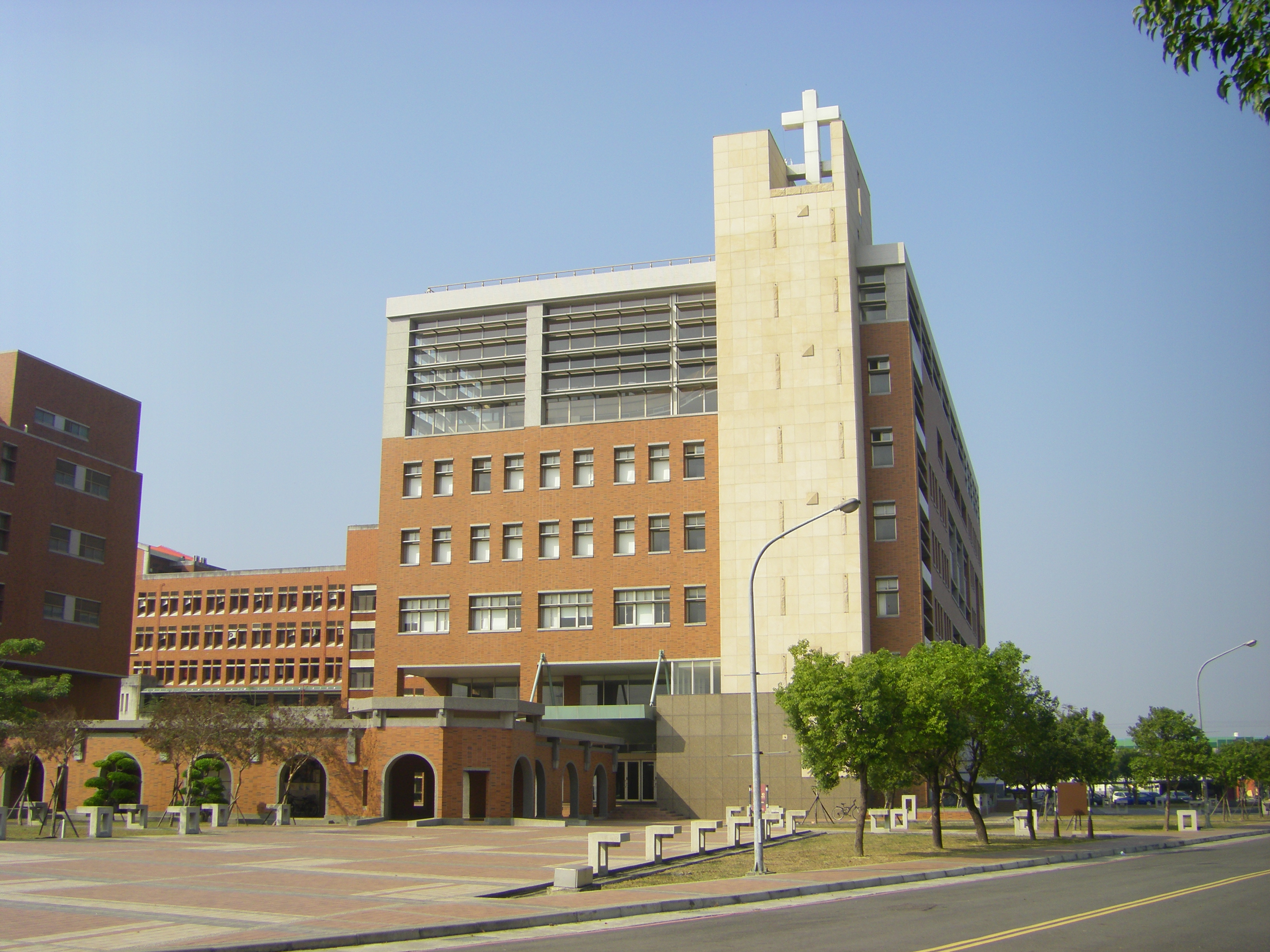
Chang Jung Christian University's Administration Building

The university was founded in 1993. The institution can trace its history to the Chang Jung Senior High School, which was founded in 1883. Edward Band, who taught at the school from the 1910s to 1940, was credited with introducing association football to Taiwan.

== Academic profile ==
Chang Jung Christian University (CJCU) is a private university located in southern Taiwan. it is associated with the Presbyterian church.

There are currently 54 bachelors programs, 17 masters programs, and 1 doctoral program.

== Organization ==
A president heads the university, which is divided into the following colleges:

- College of Management
- College of Health Science
- College of Humanities and Social Sciences
- School of Information and Design
- School of Theology
- College of Continuing Education
- International College of Practice and Education for the Environment
- School of Safety and Health Sciences
- College of Fine Arts
- School of Liberal Arts Education

== See also ==
- List of universities in Taiwan
