= Shalun railway station =

Railway station in Tainan, Taiwan

Coordinates: 22°55′25″N 120°17′10″E

Shalun 沙崙
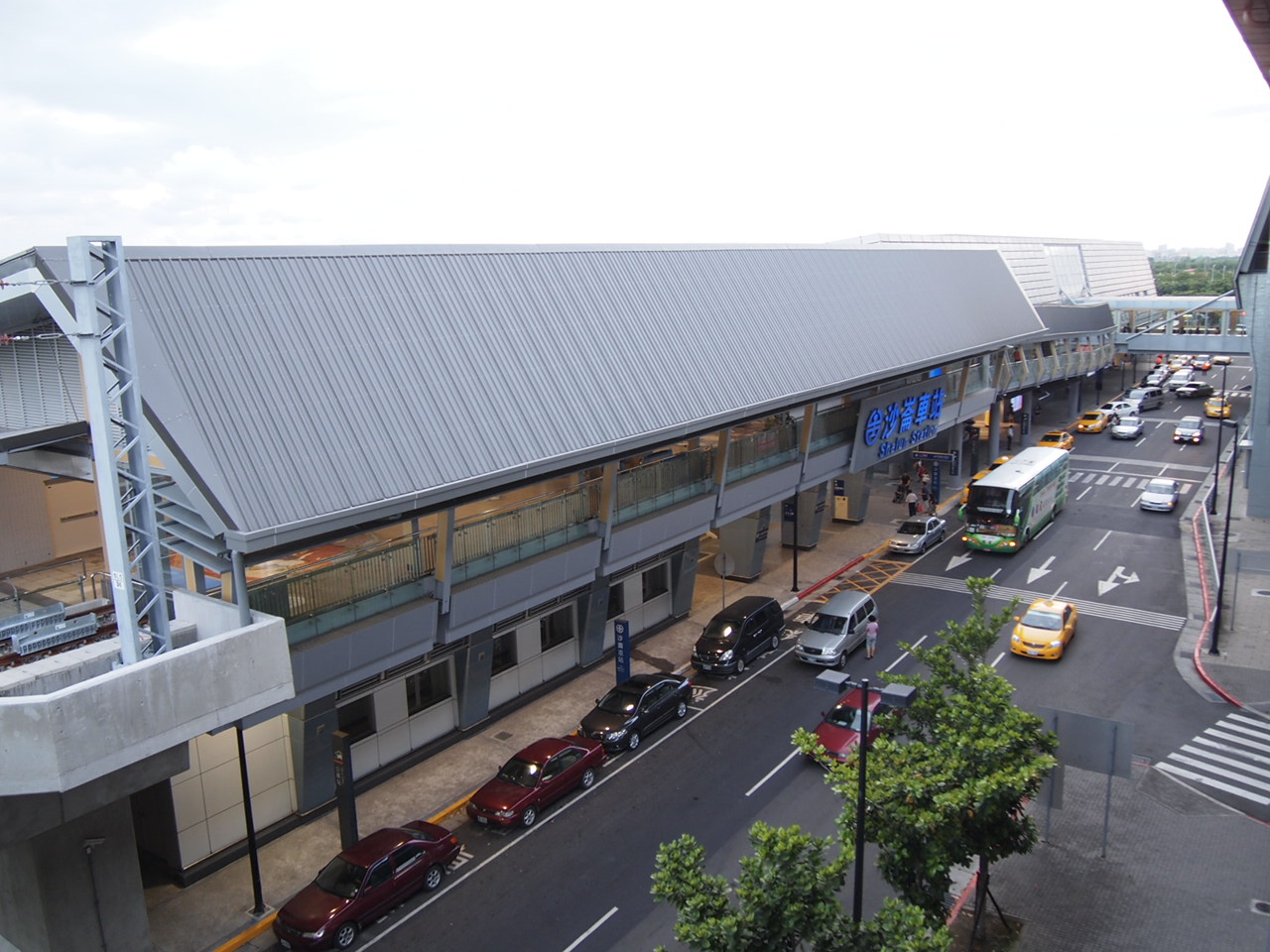

General information
- Location: Gueiren, Tainan; Taiwan
- Operated by: Taiwan Railway Corporation
- Lines: Shalun line (284); HSR (TNN Tainan)
- Distance: 5.3 km from Zhongzhou

Construction
- Structure type: Elevated

History
- Opened: 2 January 2011
Location

Shalun (Chinese: 沙崙車站; pinyin: Shālún chēzhàn; Pe̍h-ōe-jī: Soa-lūn chhia-thâu) is a railway station which opened on 2 January 2011. It is operated by the Taiwan Railway and is a terminal station on the Shalun line, located in Gueiren District, Tainan City, Taiwan. It connects to the THSR Tainan Station.

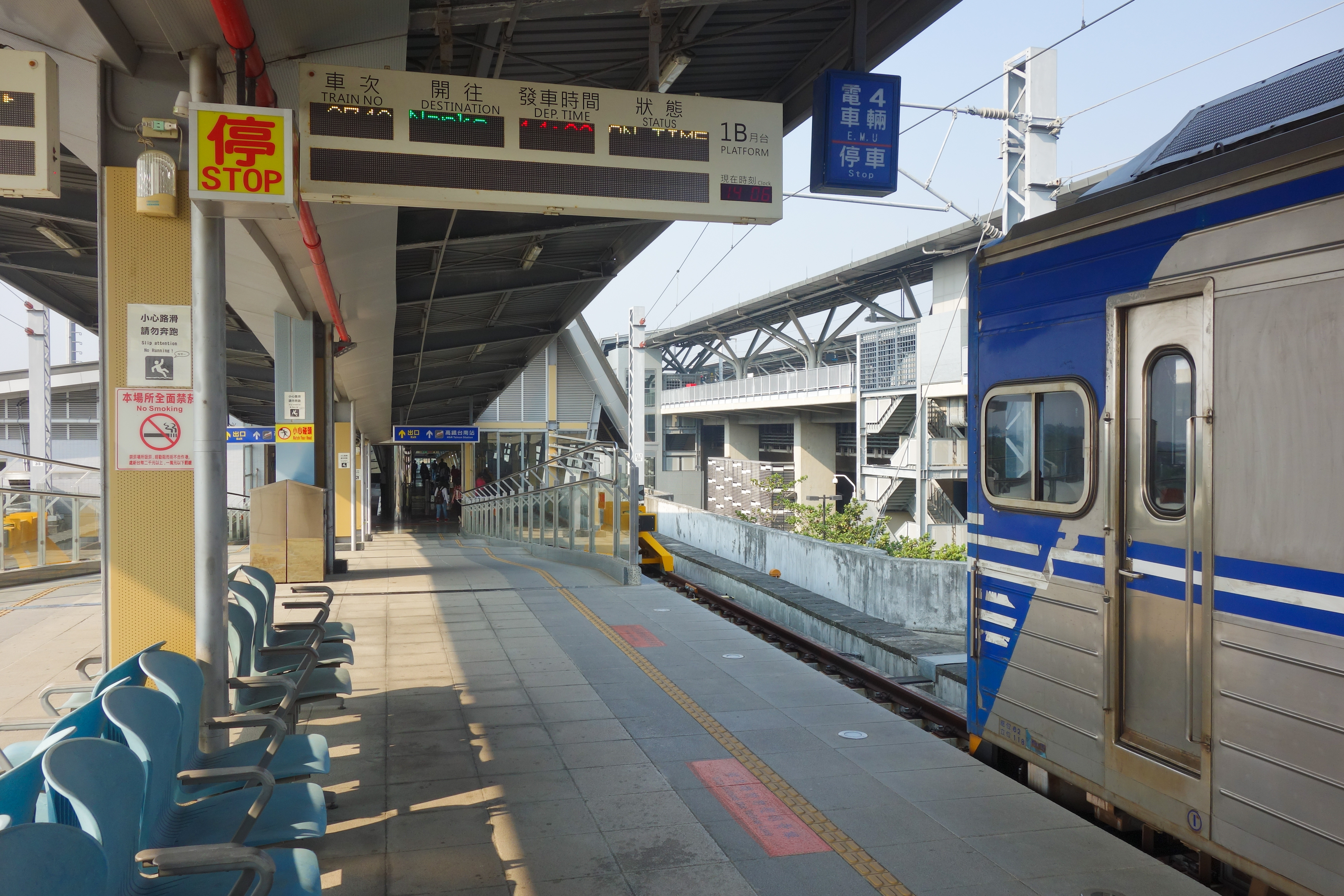
Shalun station platform

The departure time of the local train is about XX:00 and XX:30. It requires about 22 minutes and NT$25 from Shalun to Tainan Station. Similar to other stations on the line, it is equipped with multiple card-reading machines.

== Around the station ==
- Shalun Smart Green Energy Science City
- International Convention Centre Tainan
- Mitsui Outlet Park Tainan
- Tainan Prison

== See also ==
- List of railway stations in Taiwan

Preceding station	Taiwan Railway	Following station
Chang Jung Christian University towards Zhongzhou	Shalun line	Terminus
