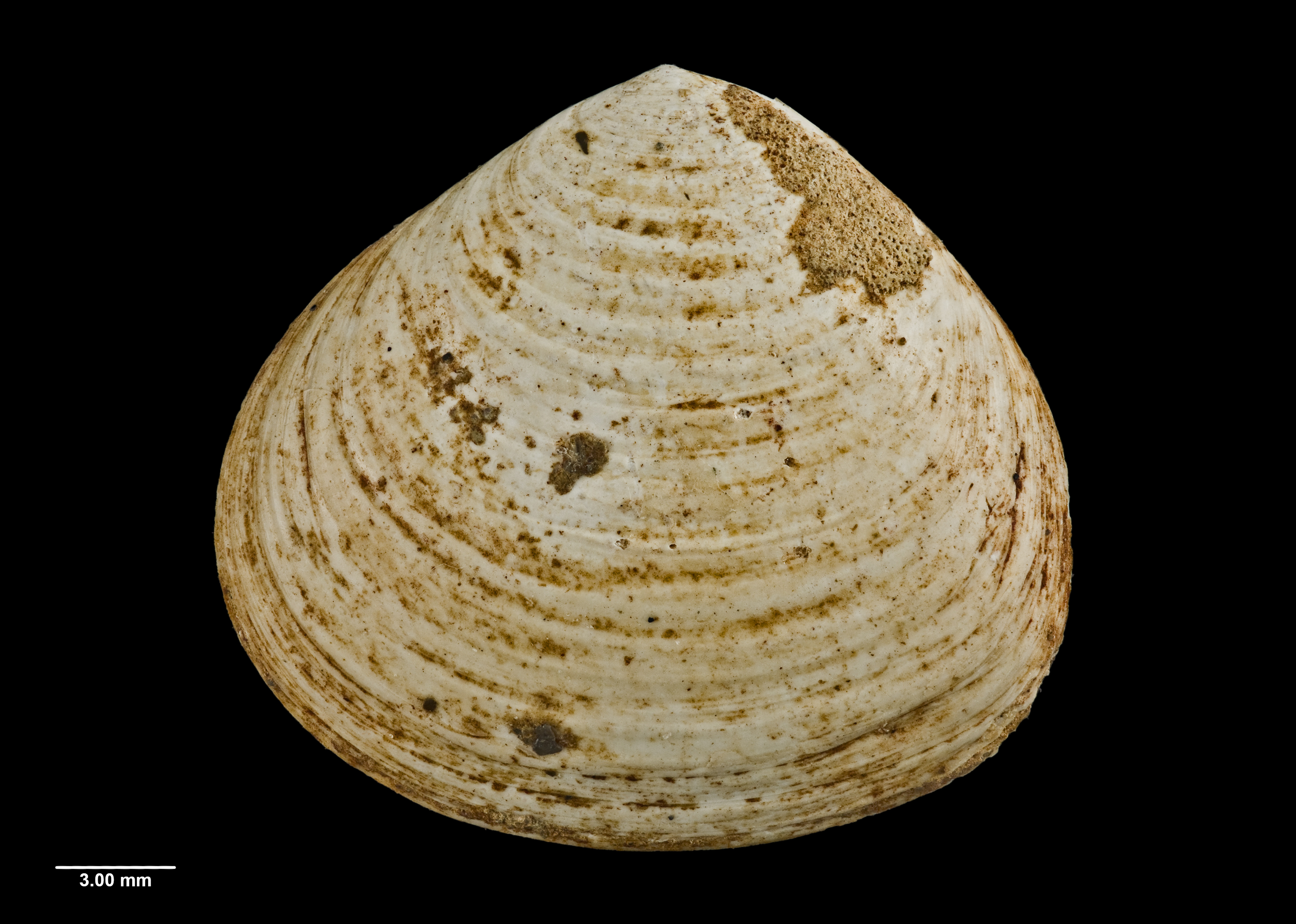
- Holotype from Auckland War Memorial Museum

Scientific classification
- Kingdom: Animalia
- Phylum: Mollusca
- Class: Bivalvia
- Order: Carditida
- Family: Crassatellidae
- Genus: Crassatina
- Species: C. nummaria

Binomial name
- Crassatina nummaria (A. W. B. Powell, 1931)

Synonyms
- Talabrica nummaria A. W. B. Powell, 1931

= Crassatina nummaria =

Crassatina nummaria Temporal range: 2.40 Ma

Species of bivalve

Crassatina nummaria is a species of bivalve, a marine mollusc in the family Crassatellidae. Fossils of the species date to the Nukumaruan stage (2.40 million years ago) of the Pleistocene in New Zealand.

== Description ==
In the original description, Powell described the species as follows:

Shell subcircular, massive, very little inflated; posterior end truncated and slightly shorter than anterior end. Beaks small. erect, contiguous. Sculpture of coarse, unevenly developed, concentric folds, diminishing in strength towards the sides, but nowhere flexed as in the Recent bellula. The folds are about one per millimetre and number about twenty-one for the entire having interspaces varying from approximately equal to a little greater than width of folds. Both anterior and posterior dorsal margins descend at about equal angles, but the posterior end is slightly shorter owing to a broad truncation. Hinge massive, but typical in its formation. Valve margin smooth.

The holotype of the species has a height of 20.5 mm (0.81 in), a length of 22.5 mm (0.89 in), and a thickness of 10.25 mm (0.404 in) for a both valves together.

== Taxonomy ==
The species was first described by A. W. B. Powell in 1931, using the name Talabrica nummaria. While the accepted name in New Zealand as of 2009 was Talabrica nummaria, the World Register of Marine Species lists the accepted name as Crassatina nummaria. The holotype was collected in January 1931 by Powell from Nukumaru Beach near Waiinu Beach in South Taranaki, and is held in the collections of Auckland War Memorial Museum.

== Ecology ==
Fossils of the species are found in association with Barytellina crassidens and Anomia trigonopsis.

== Distribution ==
This extinct marine species occurs in the Pleistocene Nukumaruan stage (2.40 million years ago) in New Zealand, including the Nukumaru Brown Sand. Fossils of the species have been found along the South Taranaki-northwestern Whanganui District coast, and near Pahiatua in Manawatū–Whanganui.

== Gallery ==
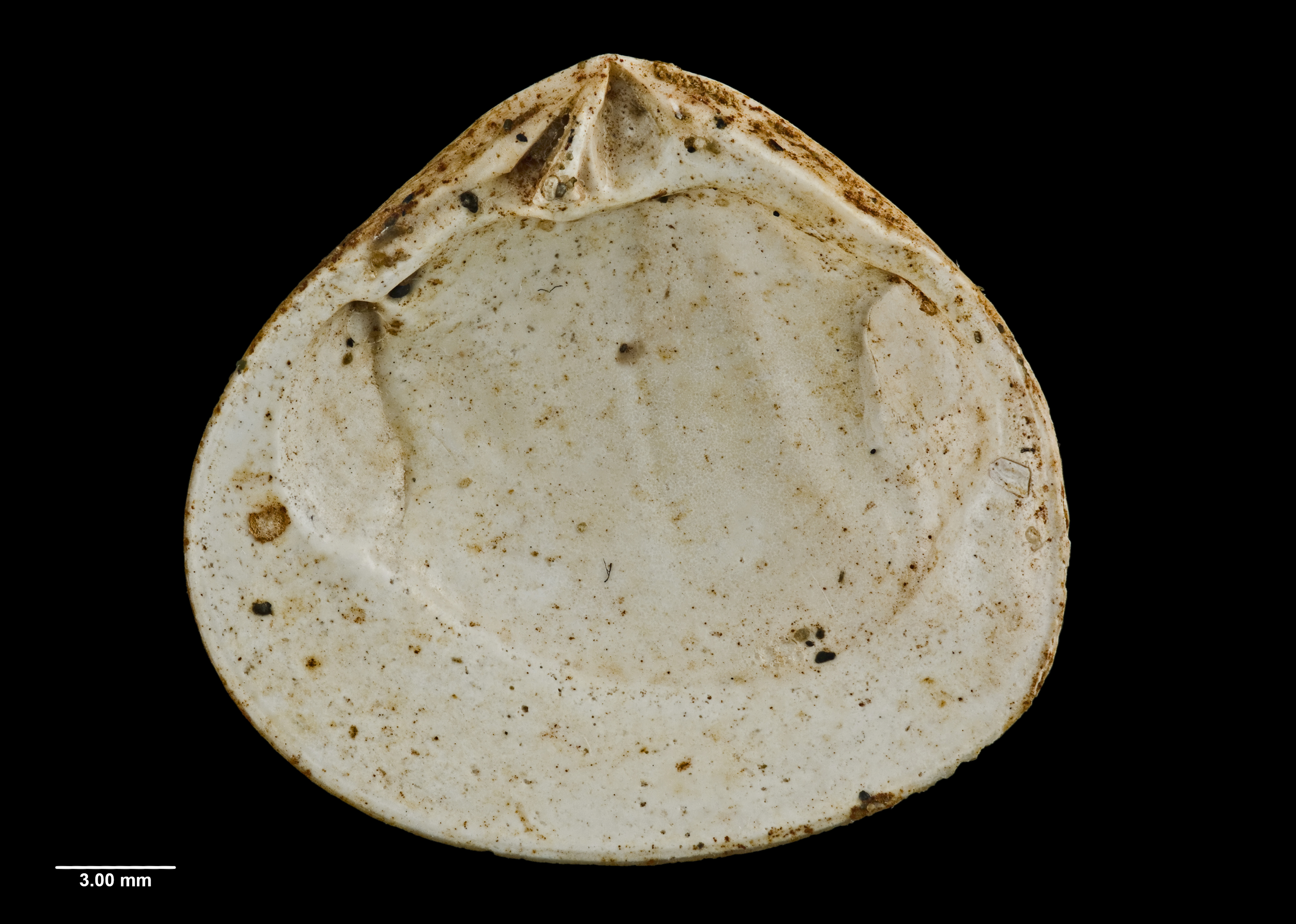
Underside view

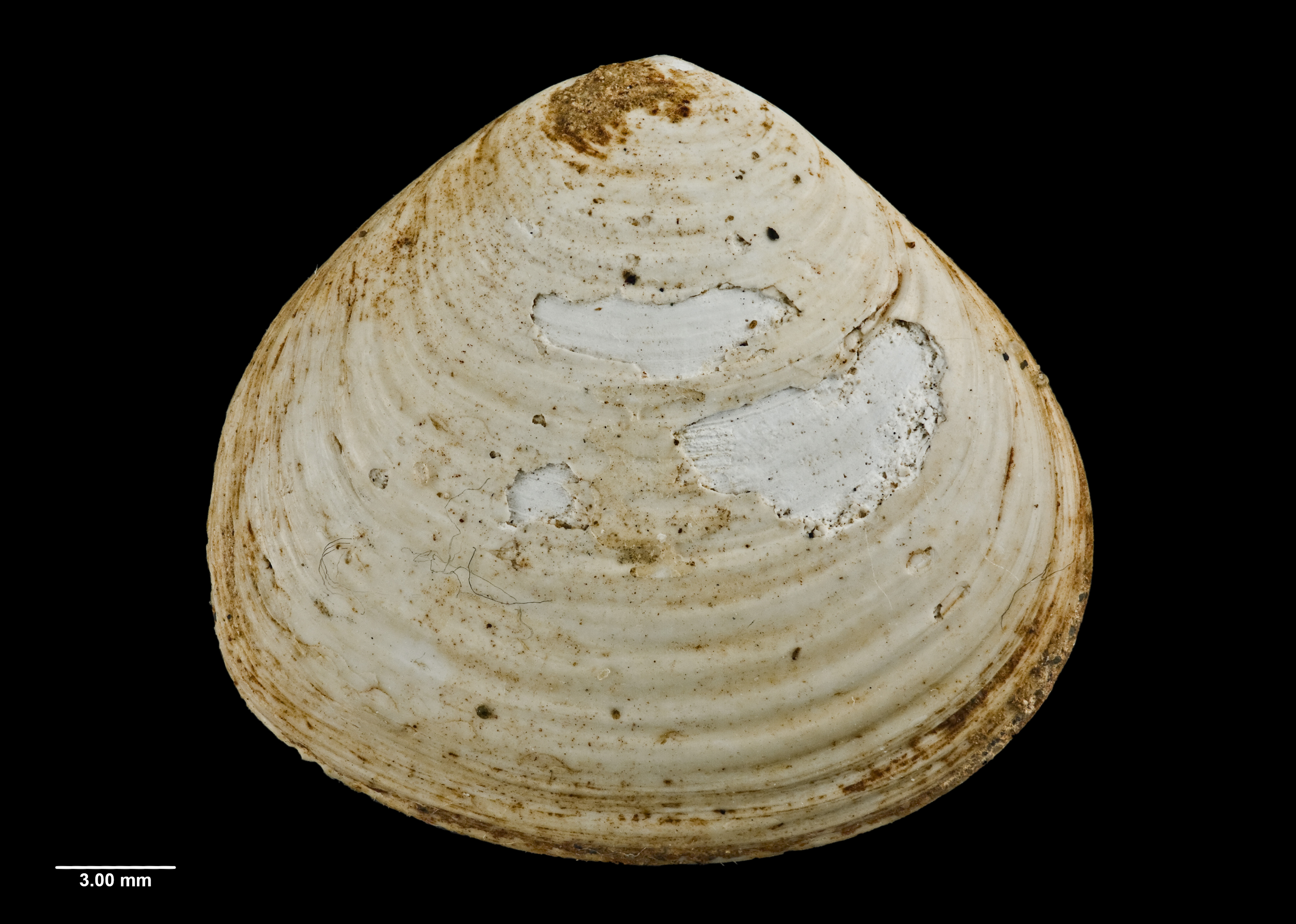
Opposite shell

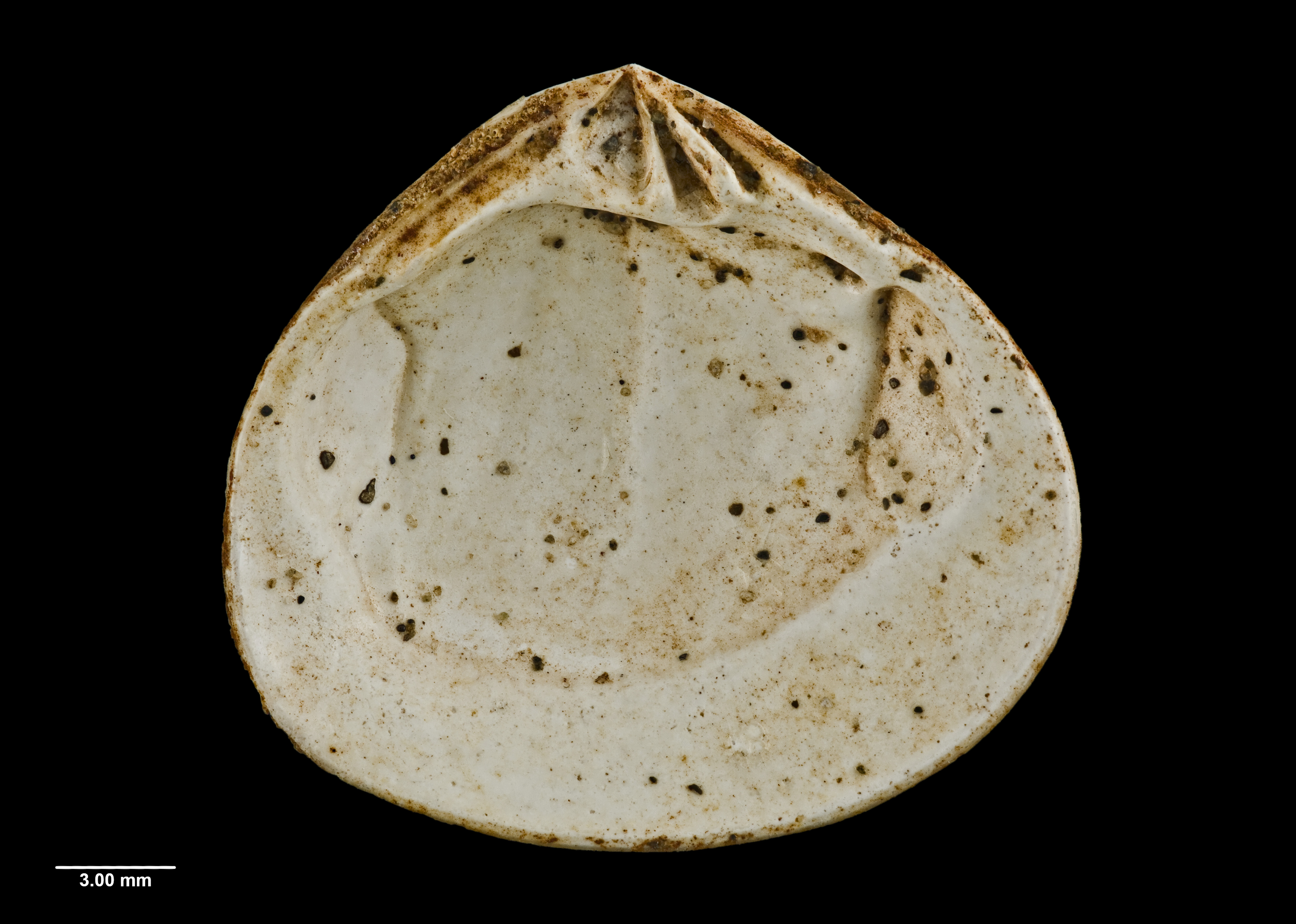
Underside of opposite shell
