= Miaoli Station =

Miaoli station (Chinese: 苗栗車站; pinyin: Miáolì chēzhàn) may refer to the following stations in Miaoli County, Taiwan:

- Miaoli HSR station, a Taiwan High Speed Rail station in Houlong, opened in 2015
- Miaoli railway station, a TRA station on the Taichung line in Miaoli City, opened in 1903
