= Chung-He Cheng =

Taiwanese literary figure

Chung-He Cheng was a Taiwanese literary figure of the Qing Dynasty.

He was a local landowner in Zhuqian (now Hsinchu) who founded the local Cheng family. After settling in Zhuqian in 1806, he took up teaching as his profession. His son Yung-Hsi Cheng was the first successful candidate in the highest imperial examinations in Taiwan.

The descendants of Chung-He Cheng are divided into four major branches, and they take turns to visit the tomb in autumn every year.

== Tomb ==
Chung-He Cheng's tomb is located in Houlong Township, Miaoli County.

It was built by Yung-Hsi Cheng and rebuilt by Chung-He Cheng's grandson in 1867, when Cheng and his wife were was buried together. It was designated as a monument in 1985. Restoration began in 1996, and it was completed in June 1998.

It was built in the seventh year during the reign of Emperor Daoguang of the Qing Dynasty (1827).

The tomb is called Flagstaff Tomb by local residents, because of the stone watchtower in front of the tomb.

=== Layout ===
Chung-He Cheng's tomb is an ancient tomb with three curved handrails. It has a stone seal, a stone pen, and a stone lion on the pillars of the curved handrails, and a pair of stone figures, stone horses, stone sheep, stone tigers, and stone supports in front of it.

In front of the tomb, there is a tombstone with an inscription.
