= Guogang Shell Fossils =

Stratum of shellfish fossils in Miaoli County, Taiwan

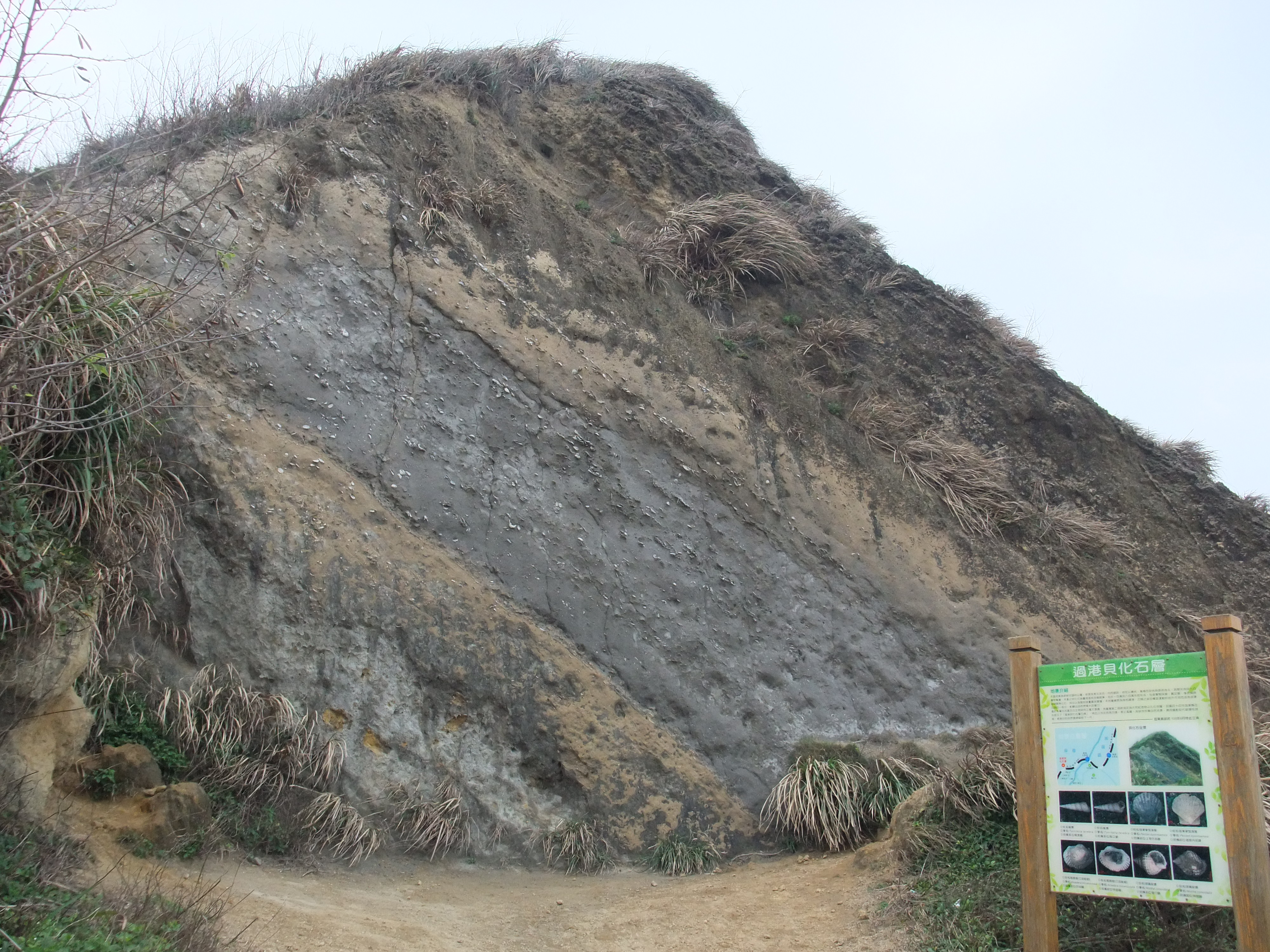
An outcrop of the stratum

The Guogang Shell Fossils (Chinese: 過港貝化石層; pinyin: Guògǎng Bèihuàshí Céng) refer to a bed that contains many fossils, mostly shellfish, that are located in Houlong, Miaoli County, Taiwan.

== Geology ==
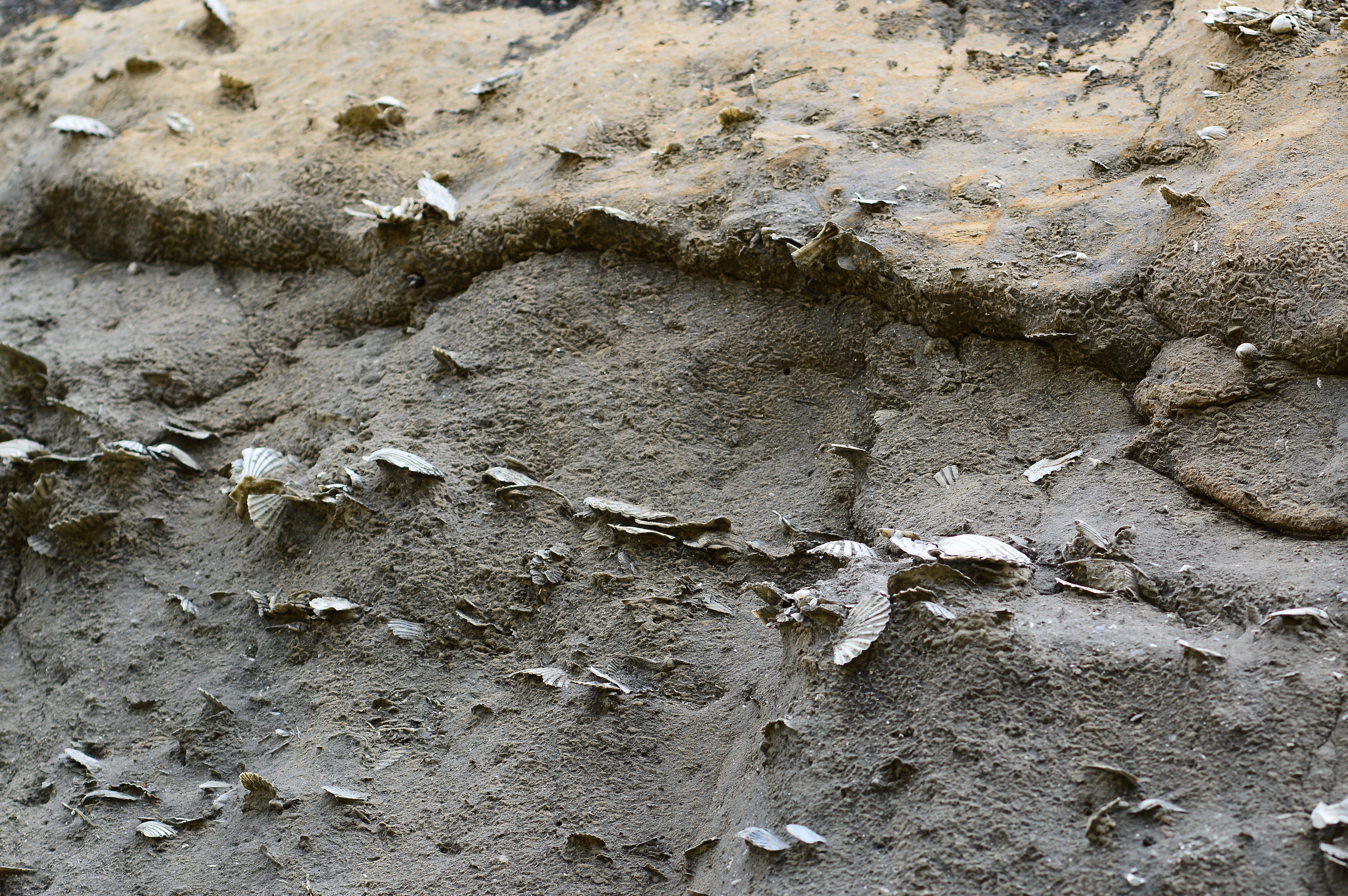
Closeup on the fossils

The bed is part of the larger Toukeshan Formation (頭嵙山層), a Pleistocene-era formation. The fossils date from between 1,030,000 and 460,000 years ago and are embedded in shale. The shells were likely located around 20 metres (66 ft) to 50 metres (160 ft) underwater before being covered. Fossils from 135 different species have been identified: most shells from the Pecten genus, but shells from Chlamys, Anadara, Arca, Eucrassatella, Nassarius, Niotha, Bursa, Turritella, and Murex have also been identified. Some suggested that the high density of fossils is due to repeated storms pushing the shellfish into this area.

== History ==
The bed was discovered in 1921 by Japanese railway construction workers building the Coastal line. In 1935 Government-General of Taiwan protected the area as a natural monument. After the handover to the ROC government, the Miaoli County Government installed a plaque in 1955, prohibiting people from disturbing the fossils. In 1995–1999, the Forestry Bureau surveyed the site and designated it as a provincial-level protected site.

Due to the outcrop's proximity to a road, many of the fossils have been removed or vandalized by tourists. The Liberty Times reported that most fossils "within arms reach" have been taken.
