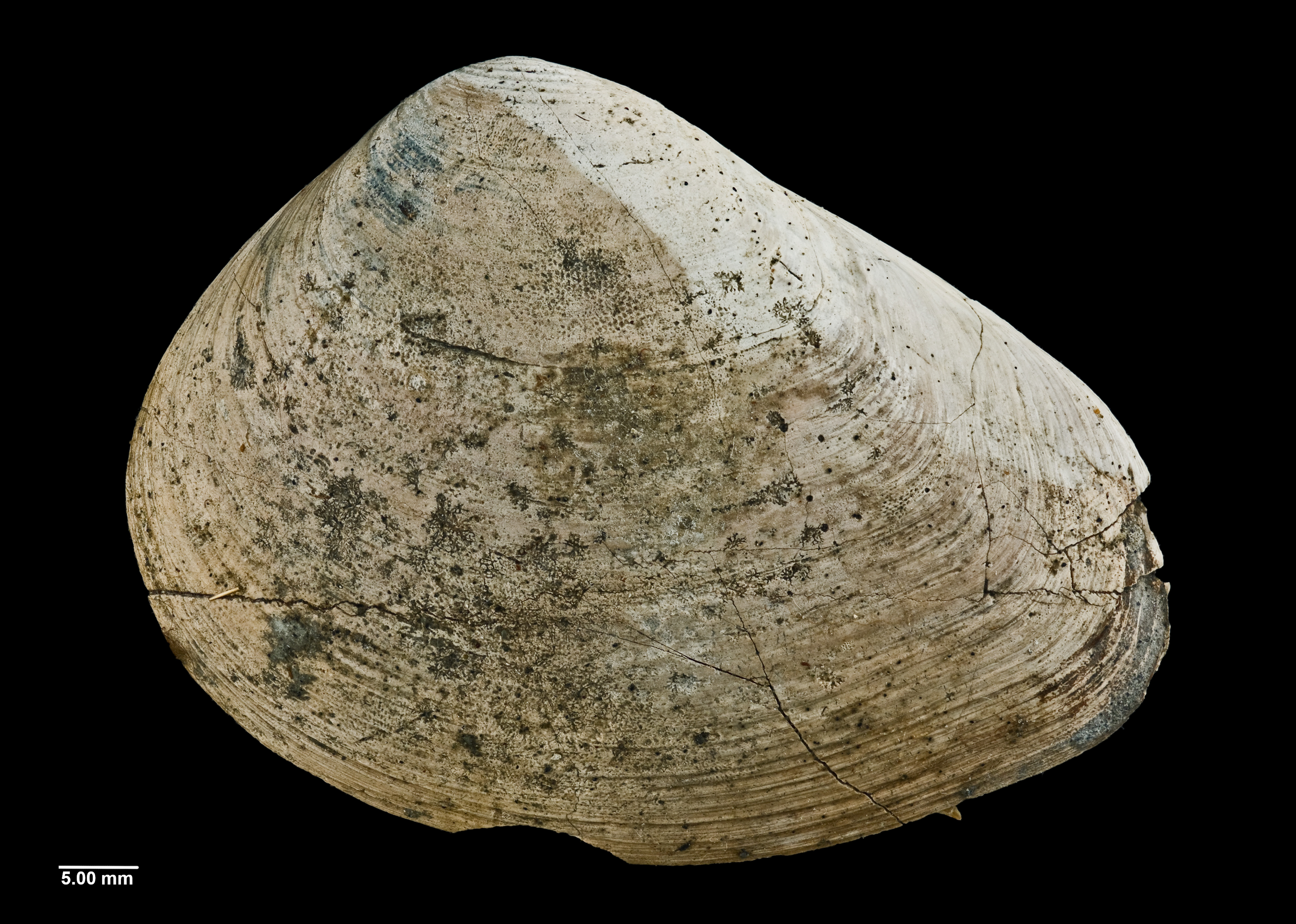
- Holotype from Auckland War Memorial Museum

Scientific classification
- Kingdom: Animalia
- Phylum: Mollusca
- Class: Bivalvia
- Order: Carditida
- Family: Crassatellidae
- Genus: Eucrassatella
- Species: E. marshalli

Binomial name
- Eucrassatella marshalli A. W. B. Powell, 1931

= Eucrassatella marshalli =

Eucrassatella marshalli Temporal range: 3.70 Ma

Species of bivalve

Eucrassatella marshalli is a species of bivalve, a marine mollusc in the family Crassatellidae. Fossils of the species date to the Waipipian stage (3.70 million years ago) of the late Pliocene in New Zealand. Based on morphological evidence, the species is likely a descendant of the late Miocene species E. ampla, and is ancestral species to the recent Australian species E. kingicola.

== Description ==
In the original description, Powell described the species as follows:

Shell moderately large, solid, elongated, and subtruncated posteriorly. Anterior end short, rapidly descending, convex, imperceptably merged into broadly convex ventral margin. Posterior end more gradually descending, almost straight. Truncation moderately wide, slightly oblique and subangled above and below. There is a very slight external fold running from the umbo to the lower angle of the truncation. Initial sculpture of coarse sulcations about one per millimetre and extending not more than eight millimetres down from the umbo, after which the shell is smooth except for faint lines of growth. Hinge identical with that of the genotype, even to the characteristic downward bulge in the middle of the plate and the massive anterior cardinal of the left valve. Left valve with two cardinals, the massive anterior and a thin posterior bordering the chondrophore. Right valve with three cardinals, a narrow anterior and a massive median with an inconspicuous lamellate posterior diverging from its side. There is an anterior and a posterior lateral in each valve. Adductor muscle scars of identical shape to those of the genotype..

The holotype of the species has a height of 49.5 mm (1.95 in), a length of 65.5 mm (2.58 in), and a thickness of 13.5 mm (0.53 in) for a single valve.

The species can be identified due to being smaller and less massive than E. ampla, by having very rounded posterior, anterior and umbonal regions, and by the species' dorsal margins being distinctly concave due to the impression of the lunule and escutcheon.

== Taxonomy ==
The species was first described by A. W. B. Powell in 1931. Based on morphological evidence, it is likely that the species evolved from E. ampla, a New Zealand fossil species of the late Miocene, and is an ancestral species to the recent Australian species E. kingicola.

The holotype was collected in January 1931 by Powell from 1.2 km (0.75 mi) west of the Wairoa Stream mouth near Waverley, Taranaki, and is a set of two syntypes, with each valve of similar size coming from two unrelated specimens. It is held in the collections of Auckland War Memorial Museum.

== Ecology ==
The species is one of the most common found in the Waipipian stage strata at its type locality on the coast of South Taranaki near Waverley.

== Distribution ==
This extinct marine species occurs in the late Pliocene Waipipian stage (3.70 million years ago) in New Zealand. Fossils of the species have been found in South Taranaki, and at Māngere in Auckland.

== Gallery ==
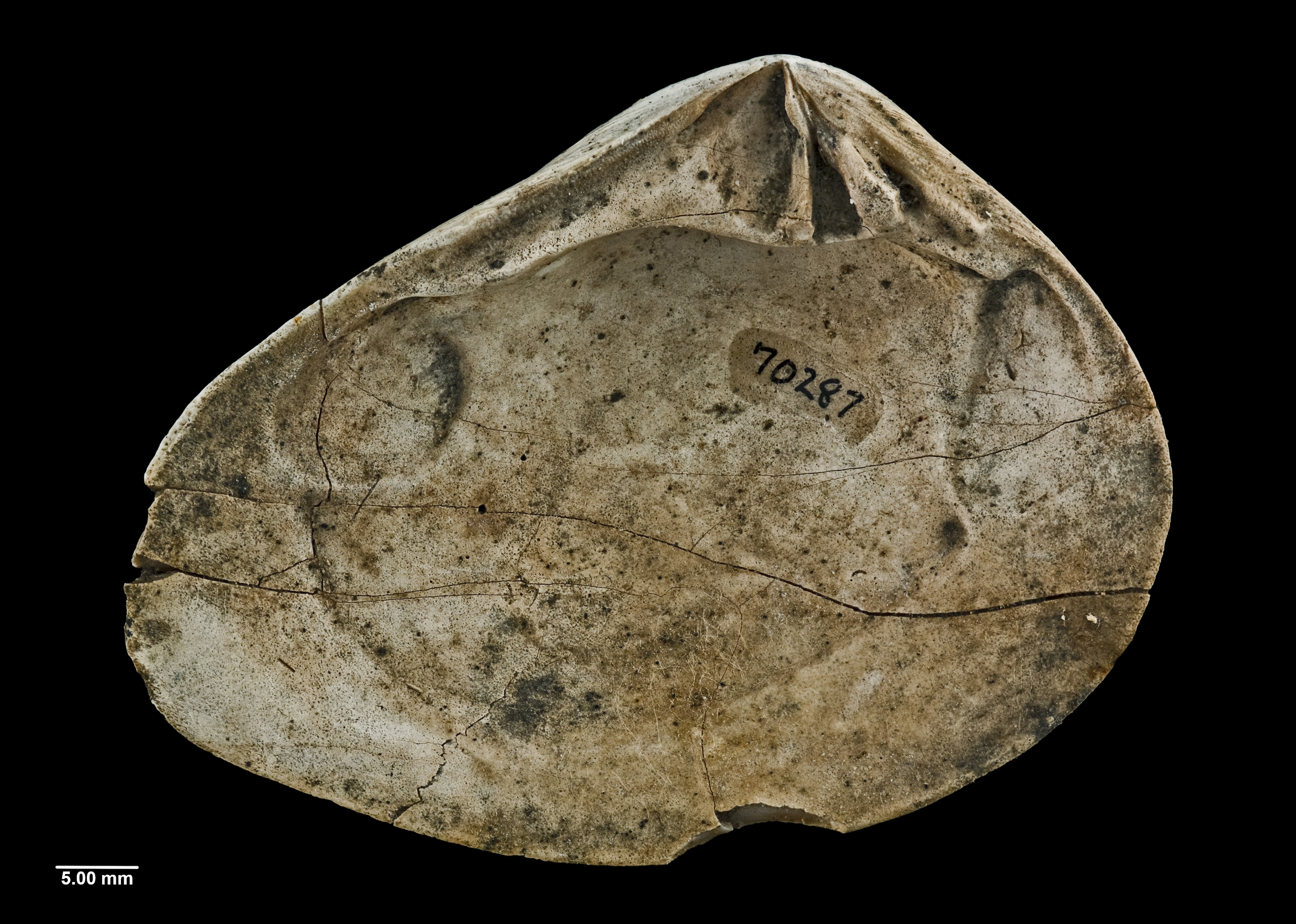
Reverse view

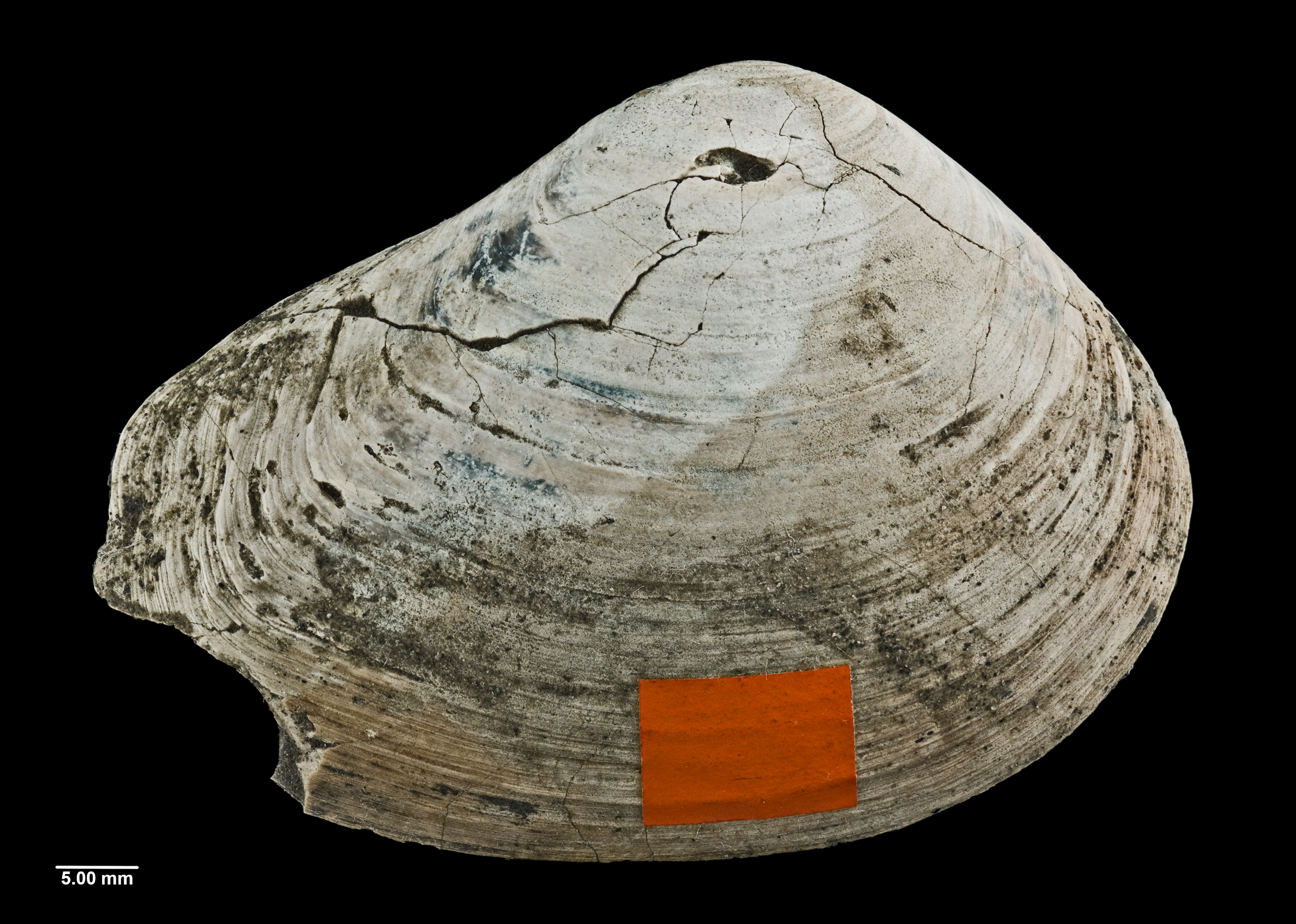
Opposite shell

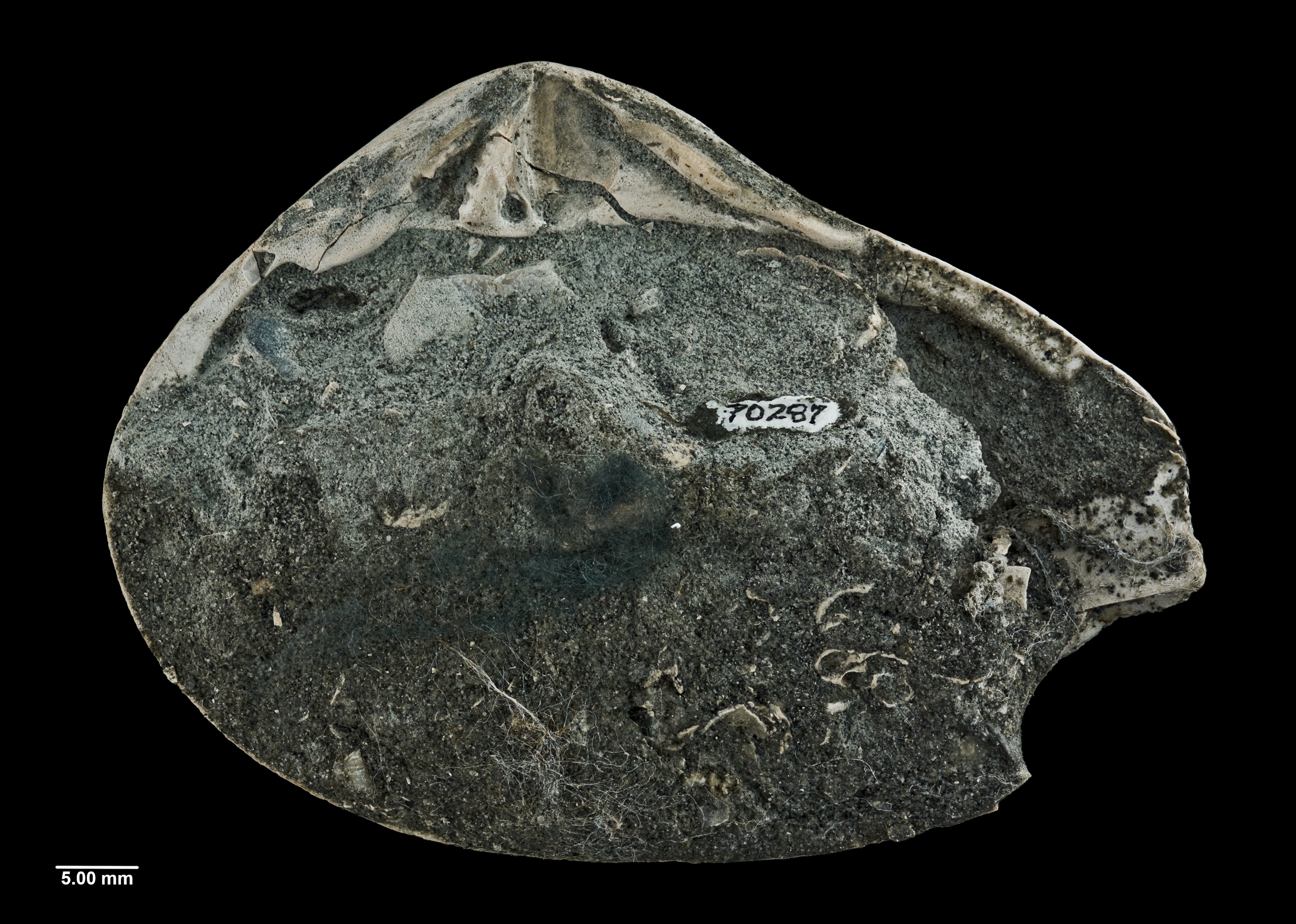
Reverse view of opposite shell
