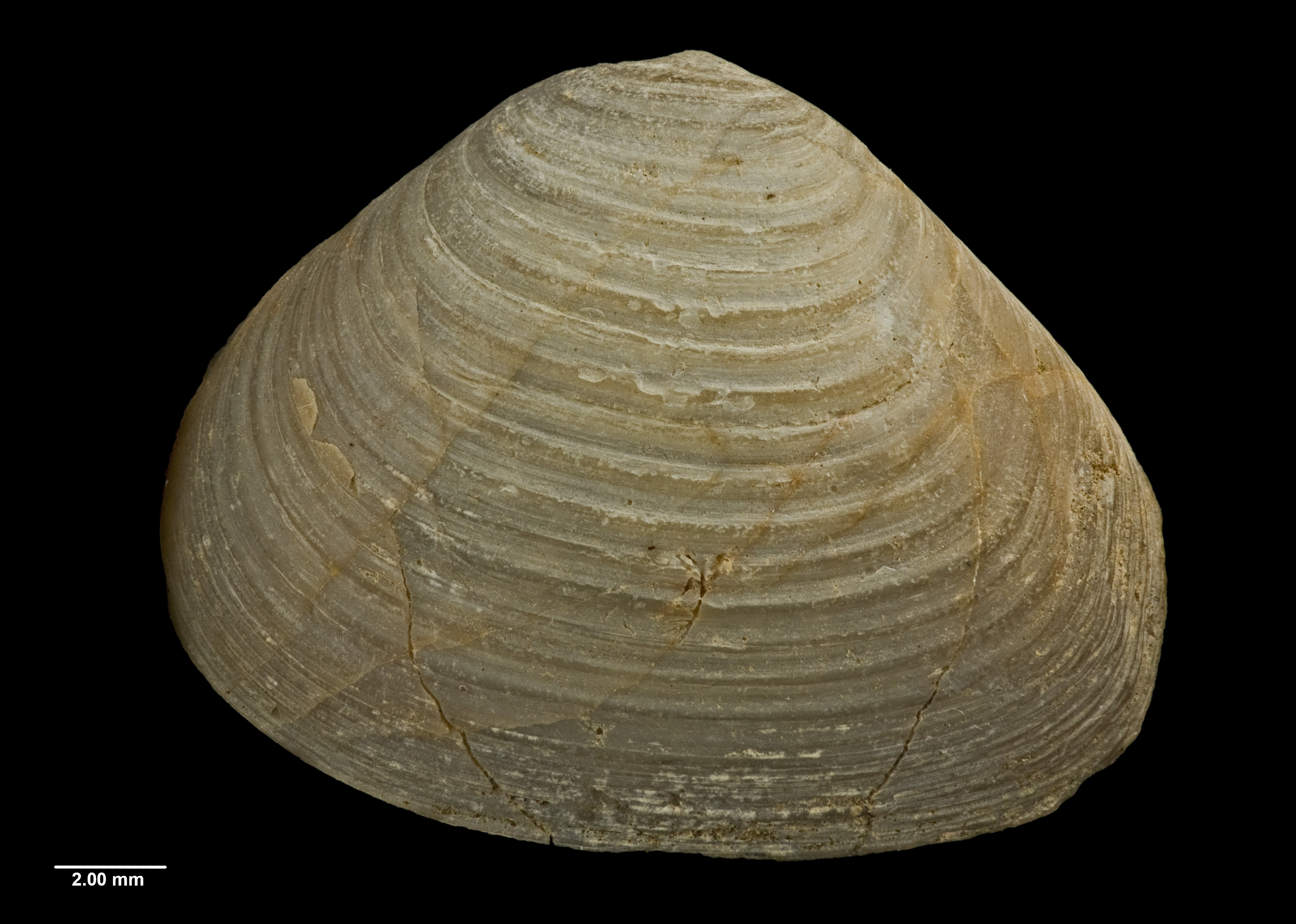
- Holotype from Auckland War Memorial Museum

Scientific classification
- Kingdom: Animalia
- Phylum: Mollusca
- Class: Bivalvia
- Order: Carditida
- Family: Crassatellidae
- Genus: Crassatina
- Species: C. senecta

Binomial name
- Crassatina senecta (A. W. B. Powell, 1931)

Synonyms
- Talabrica senecta A. W. B. Powell, 1931

= Crassatina senecta =

Crassatina senecta Temporal range: 3–1.63 Ma

Species of bivalve

Crassatina senecta is a species of bivalve, a marine mollusc in the family Crassatellidae. Fossils of the species date the Pleistocene in New Zealand between 3 and 1.63 million years ago, found in deposits which represent areas of deep water.

== Description ==
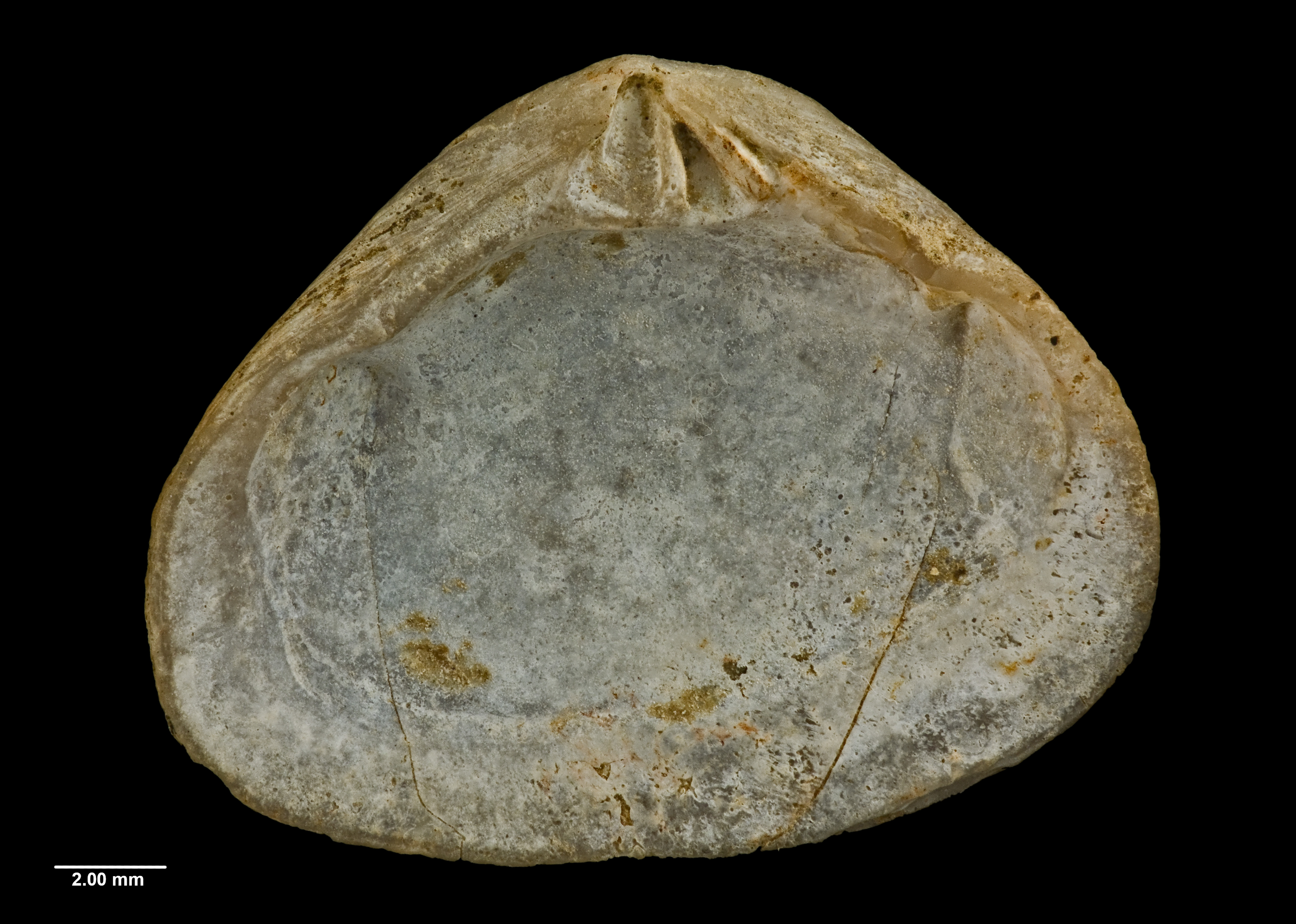
Reverse view of holotype

In the original description, Powell described the species as follows:

Shell ovate-subtrigonal, about the same size as the Recent New Zealand bellula, but more massive and less equilateral. Sculpture consisting of coarse, regular, concentric folds, diminishing in strength towards the posterior end, but nowhere flexed or undulating, as in the Recent species. The folds are about one and a-half per millimetre, except towards the umbo, where they are smaller and more closely spaced. They number about twenty-four in the adult shell, with interspaces about half the width of the folds. The posterior end is slightly longer than the anterior, its dorsal slope straight and descending to an indistinct subtruncation below. Hinge-plate solid and deep, with teeth arranged and formed as in bellula, but much more massive. Valve margins smooth.

The holotype of the species has a height of 15 mm (0.59 in), a length of 18.5 mm (0.73 in), and a thickness of 4.75 mm (0.187 in) for a single valve.

== Taxonomy ==
The species was first described by A. W. B. Powell in 1931, using the name Talabrica senecta. While the accepted name in New Zealand as of 2009 was Talabrica nummaria, the World Register of Marine Species lists the accepted name as Crassatina senecta. The holotype, a left valve, was collected in January 1926 by Powell from Castlepoint on the lighthouse reef in the Wairarapa, and is held in the collections of Auckland War Memorial Museum.

== Ecology ==
The species lived in deep waters.

== Distribution ==
This extinct marine species occurs in the Pleistocene, between the Mangapanian stage and the Nukumaruan stage (between 3–1.63 million years ago) in New Zealand, including the Castlepoint Formation at Castlepoint, the Konewa Formation at Pohangina, the Whariki Formation near Parikino in the Whanganui District.
