= Hakka Round House =

Cultural center in Houlong, Miaoli County, Taiwan

- 客家圓樓
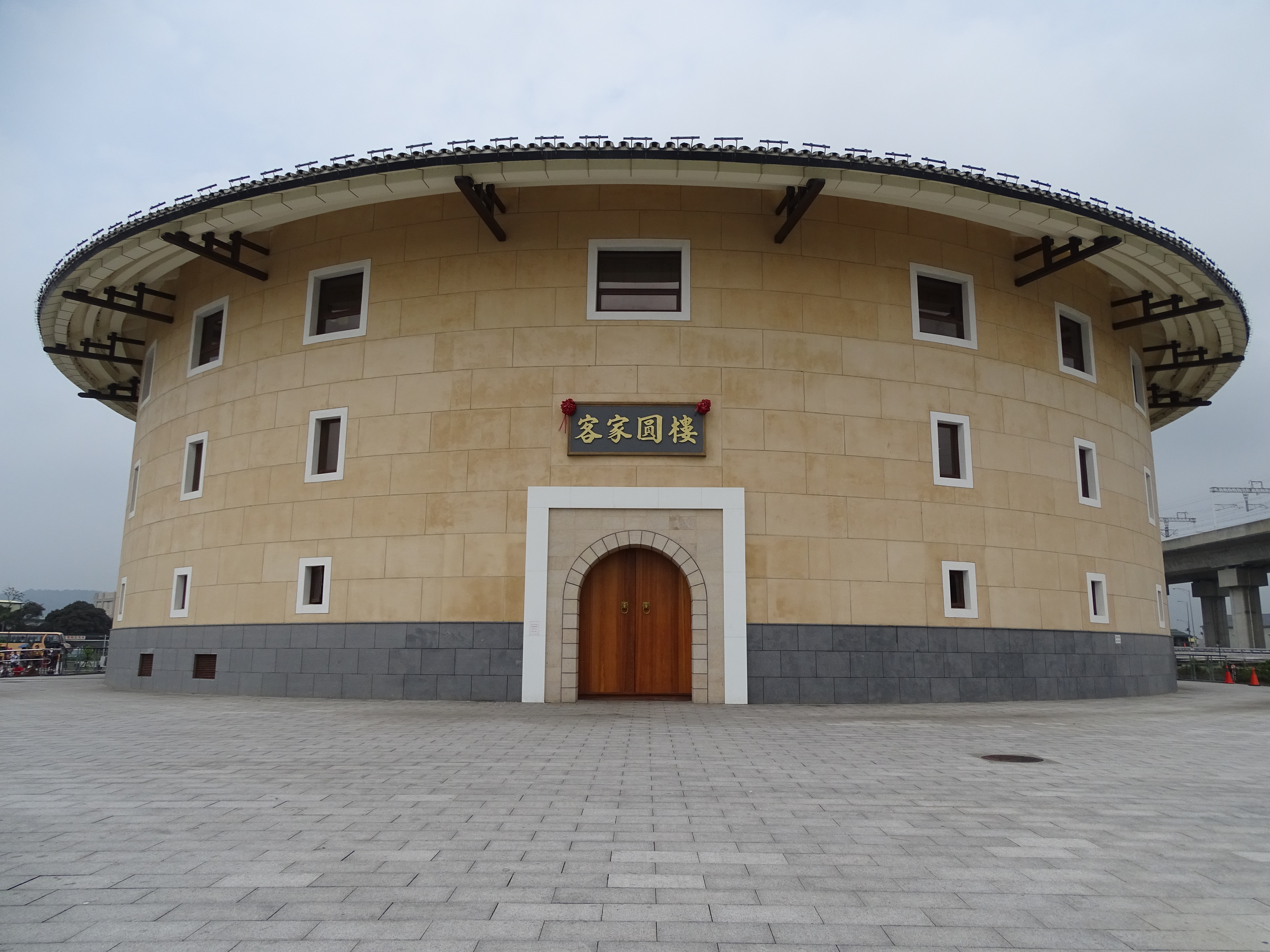
- Interactive map of the Hakka Round House area

General information
- Location: Houlong, Miaoli County, Taiwan
- Coordinates: 24°36′12.7″N 120°49′24.1″E
- Opened: 25 October 2014
- Cost: NT$130 million
- Owner: Miaoli County Government

Technical details
- Floor count: 4
- Floor area: 3,476 m^{2}

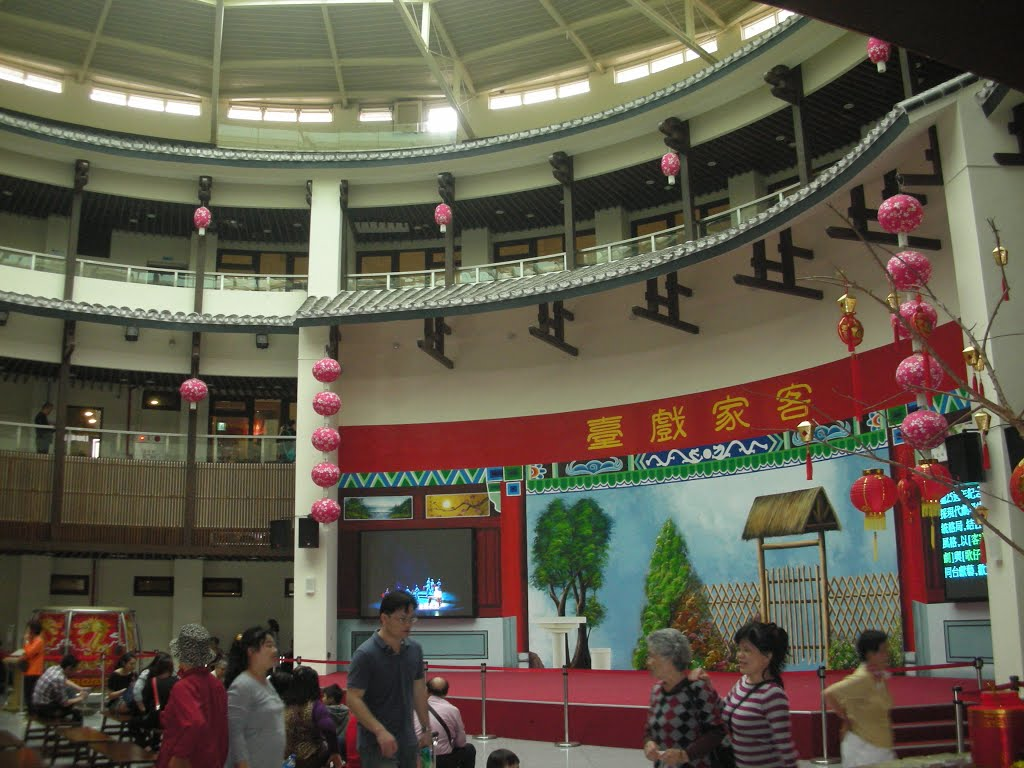
Hakka Round House interior

The Hakka Round House (Note: traditional Chinese: 客家圓樓; simplified Chinese: 客家圆楼; pinyin: Kèjiā Yuánlóu) is a Hakka building in Houlong Township, Miaoli County, Taiwan.

== History ==
The house was built by Miaoli County Government and was opened on 25 October 2014 with a cost of NT$130 million (US$4.12 million). In 2015, the county government planned to tender the operation of the building to ease its financial debt.

== Architecture ==
The design of the brick house is based on the architecture of tulou in Fujian. The house also consists of ring-shaped trails, arc-shaped observation deck, a welcoming square and water paths. The house has one floor underground and three floors above the ground. The basement floor consists of a multimedia viewing room, the ground floor consists of a round exhibition and performance hall, the upper floor consists of an exhibition space and the top most floor consists of DIY classrooms. The building spans over a land area of 1,385 m^{2} with a total floor area of 3,476 m^{2}.

== Transportation ==
The house is accessible from Miaoli Station of Taiwan High Speed Rail or Fengfu Station of Taiwan Railway.

== See also ==
- List of tourist attractions in Taiwan
