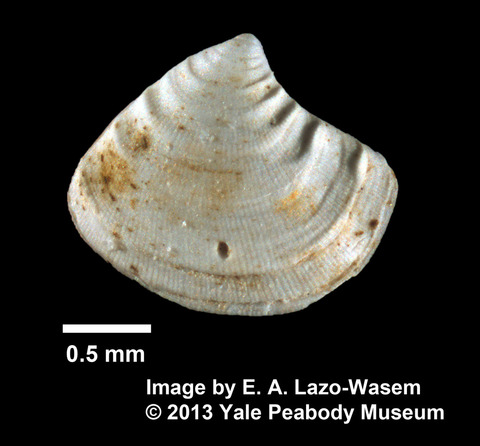

Scientific classification
- Kingdom: Animalia
- Phylum: Mollusca
- Class: Bivalvia
- Order: Carditida
- Superfamily: Crassatelloidea
- Family: Crassatellidae
- Genus: Crassinella
- Species: C. lunulata

Binomial name
- Crassinella lunulata (Conrad, 1834)

= Crassinella lunulata =

Species of bivalve

Crassinella lunulata, or the lunate crassinella, is a species of very small bivalve mollusc in the family Crassatellidae. It can be found along the Atlantic coast of North America, ranging from Massachusetts to Texas.
