= Fengfu railway station =

Railway station in Houlong, Miaoli County, Taiwan

Fengfu Station 豐富車站
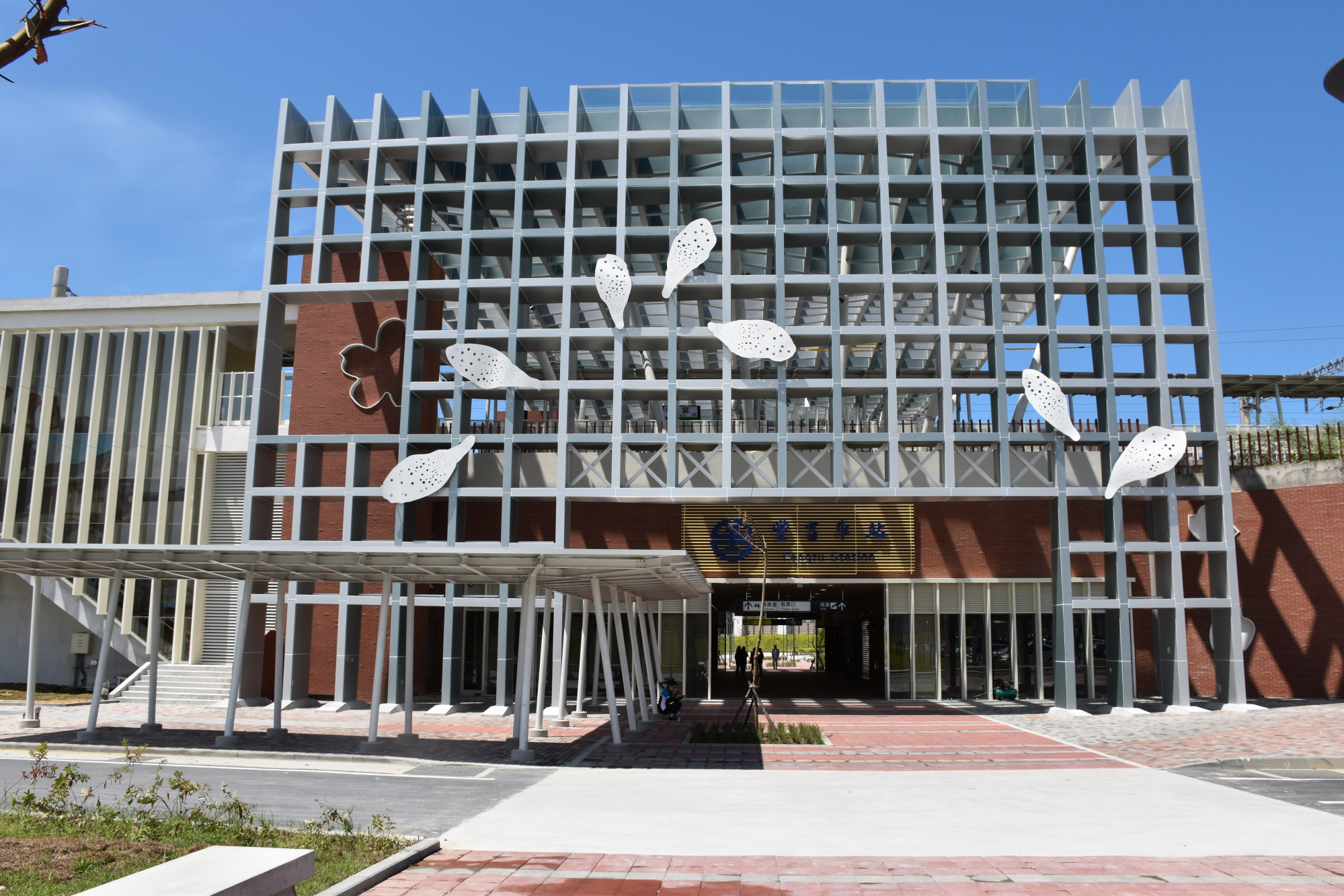

General information
- Location: Houlong, Miaoli County, Taiwan
- Coordinates: 24°36′4.5″N 120°49′25.1″E
- System: Train station
- Owner: Taiwan Railway Corporation
- Operator: Taiwan Railway Corporation
- Line: Western Trunk line
- Train operators: Taiwan Railway Corporation

Construction
- Structure type: Ground level

History
- Opened: 25 May 1903

Services
| Preceding station | Taiwan Railway | Following station |
|---|---|---|
| Zaoqiao towards Keelung | Western Trunk line | Miaoli towards Kaohsiung |
Location

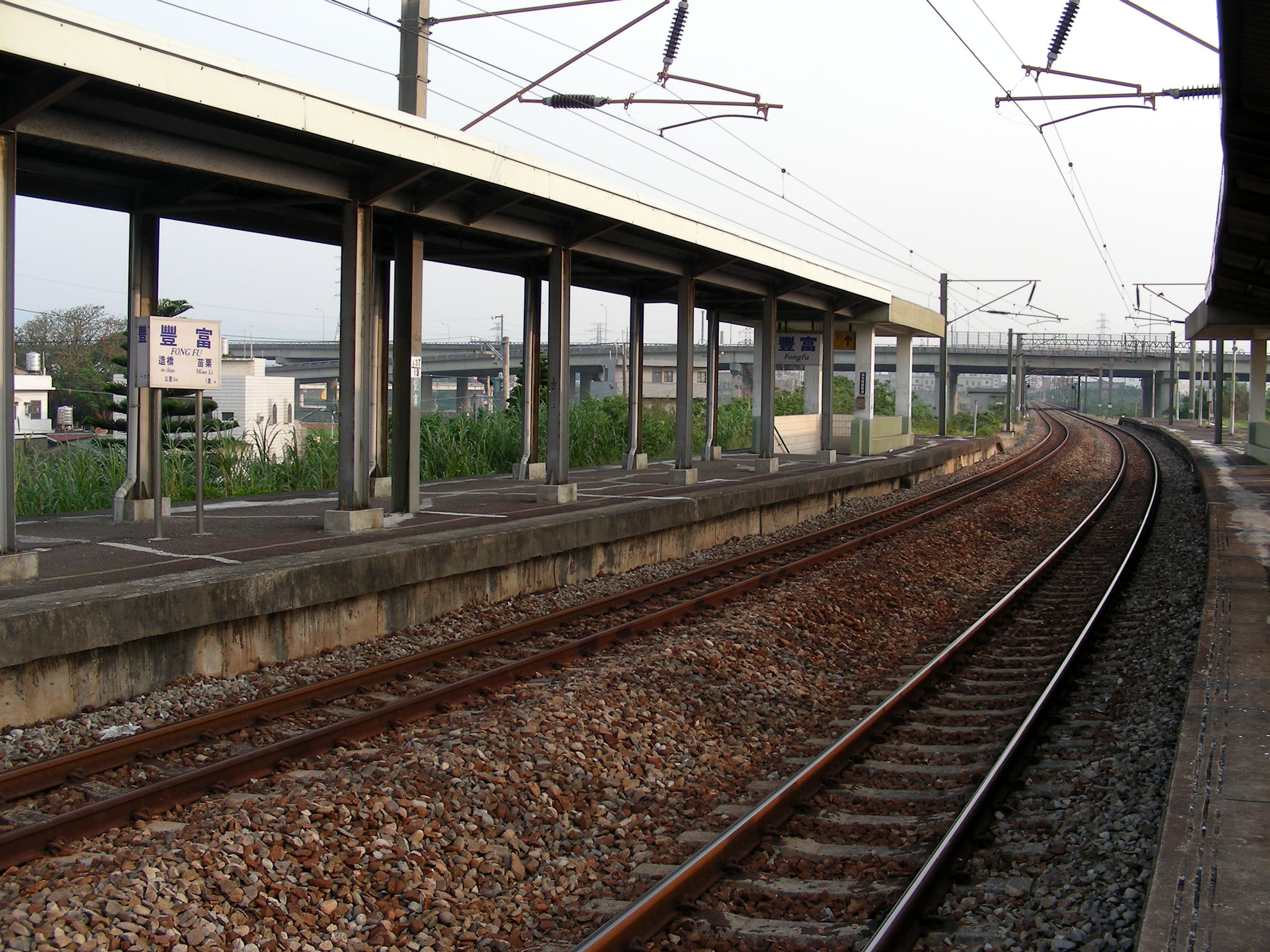
Fengfu station platform

Fengfu (Chinese: 豐富車站; Hanyu Pinyin: Fēngfù Chēzhàn; Tongyong Pinyin: Fongfù Chejhàn) is a railway station of Taiwan Railway Taichung line located in Houlong Township, Miaoli County, Taiwan. Transfers to THSR Miaoli Station can be made at this station.

== History ==
- 25 May 1903: The station opened for service.
- 10 September 2016: The station was moved approx. 400 meters north from its original location to allow transfers to THSR Miaoli Station.

== Around the station ==
- Hakka Round House
- THSR Miaoli Station

== See also ==
- List of railway stations in Taiwan
