= Houlong railway station =

Railway station in Miaoli, Taiwan

Houlong Station 後龍車站
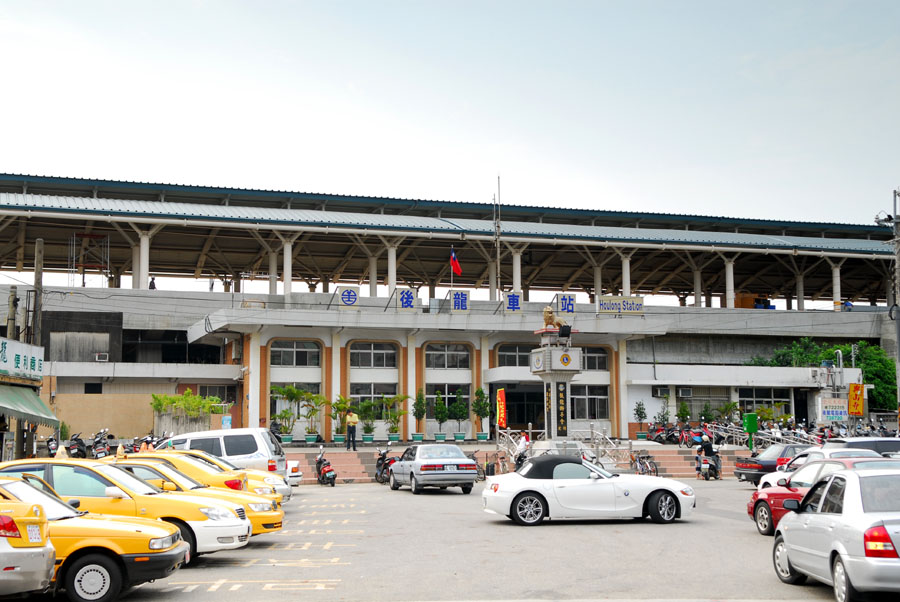

General information
- Location: Houlong, Miaoli County, Taiwan
- Coordinates: 24°36′57.0″N 120°47′13.4″E
- System: Train station
- Owner: Taiwan Railway
- Operator: Taiwan Railway
- Line: Western Trunk line
- Train operators: Taiwan Railway

History
- Opened: 11 October 1922

Passengers
- 2,264 daily (2024)

Services
Preceding station	Taiwan Railway	Following station
Dashan towards Zhunan	Western Trunk line (coastal)	Longgang towards Changhua
Location

Houlong (Chinese: 後龍車站; pinyin: Hòulóng Chēzhàn) is a railway station on Taiwan Railway West Coast line (Coastal line) located in Houlong Township, Miaoli County, Taiwan.

== History ==
The station was opened on 11 October 1922.

== See also ==
- List of railway stations in Taiwan
