= Dashan railway station =

Railway station in Miaoli, Taiwan

Dashan Station 大山車站
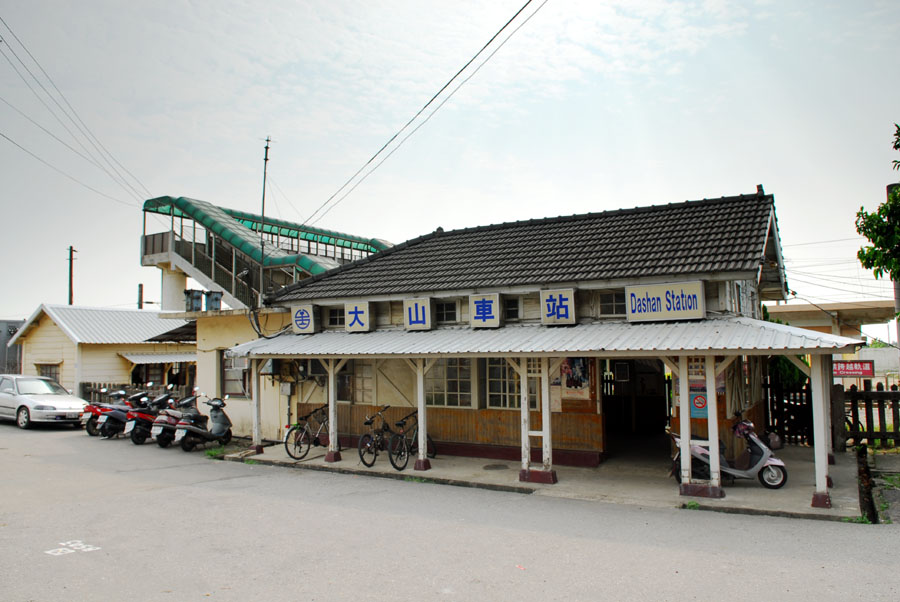

General information
- Location: Houlong, Miaoli County, Taiwan
- Coordinates: 24°38′44.1″N 120°48′13.8″E
- System: Train station
- Owner: Taiwan Railway
- Operator: Taiwan Railway
- Line: Western Trunk line
- Train operators: Taiwan Railway

History
- Opened: 11 October 1922

Passengers
- 167 daily (2024)
Location

Dashan (Chinese: 大山車站; pinyin: Dàshān Chēzhàn) is a railway station on Taiwan Railway West Coast line (Coastal line) located in Houlong Township, Miaoli County, Taiwan.

== History ==
The station was opened on 11 October 1922.

== Around the station ==
- Waipu Fishing Port

== See also ==
- List of railway stations in Taiwan

Preceding station	Taiwan Railway	Following station
Tanwen towards Keelung	Western Trunk line	Houlong towards Pingtung
