= Yingtsai Academy =

Former tutorial academy in Houlong, Miaoli County, Taiwan

Yingtsai Academy 英才書院
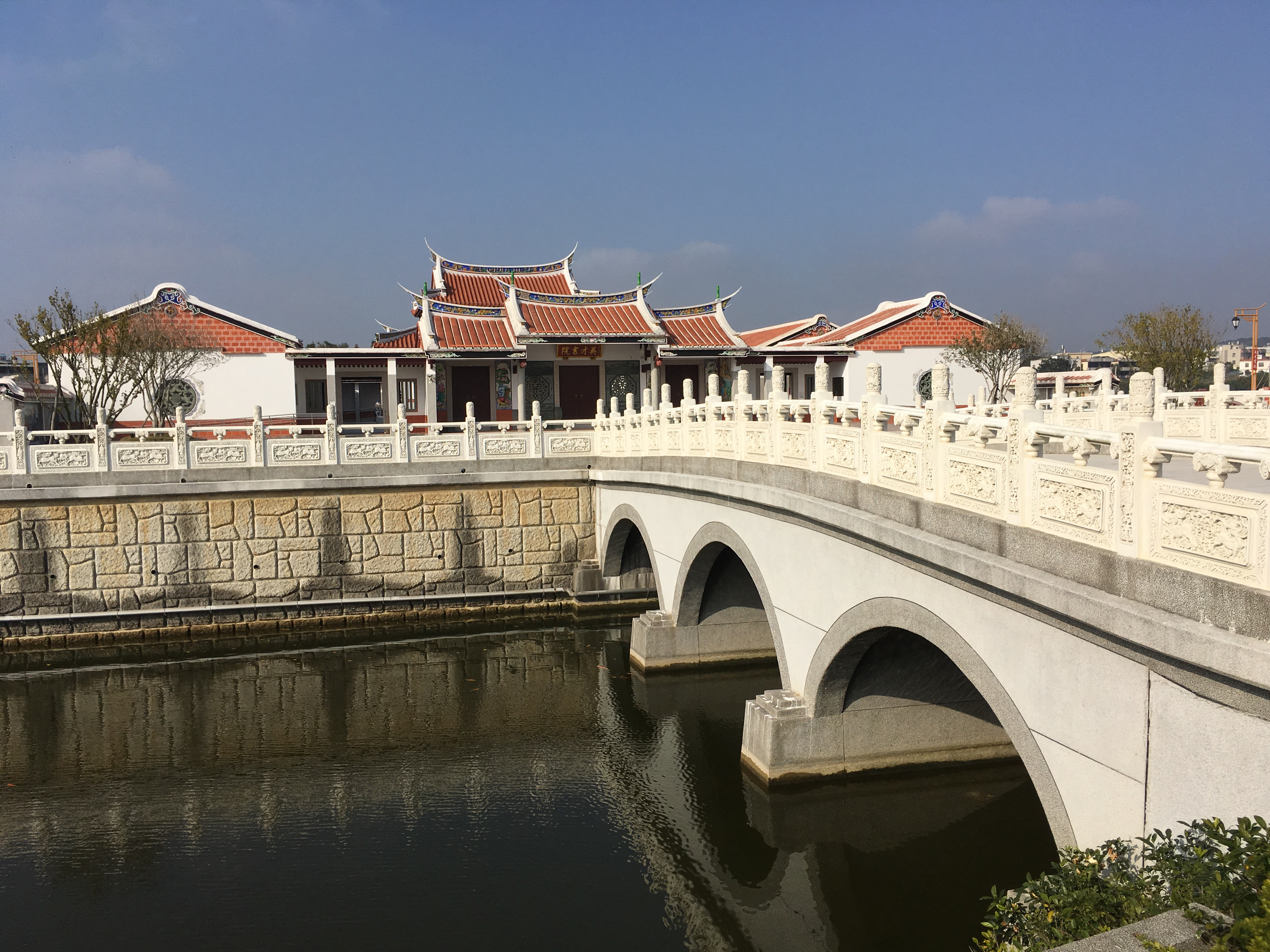

Location
- Houlong, Miaoli County, Taiwan
- Coordinates: 24°36′31.4″N 120°48′57.4″E

Information
- Type: former academy

The Yingtsai Academy (traditional Chinese: 英才書院; simplified Chinese: 英才书院; pinyin: Yīngcái Shūyuàn) is a former tutorial academy in Houlong Township, Miaoli County, Taiwan.

== Architecture ==
The academy was designed with Southern Min architectural style with a cost of NT$91 million. It features a bridge, garden and pond.

== Transportation ==
The academy is accessible within walking distance west of Miaoli Station of Taiwan High Speed Rail.

== See also ==
- List of tourist attractions in Taiwan
