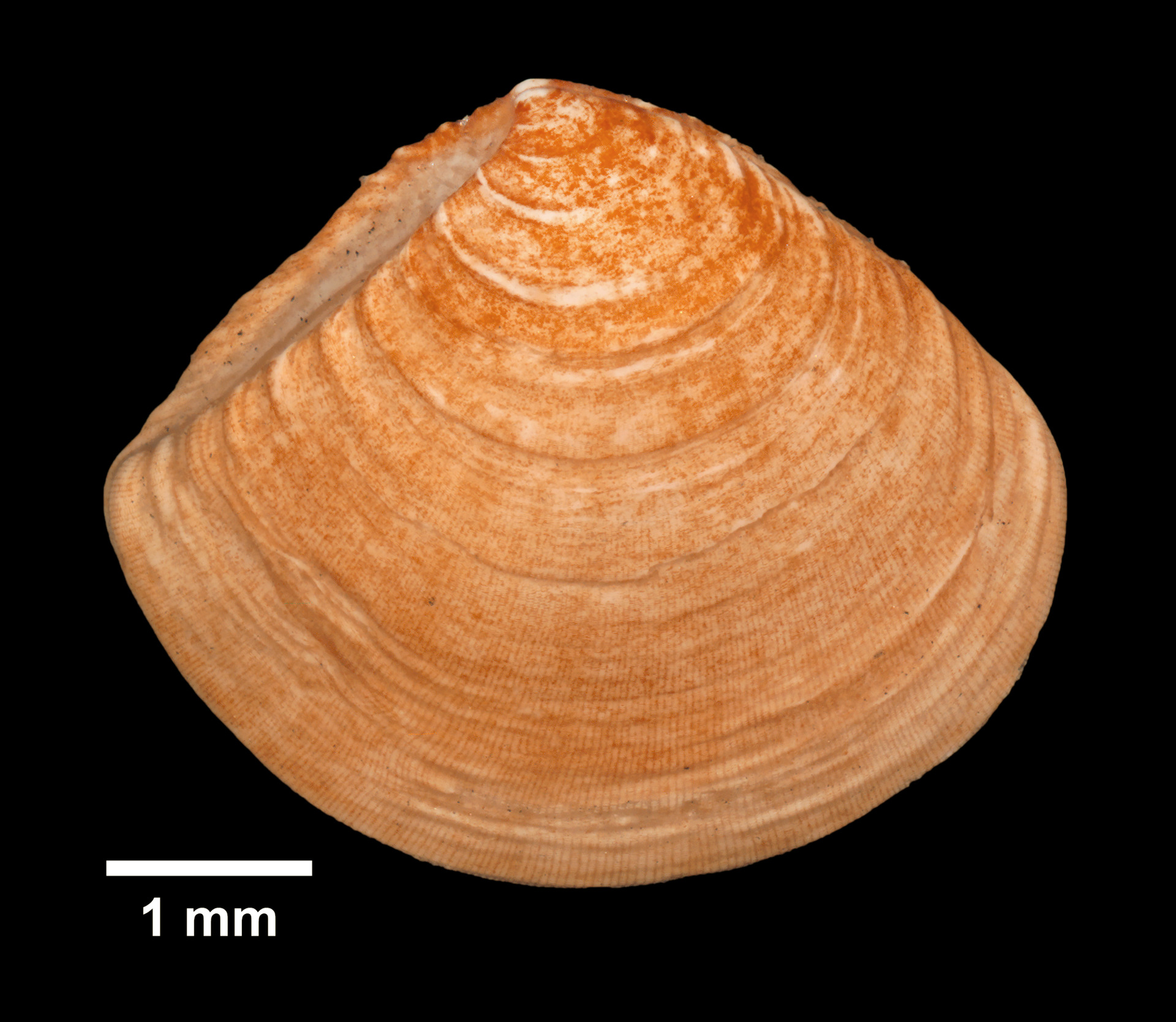

Scientific classification
- Domain: Eukaryota
- Kingdom: Animalia
- Phylum: Mollusca
- Class: Bivalvia
- Order: Carditida
- Family: Crassatellidae
- Genus: Crassinella; Guppy, 1874

= Crassinella =

Genus of bivalves

Crassinella is a genus of bivalves belonging to the family Crassatellidae.

The genus has almost cosmopolitan distribution.

== Species ==
Species:

- Crassatellites acutus (Dall, 1903)
- Crassatellites aldrichianus Aldrich, 1911
- Crassatellites bowdenensis (Dall, 1903)
- Crassatellites guppyi (Dall, 1896)
- Crassatellites midiensis (Olsson, 1922)
- Crassatellites triangulatus Dall, 1900
- Crassinella adamsi Olsson, 1961
- Crassinella coxa Olsson, 1964
- Crassinella dupliniana (Dall, 1903)
- Crassinella ecuadoriana Olsson, 1961
- Crassinella johnsoni Ward & Blackwelder, 1987
- Crassinella lata Nowell-Usticke, 1969
- Crassinella lunulata (Conrad, 1834)
- Crassinella maldonadoensis (Pilsbry, 1897)
- Crassinella marplatensis de Castellanos, 1970
- Crassinella martinicensis (d'Orbigny, 1853)
- Crassinella minor (Lea, 1833)
- Crassinella nuculiformis Berry, 1940
- Crassinella pacifica (C.B.Adams, 1852)
- Crassinella pygmaea
- Crassinella skoglundae Coan, 1979
- Crassinella variablis Dockery, 1982
- Crassinella varians (Carpenter, 1857)
- Crassinella xena Woodring, 1925
