= Xihu Wetland =

Wetland in Houlong, Miaoli County, Taiwan

- 西湖濕地 (Chinese)
- Location within Miaoli County
- Location: Houlong, Miaoli County, Taiwan
- Coordinates: 24°36′46.6″N 120°45′19.1″E
- Type: wetland
- Surface area: 142 hectares (350 acres)

Xihu Wetland (traditional Chinese: 西湖濕地; simplified Chinese: 西湖湿地; pinyin: Xīhú Shīdì) is a wetland in Houlong Township, Miaoli County, Taiwan.

== History ==
In 2009, bicycle path and a windmill was constructed at the wetland area.

== Geology ==
The wetland spans over an area of 142 hectares. It is managed by Miaoli County Government.

== Transportation ==
The wetland is accessible within walking distance north of Longgang Station of Taiwan Railway.

== See also ==
- List of tourist attractions in Taiwan
