= Waipu Fishing Port =

Port in Houlong, Miaoli County, Taiwan

Waipu Fishing Port 外埔漁港
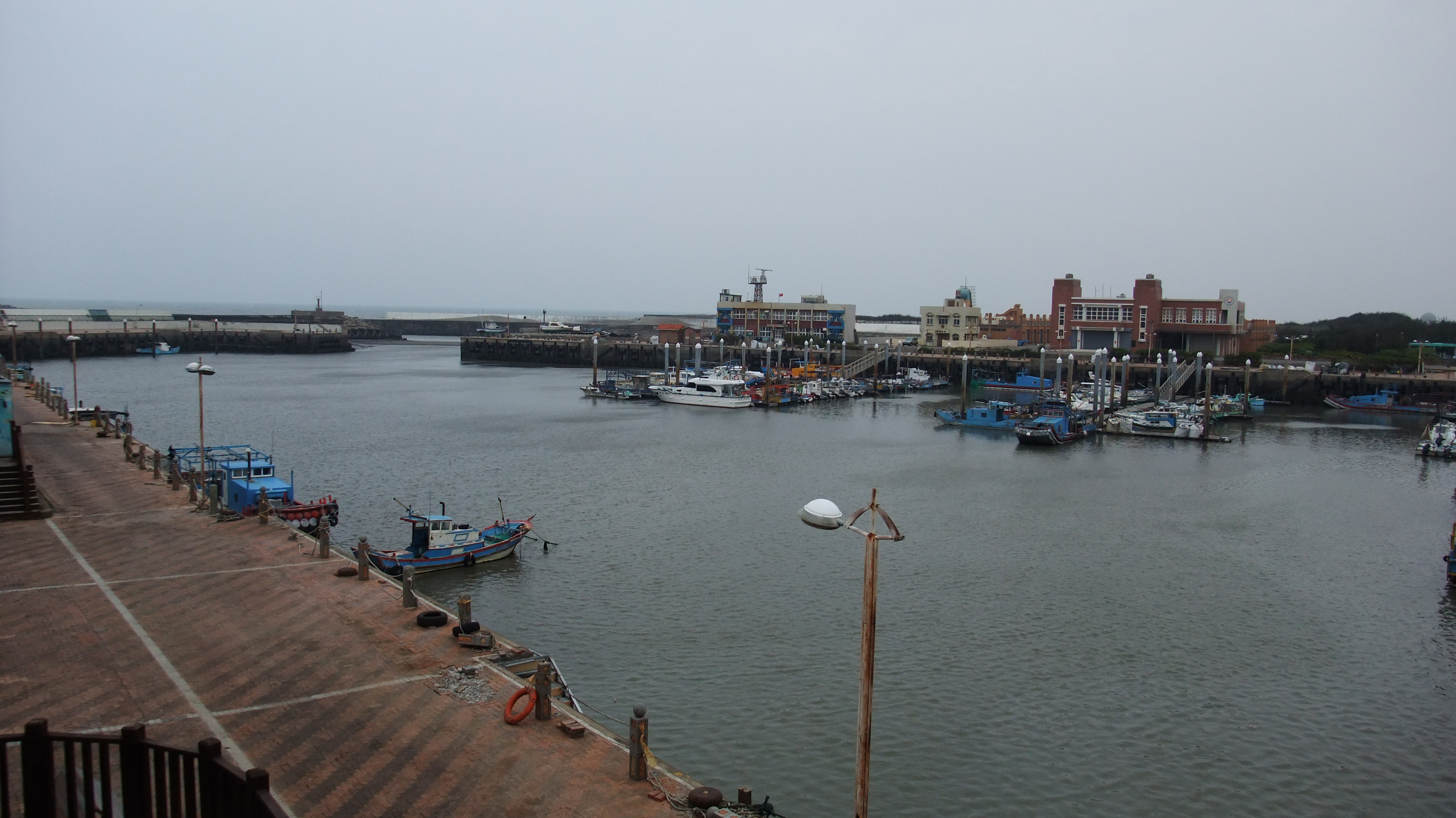
- Interactive map of Waipu Fishing Port 外埔漁港
- Location in Taiwan

Location
- Location: Houlong, Miaoli County, Taiwan
- Coordinates: 24°39′6.4″N 120°46′16.6″E

Details
- Type of harbour: fishing port

The Waipu Fishing Port (traditional Chinese: 外埔漁港; simplified Chinese: 外埔渔港; pinyin: Wàibù Yúgǎng) is a fishing port in Houlong Township, Miaoli County, Taiwan.

== Events ==
- 2012 Miaoli Marine Tour Festival

== Transportation ==
The port is accessible west from Dashan Station of Taiwan Railway.

== See also ==
- Fisheries Agency
