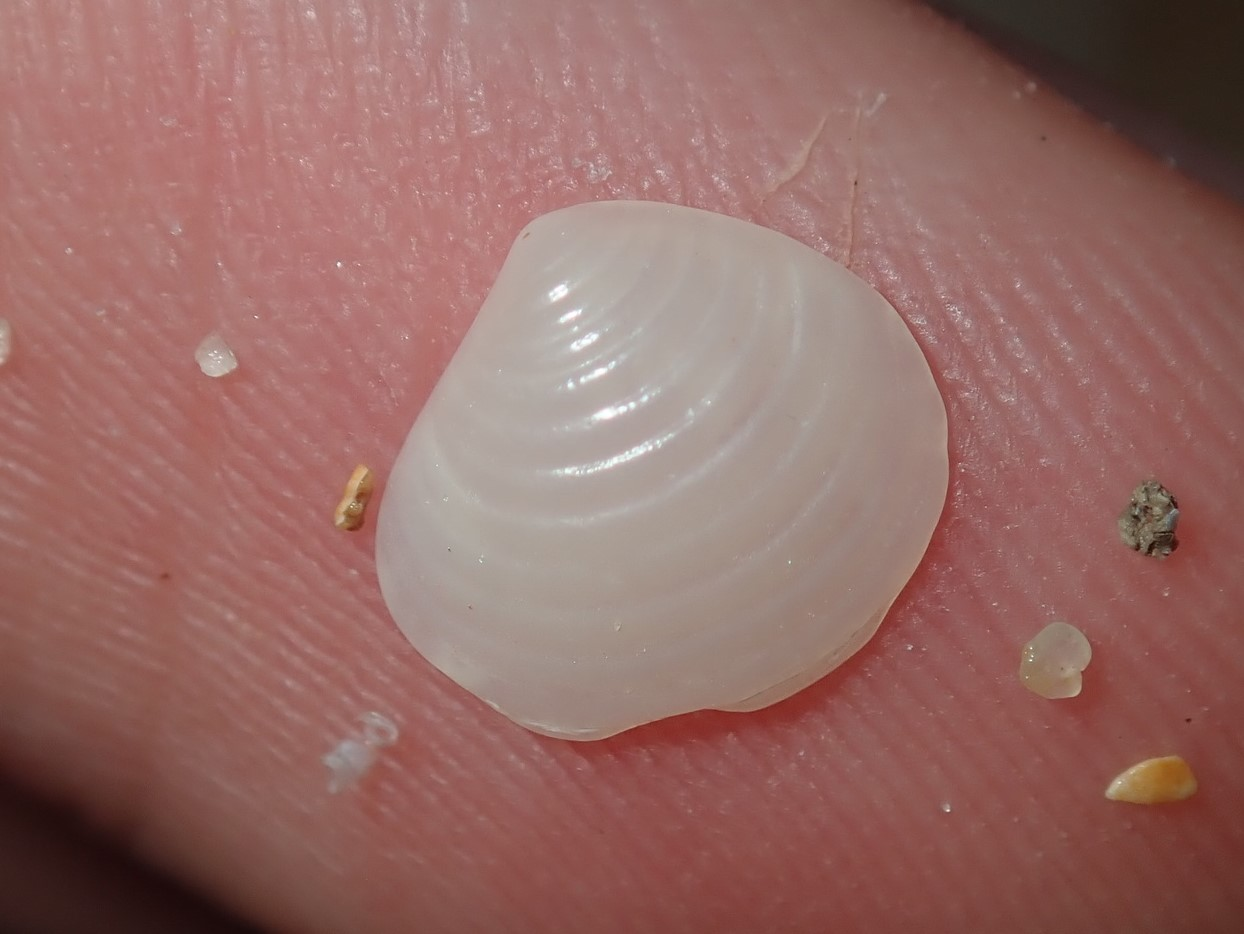
- Salaputium fulvidum

Scientific classification
- Kingdom: Animalia
- Phylum: Mollusca
- Class: Bivalvia
- Order: Carditida
- Superfamily: Crassatelloidea
- Family: Crassatellidae
- Genus: Salaputium; Iredale, 1924

Type species
- Crassatella fulvida Angas, 1871

= Salaputium =

Genus of bivalves

Salaputium is a genus of saltwater clams, marine bivalve molluscs in the family Crassatellidae.

== Species ==
The following species are recognised in the genus Salaputium:

- † Salaputium abbreviatum (Tate, 1886)
- † Salaputium communis (Tate, 1896)
- † Salaputium corioensis Chapple, 1934
- Salaputium discus (Hedley, 1907)
- Salaputium fulvidum (Angas, 1871)
- Salaputium iredalei Powell, 1958
- Salaputium janus (Hedley, 1906)
- † Salaputium lamellatum (Tate, 1886)
- † Salaputium martini Finlay, 1927
- Salaputium micrum (Verco, 1895)
- † Species Salaputium multilamellum (Tate, 1887)
- Salaputium probleemum (Verco, 1907)
- Salaputium productum (Verco, 1895)
- Salaputium rhomboides (E. A. Smith, 1885)
- Salaputium scabriliratum (Hedley, 1902)
- Salaputium securiforme (Hedley, 1902)
- Salaputium sublamellatum (Kobelt, 1885)
- † Salaputium tinopaica Laws, 1939
