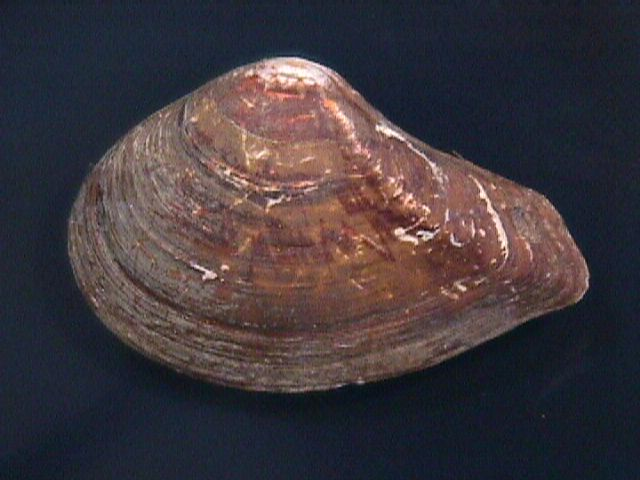

Scientific classification
- Kingdom: Animalia
- Phylum: Mollusca
- Class: Bivalvia
- Order: Carditida
- Family: Crassatellidae
- Genus: Kalolophus
- Species: K. speciosus

Binomial name
- Kalolophus speciosus (A. Adams, 1854)

Synonyms
- Crassatella antillarum var. floridana Dall, 1881; Crassatella gibbesii Tuomey & Holmes, 1856; Crassatella speciosa A. Adams, 1854 (original combination); Eucrassatella speciosa (A. Adams, 1854)

= Kalolophus speciosus =

Species of bivalve

Kalolophus speciosus, also known as the beautiful crassatella or Gibbs' clam, is a species of bivalve mollusc in the family Crassatellidae. It can be found along the Atlantic coast of North America, ranging from North Carolina to the West Indies.
