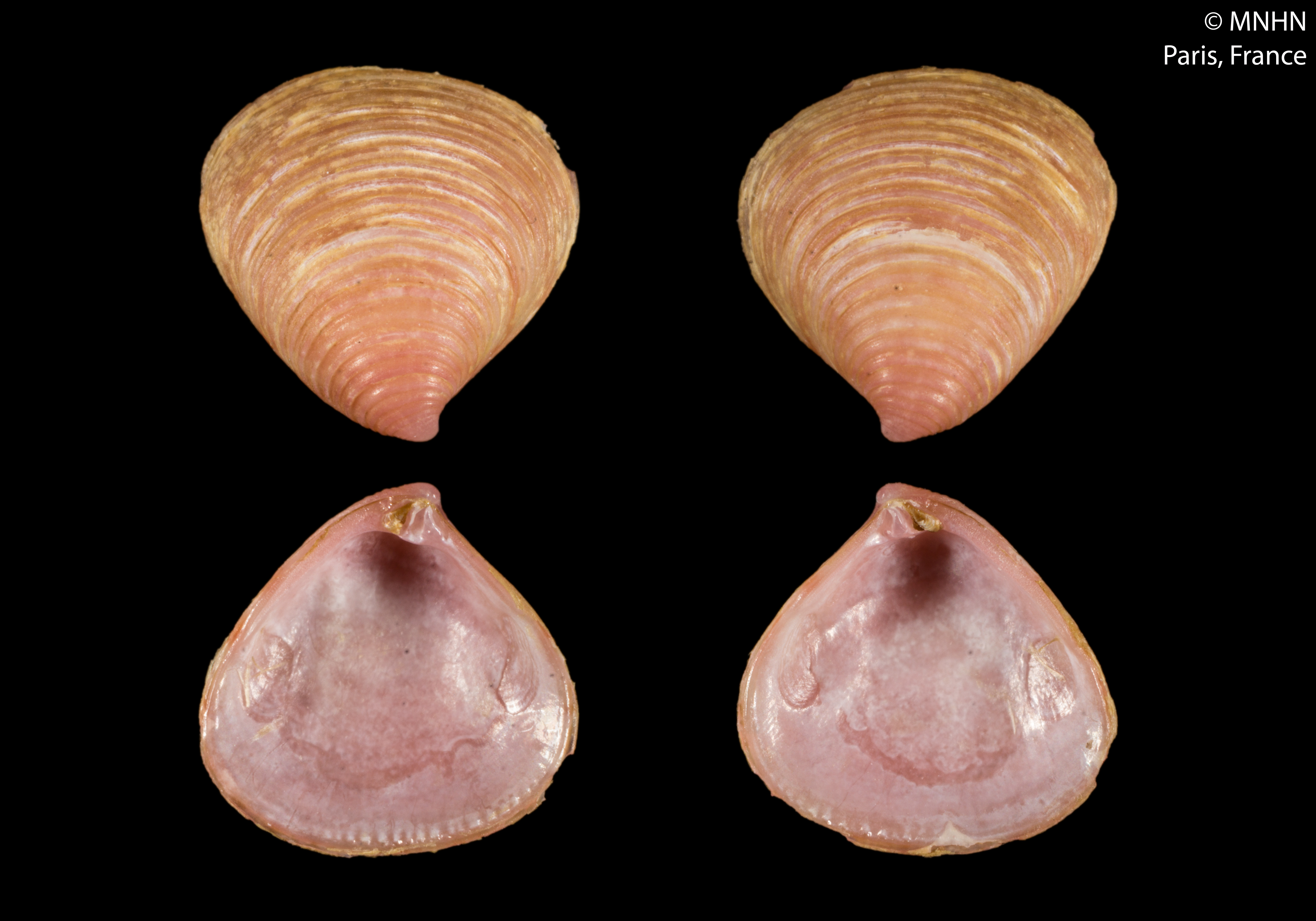
- Shell of Crassatina modesta (specimen at MNHN, Paris)

Scientific classification
- Kingdom: Animalia
- Phylum: Mollusca
- Class: Bivalvia
- Order: Carditida
- Superfamily: Crassatelloidea
- Family: Crassatellidae
- Genus: Crassatina; Kobelt, 1881

Synonyms
- Crassatina (Crassatina) Kobelt, 1881 · alternate representation; Crassatina (Scissulatina) M. Huber, 2010 · alternate representation

= Crassatina =

Genus of bivalves

Crassatina is a genus of saltwater clams, marine bivalve molluscs in the family Crassatellidae of the order Carditida.

== Species ==
- Crassatina alba Cosel, 1995
- Crassatina congoensis (Jaeckel & Thiele, 1931)
- Crassatina contraria (Gmelin, 1791)
- Crassatina corrugata (A. Adams & Reeve, 1850)
- Crassatina dakarensis Cosel, 1995
- Crassatina fusca (Kobelt, 1886)
- Crassatina guineensis Cosel & Gofas, 2018
- † Crassatina inornata Wild & L. C. King, 1932
- Crassatina marchadi Cosel, 1995
- Crassatina modesta (H. Adams, 1869)
- † Crassatina nummaria Powell, 1931
- Crassatina ornata (Gray in Griffith & Pidgeon, 1833)
- Crassatina paeteli (Maltzan, 1885)
- † Crassatina senecta Powell, 1931
- Crassatina triquetra (Reeve, 1842)

Synonyms

- Crassatina bellula (A. Adams, 1854): synonym of Talabrica bellula (A. Adams, 1854)
- Crassatina capensis (Lamy, 1917): synonym of Crassatella capensis Lamy, 1917
- Crassatina iredalei (Powell, 1958): synonym of Salaputium iredalei Powell, 1958
- Crassatina planata (Calcara, 1840): synonym of Crassatina modesta (H. Adams, 1869)
- Crassatina sowerbyi (Lamy, 1917): synonym of Crenocrassatella sowerbyi (Lamy, 1917)
- Crassatina suduirauti Lamprell, 2003: synonym of Chattina suduirauti (Lamprell, 2003) (original combination)
