= Longgang railway station =

Railway station in Houlong, Taiwan

Longgang Station 龍港車站
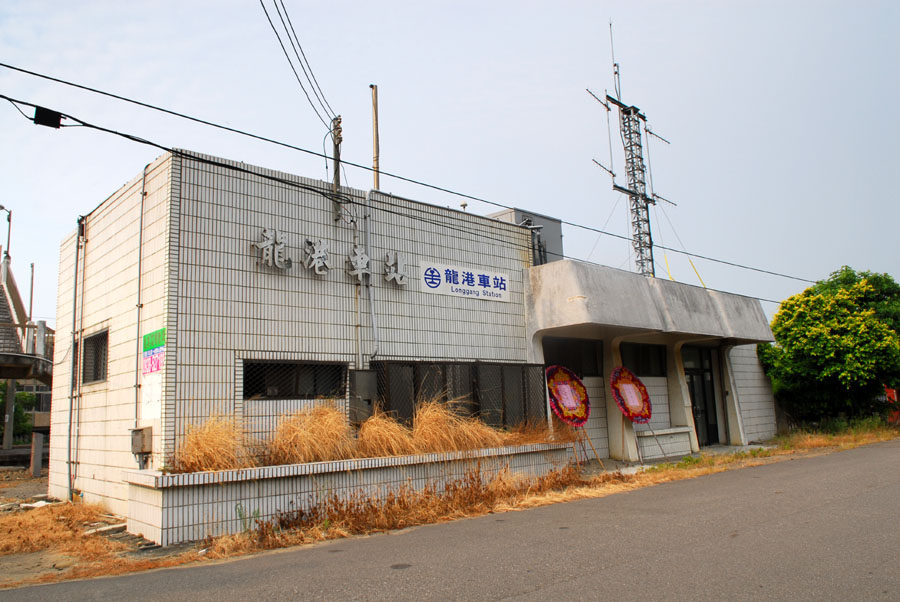

General information
- Location: Houlong, Miaoli County, Taiwan
- Coordinates: 24°36′41.2″N 120°45′30.7″E
- Owner: Taiwan Railway
- Operator: Taiwan Railway
- Line: Western Trunk line
- Train operators: Taiwan Railway

History
- Opened: 11 October 1922

Passengers
- 65 daily (2024)
Location

Longgang (Chinese: 龍港車站; pinyin: Lónggǎng Chēzhàn) is a railway station on Taiwan Railway West Coast line (Coastal line) located in Houlong Township, Miaoli County, Taiwan.

== History ==
The station was opened on 11 October 1922.

== Around the station ==
- Xihu Wetland

== See also ==
- List of railway stations in Taiwan

Preceding station	Taiwan Railway	Following station
Houlong towards Keelung	Western Trunk line	Baishatun towards Pingtung
