= Houlong =

Urban township in Miaoli County, Taiwan

Coordinates: 24°37′N 120°47′E

Houlong Township 後龍鎮 Houlung
- Urban township
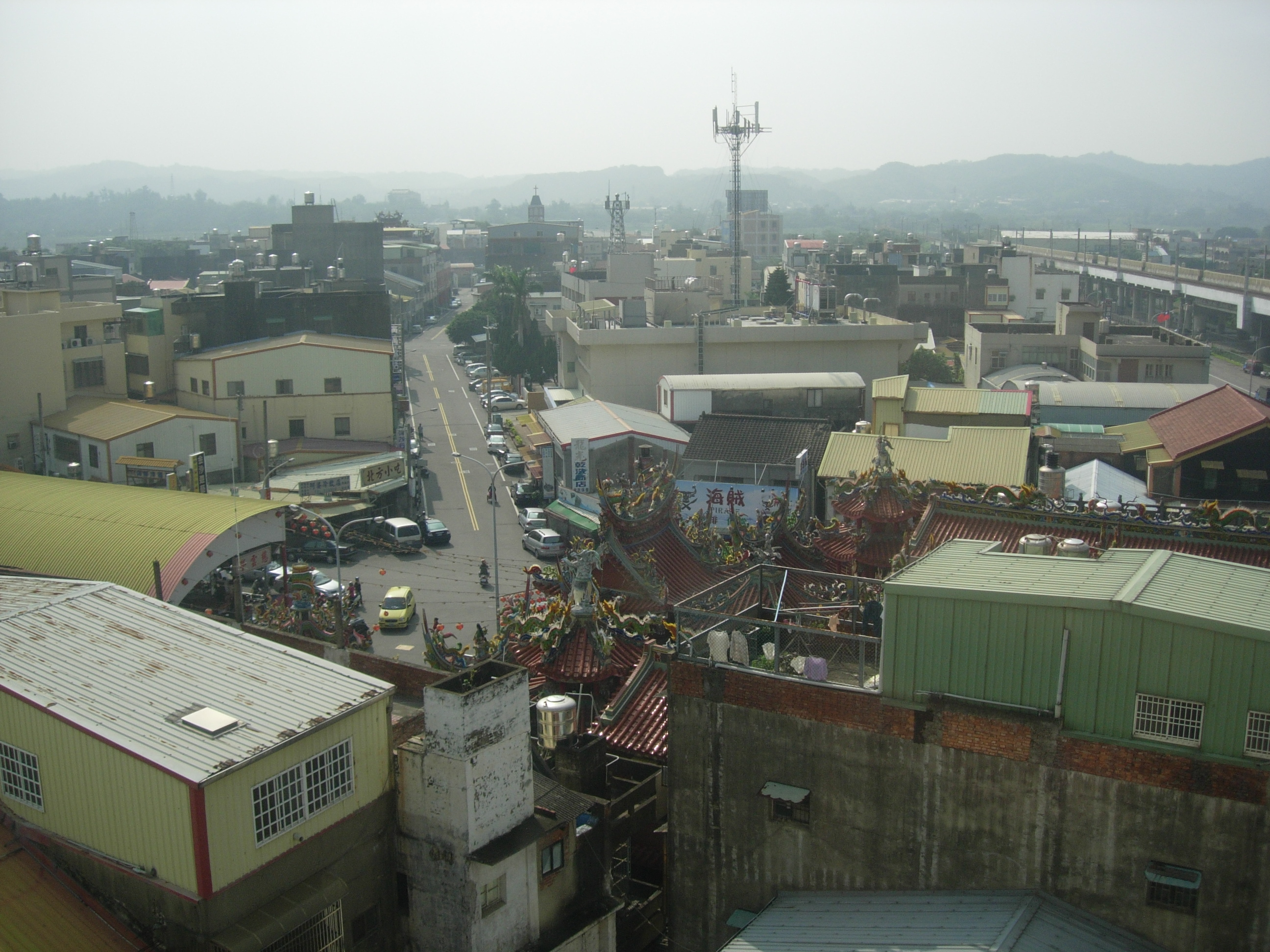

- Houlong Township in Miaoli County
- Location: Miaoli County, Taiwan

Area
  - Total: 75.81 km^{2} (29.27 sq mi)

Population (January 2023)
  - Total: 34,355
- Website: www.houlong.gov.tw (in Chinese)

Houlong Township
- Chinese: 後龍鎮
- Hanyu Pinyin: Hòulóng Zhèn
- Wade–Giles: Hou^{4}-lung^{2} Chen^{4}
- Pha̍k-fa-sṳ: Heu-liùng-chṳ́n
- Hokkien POJ: Āu-lâng-tìn

Houlong Township is an urban township in western Miaoli County, Taiwan. It is bordered by the Taiwan Strait on the west and Zaoqiao Township on the east. It lies at the mouth of the Houlong River. Miaoli HSR station is located in Houlong.

== Name ==
The township's name originates from that of a Taiwanese Plains Aborigines settlement. During the Kingdom of Tungning, the area was called Aulangsia (Chinese: 後壠社). Other variants of Aulang existed (e.g., Chinese: 凹浪/後壟; Pe̍h-ōe-jī: Āu-lâng). In 1920, during Japanese rule, the place was renamed Kōryū Village (Japanese: 後龍庄), under Chikunan District (竹南郡), Shinchiku Prefecture. This name closely matched the Japanese pronunciation of the previous names but with different kanji (Chinese characters). This written form was retained after the Kuomintang takeover of Taiwan in 1945; the characters are pronounced Hòulóng in Mandarin Chinese. The Taiwanese Hokkien pronunciation remains Āu-lâng, based on the pre-1920 name.

== Geography ==
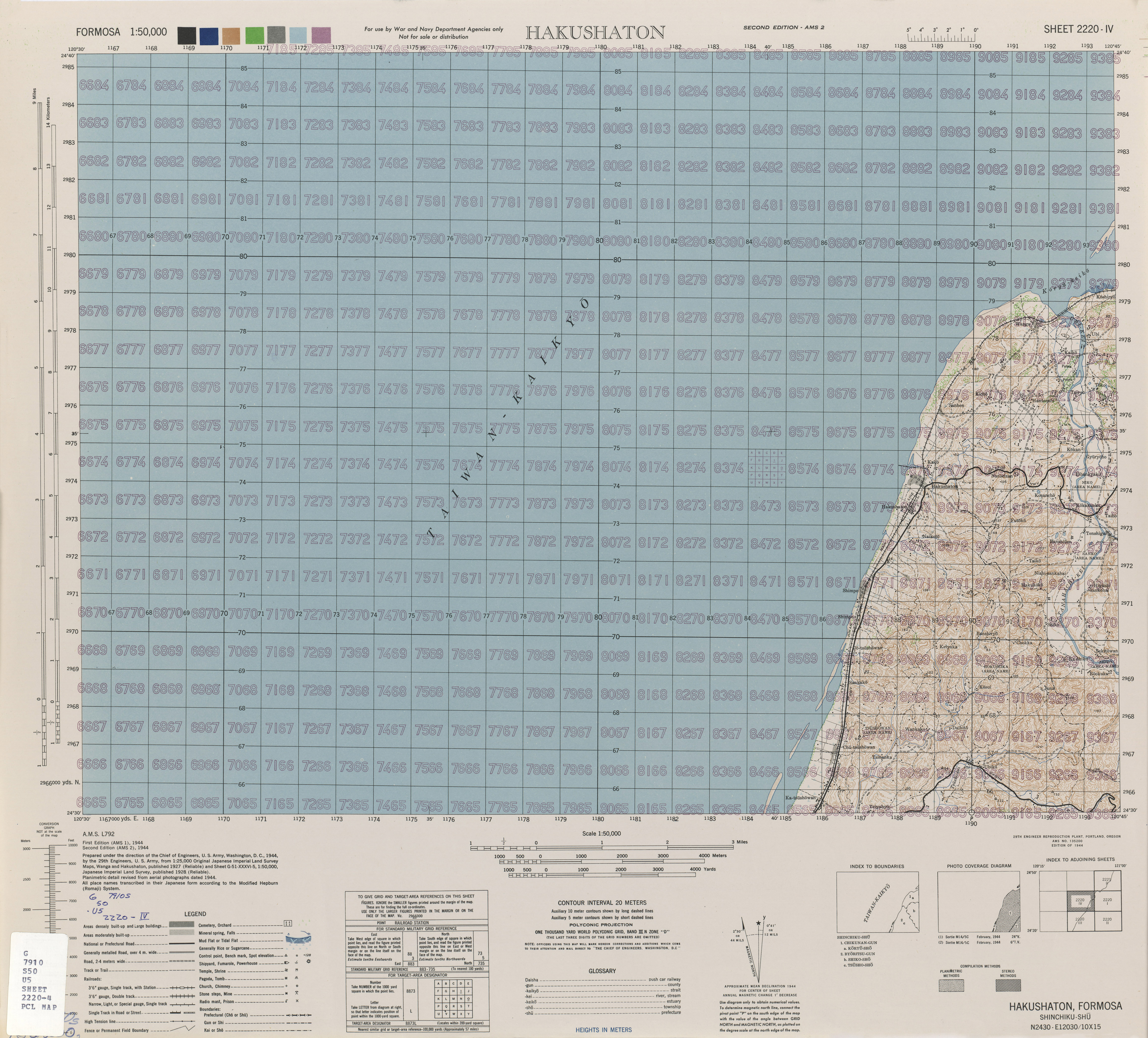
Map of western Houlong area (1944)

- Area: 75.81 square kilometres (29.27 sq mi)
- Population: 34,355 (January 2023 estimate)

It lies at the mouth of the Houlong River.

== Administrative divisions ==
The township comprises 23 villages: Beilong, Dashan, Dazhuang, Dongming, Fengfu, Funing, Fuxing, Haibao, Haipu, Jiaoyi, Longjin, Longkeng, Nangang, Nanlong, Puding, Shuiwei, Waipu, Wanbao, Xinmin, Xiushui, Xizhou, Zhonghe and Zhonglong.

== Politics ==
The township is part of Miaoli County Constituency I electoral district for Legislative Yuan.

== Education ==
- Jen-Teh Junior College of Medicine, Nursing and Management

== Tourist attractions ==
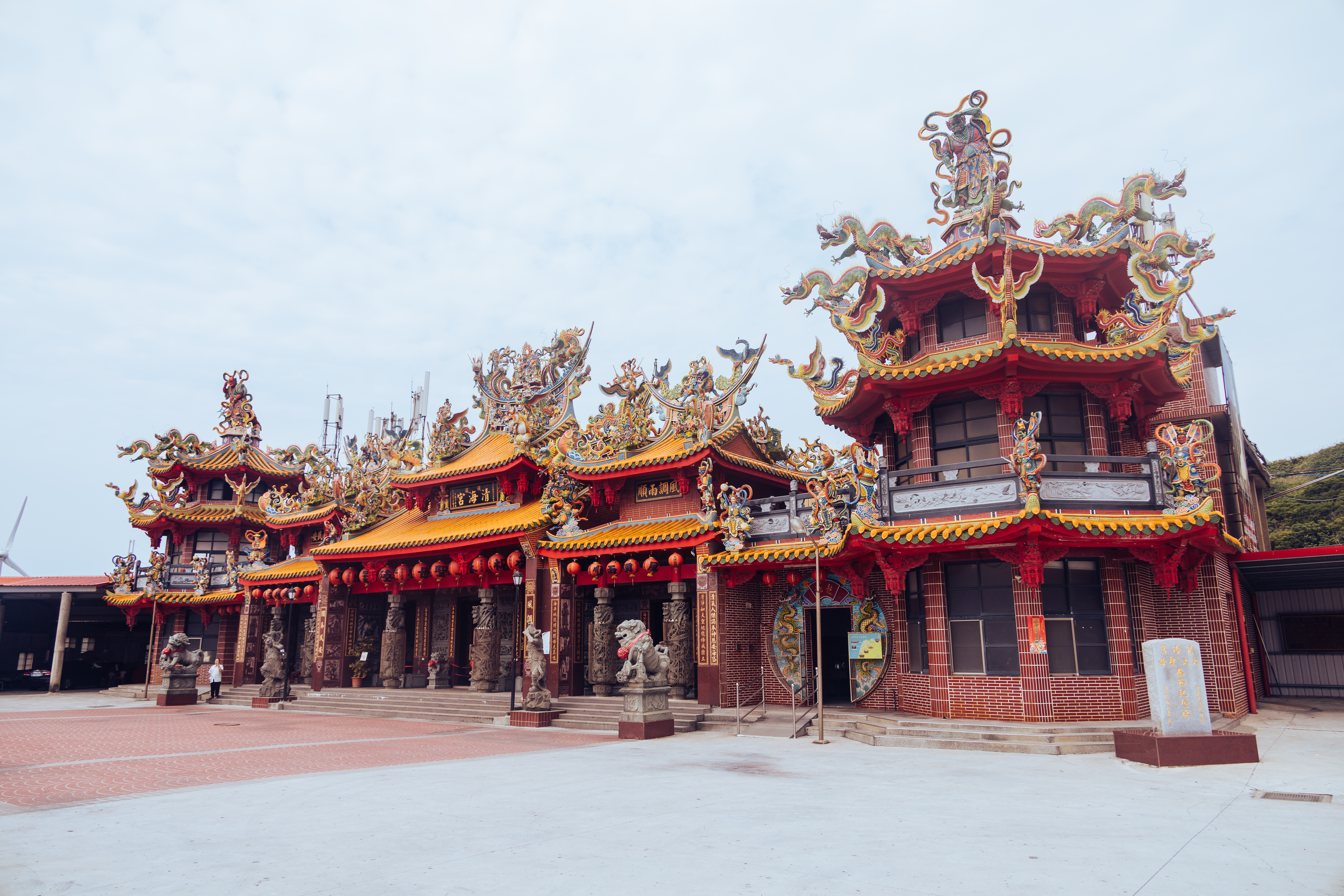
Chinghai Temple

- Ciyun Temple
- Chinghai Temple
- Guogang Shell Fossils
- Hakka Round House
- Haowangjiao
- Houlong Art House
- Maling Temple
- Waipu Fishing Port
- Xihu Wetland
- Yingtsai Academy

== Transportation ==
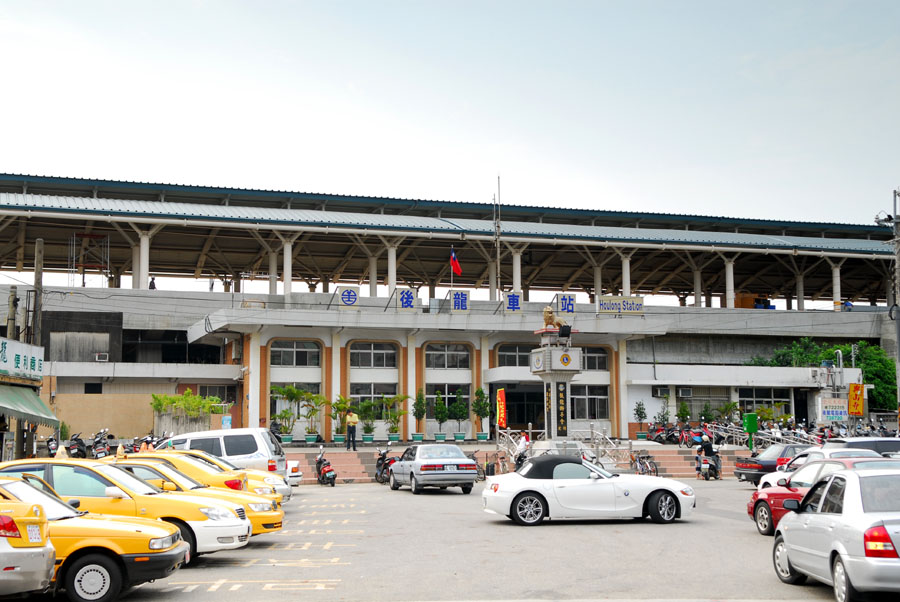
TRA Houlong Station

Houlong Township is accessible from Dashan Station, Houlong Station, Longgang Station and Fengfu Station of Taiwan Railway. Taiwan High Speed Rail has one station in the township, which is Miaoli Station.

== Notable natives ==
- Liu Cheng-hung, Magistrate of Miaoli County (2005–2014)
