= Miaoli HSR station =

Railway station in Miaoli, Taiwan

Miaoli 苗栗
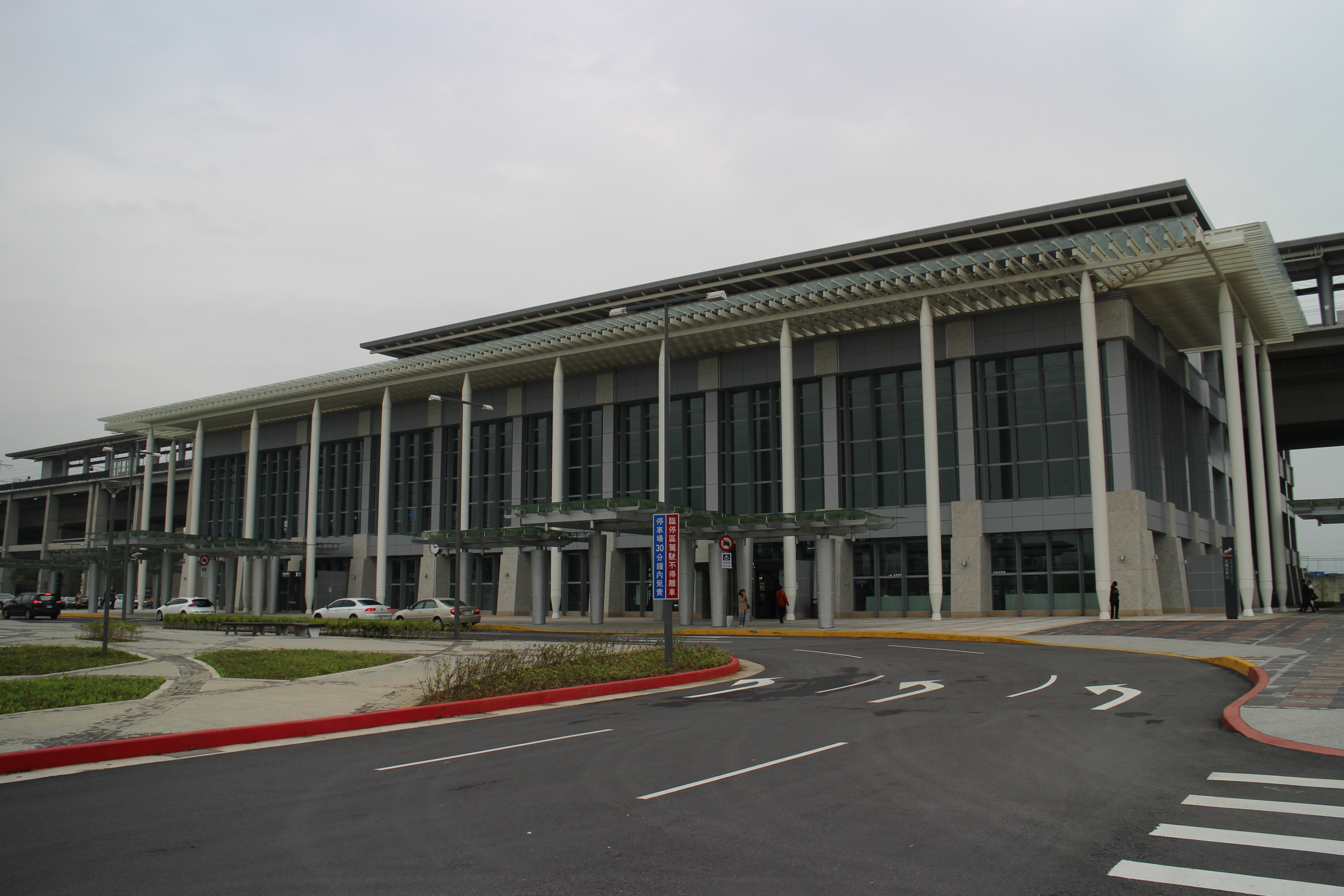
- Station exterior

Chinese name
- Traditional Chinese: 苗栗
Transcriptions
Standard Mandarin
- Hanyu Pinyin: Miáolì
- Bopomofo: ㄇㄧㄠˊ ㄌㄧˋ
Hakka
- Romanization: Měu-lid (Sixian dialect); Miau-lìd (Hailu dialect)
Southern Min
- Tâi-lô: Biâu-li̍k; Miâu-li̍k

General information
- Location: 268 Gaotie 3rd Rd; Houlong, Miaoli County; Taiwan
- Coordinates: 24.6058°N 120.8253°E
- System: THSR railway station
- Line: THSR
- Distance: 104.7 km
- Connections: Conventional rail; Coach

Construction
- Structure type: Elevated
- Architect: Kris Yao

Other information
- Station code: MIL／06
- Website: www.thsrc.com.tw/en/StationInfo/Prospect/6a3f270b-4e3e-4b11-96cd-cbfbc03da5fc

History
- Opened: 2015-12-01

Passengers
- 2018: 1.702 million per year ▲14.62%
- Rank: 11 out of 12

Services
Preceding station	Taiwan High Speed Rail	Following station
Hsinchu towards Nangang	THSR	Taichung towards Zuoying
Preceding station	Taiwan Railway	Following station
Zaoqiao towards Keelung	Western Trunk line transfer at Fengfu	Miaoli towards Kaohsiung
Location
- Location within Taiwan

Miaoli (Chinese: 苗栗; pinyin: Miáolì) is a railway station in Miaoli County, Taiwan served by Taiwan High Speed Rail. Transfers to Fengfu railway station can be made at this station, which links to Miaoli railway station located in Miaoli City.

== Overview ==
Due to funding problems, Miaoli Station was not constructed when Taiwan High Speed Rail first opened for service in 2007, and the detailed design began in 2010. Construction began on 28 January 2013, and the station opened on 1 December 2015.

The station consists of one elevated main station and two side platforms.

Availability of high speed rail reduced travel time between Miaoli County and Taipei City to 43-49 minutes.

To allow transfers to TRA, Fengfu railway station was moved approximately 400 meters north of its original location on 10 September 2016 to connect with the HSR station.

== Station layout ==
4F
4F	Side platform
4F	Platform 1	THSR toward Nangang (Hsinchu)
4F	Platform 2	THSR toward Zuoying (Taichung)
4F	Side platform

2F	Connecting level	Faregates, waiting area, nursery

Street level	Concourse	Entrance/exit, ticketing, automatic ticket machines, restrooms, information desk Tourism counter, stores Parking lot, transfer station, taxi stand, drop-off area

== HSR services ==
The station is only served by trains which stop at all stations. It is normally served by 8xx trains which stop at all stations on the Taiwan High Speed Rail, and occasionally served by (1)5xx trains (Note: except 583 and 598) which depart/terminate at Taichung HSR station.

== Around the station ==
- Hakka Round House
- Yingtsai Academy
- Taiwan Railway Fengfu Station

== See also ==
- List of railway stations in Taiwan
