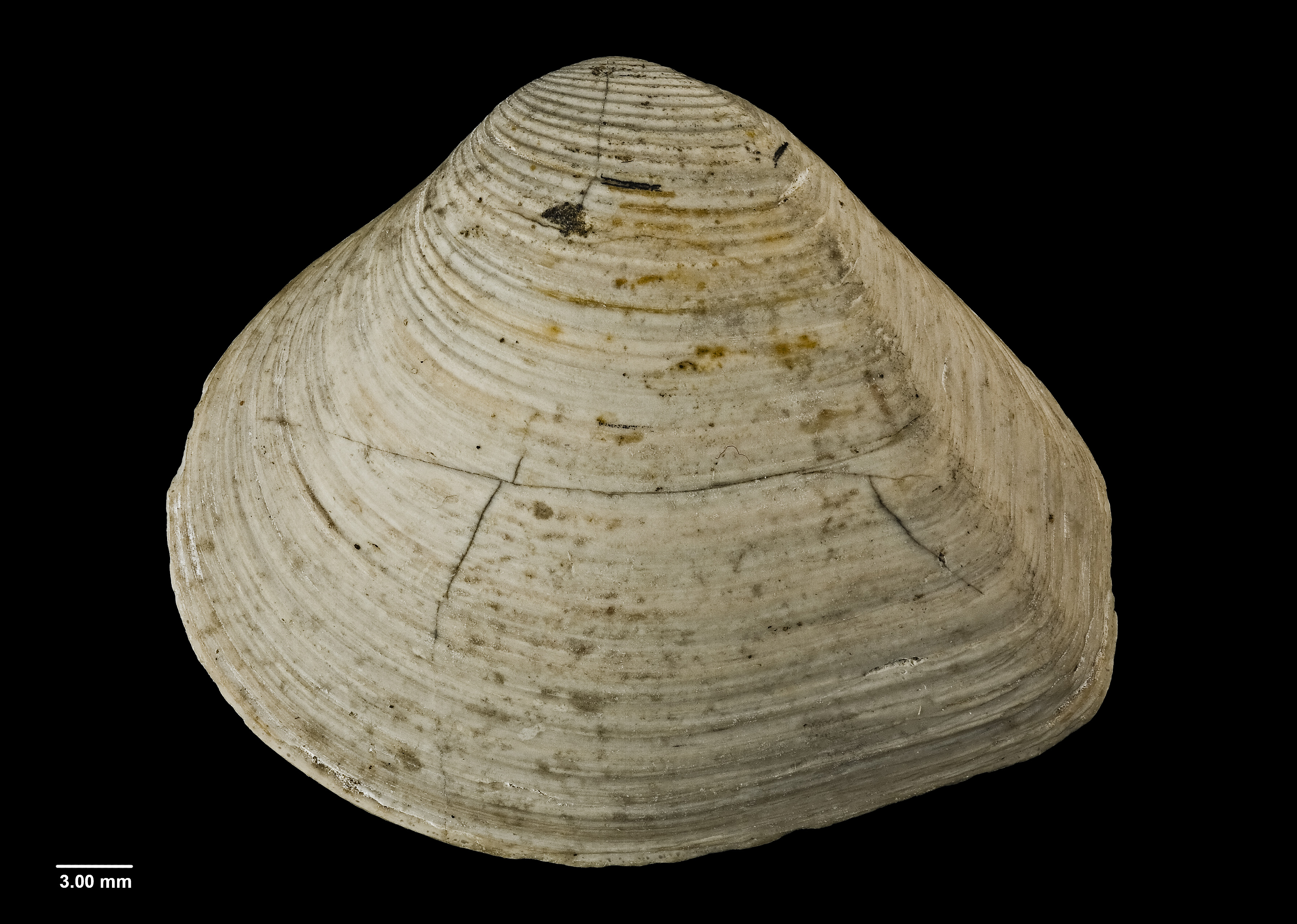
- Eucrassatella scopalveus

Scientific classification
- Kingdom: Animalia
- Phylum: Mollusca
- Class: Bivalvia
- Order: Carditida
- Family: Crassatellidae
- Subfamily: Crassatellinae
- Genus: Eucrassatella; Iredale, 1924

Type species
- Crassatella kingicola Lamarck, 1805

Synonyms
- Eucrassinella Cruz, 1980

= Eucrassatella =

Eucrassatella Temporal range: Oligocene–Recent

Genus of bivalves

Eucrassatella is a genus of marine bivalve molluscs of the family Crassatellidae. Members of the genus are found in the waters of Australia and New Zealand.

== Description ==
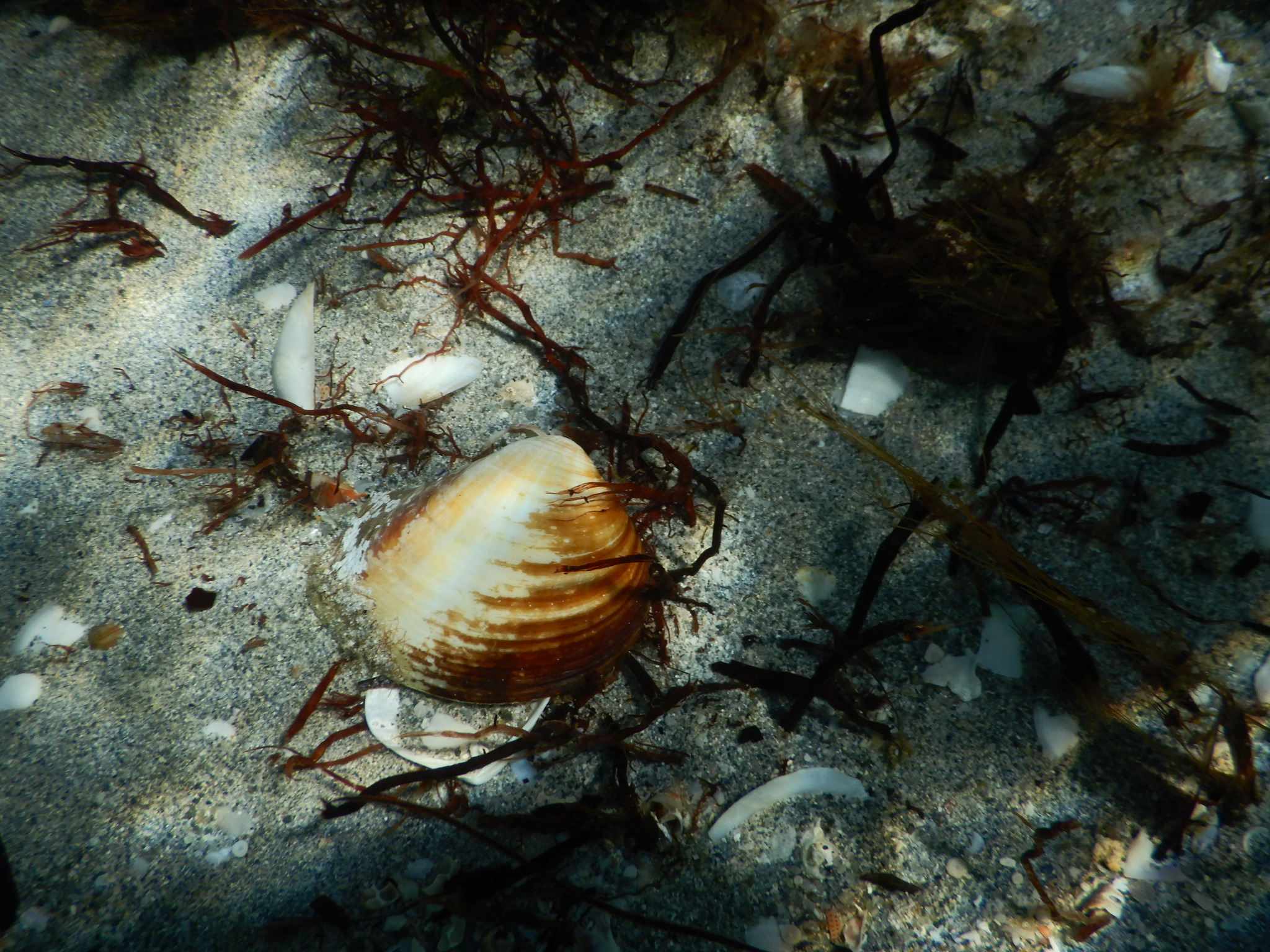
Eucrassatella donacina

Members of Eucrassatella have a thick and elongated shell, with well-developed triangular-shaped cardinal teeth, smooth valve margins, ribbed commarginal sculpture and adductor muscle scars which are deeply impressed.

== Taxonomy ==
The genus was first described in 1924 by Tom Iredale.

== Distribution ==
Eurytellina is found in the waters of Australia and New Zealand. The earliest fossils date to the Oligocene.

== Species ==
Species within the genus Eucrassatella include:

- †Eucrassatella ampla (Zittel, 1865)
- †Eucrassatella camura (Pritchard, 1903)
- Eucrassatella corbuloides (Reeve, 1842)
- Eucrassatella cumingii (A. Adams, 1854)
- Eucrassatella decipiens (Reeve, 1842)
- †Eucrassatella deltoides Darragh, 1965
- Eucrassatella donacina (Lamarck, 1818)
- †Eucrassatella dorsennata Darragh, 1965
- †Eucrassatella eupontica Darragh, 1965
- Eucrassatella kingicola (Lamarck, 1805)
- †Eucrassatella kingicoloides (Pritchard, 1903)
- †Eucrassatella marshalli A. W. B. Powell, 1931
- †Eucrassatella memanae Darragh, 1965
- †Eucrassatella meridionalis (Dall, 1903)
- †Eucrassatella oblonga (Tenison Woods, 1876)
- Eucrassatella pulchra (Reeve, 1842)
- †Eucrassatella rosicollina Darragh, 1965
- †Eucrassatella scopalveus (Finlay, 1926)
- †Eucrassatella subobesa (P. Marshall & Murdoch, 1919)
- †Eucrassatella wilckensi (Medina & Rinaldi, 1978)
