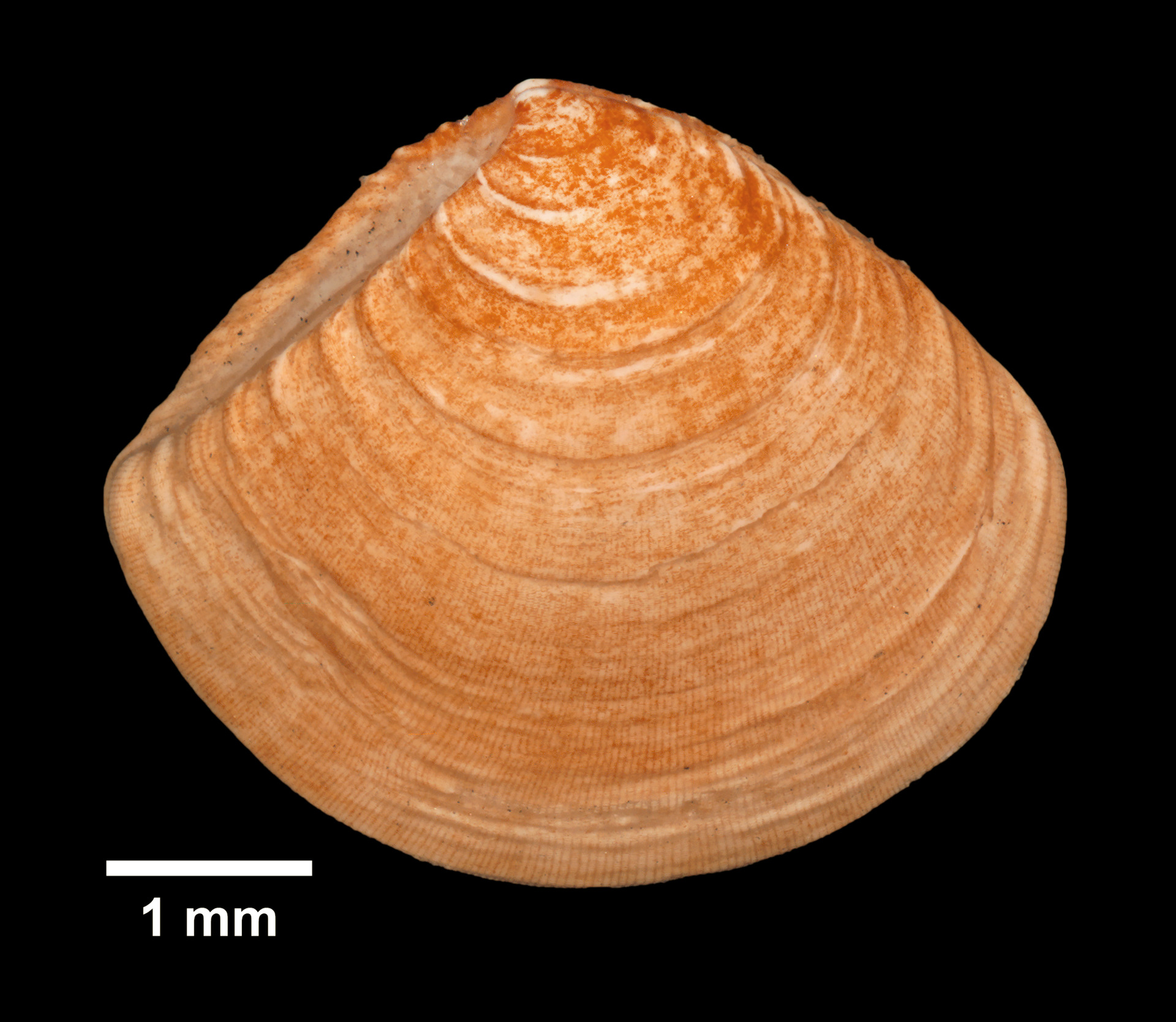
- Crassinella lunulata

Scientific classification
- Kingdom: Animalia
- Phylum: Mollusca
- Class: Bivalvia
- Order: Carditida
- Superfamily: Crassatelloidea
- Family: Crassatellidae; Ferussac, 1822

Genera
- See text

= Crassatellidae =

Family of bivalves

Crassatellidae is a family of small saltwater clams, marine bivalve molluscs of the order Carditida.

== Genera and species ==
Genera and species in Crassatellidae include:

- † Anthonya Gabb, 1864
- Bathytormus Stewart, 1930
- Chattina M. Huber, 2010
- † Chattonia Marwick, 1929
- Crassasulca H. E. Vokes, 1988
- Crassatella Lamarck, 1799
  - Crassatella ponderosa Gmelin, 1791
- Crassatina Kobelt, 1881
- Crassinella Guppy, 1874
  - Crassinella dupliniana (Dall, 1903)
  - Crassinella lunulata (Conrad, 1834) – lunate crassinella
  - Crassinella martinicensis (d'Orbigny, 1842)
- Crenocrassatella Habe, 1951
- Elsius M. Huber, 2015
- Eucrassatella Iredale, 1924
  - Eucrassatella fluctuata (Carpenter, 1864)
  - Eucrassatella kingicola (Lamarck, 1805) – thickshell clam
- Fluctiger Iredale, 1924
- Hybolophus Stewart, 1930
- Indocrassatella Chavan, 1952
- Kalolophus DeVries, 2016
  - Kalolophus antillarum (Reeve, 1842)
  - Kalolophus chipolanus (Dall, 1903)
  - Kalolophus speciosus (A. Adams, 1854)
- Nipponocrassatella Kuroda & Habe, 1971
- Salaputium Iredale, 1924
- † Seendia R. Casey, 1961
- † Spissatella Finlay, 1926
- Talabrica Iredale, 1924
  - Talabrica bellula (A. Adams, 1854)
- † Tilicrassatella DeVries, 2016
- † Triplicitella K. S. Collins, Crampton & M. Hannah, 2015
