= ICC Tainan =

Convention center in Gueiren, Tainan, Taiwan

ICC Tainan 大臺南會展中心
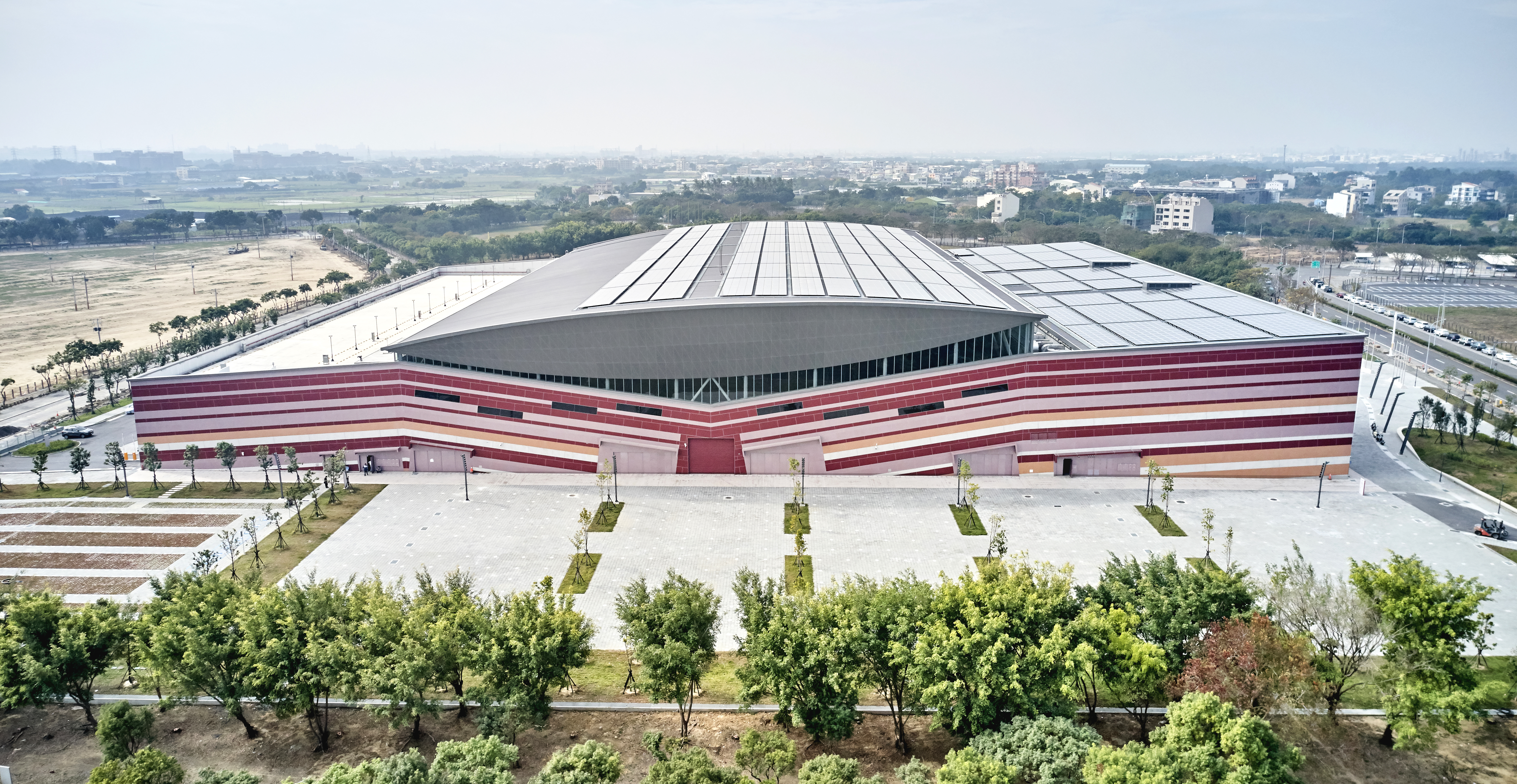
- Interactive map of ICC Tainan 大臺南會展中心
- Address: No. 3, Guiren 12th Road, Gueiren, Tainan, Taiwan
- Coordinates: 22°55′16.7″N 120°17′7.4″E
- Owner: International Trade Administration (Taiwan)
- Type: convention center
- Public transit: Tainan HSR Station
- Parking: 500 (indoor); 464 (outdoor)

Construction
- Opened: 21 April 2022
- Cost: NT$ 1.8 billion

Website
- Official website

International Convention Centre Tainan (ICC Tainan; traditional Chinese: 大臺南會展中心; simplified Chinese: 大台南会展中心; pinyin: Dà Táinán Huìzhǎn Zhōngxīn) is a convention center in Gueiren District, Tainan, Taiwan. It hosted many major events for Tainan, including the 2023 National Games and the 2024 Taiwan Lantern Festival.

== History ==
Before 2010, Tainan City Government originally planned to build Tainan Arena in the suburbs of southern Tainan. However, due to opposition regarding issues on traffic and safety, the project was suspended.

After the merger between Tainan County and Tainan City in 2010, the Tainan City government expressed interest in constructing and operating its own convention center. They evaluated that this would have a greater economic benefit to the city than the previously proposed Tainan Arena.

At that time, there was only one convention center in Tainan, which was the Commercial Exhibition Center Tainan (Chinese: 南紡世貿展覽中心). This convention center was a joint venture between two private companies, Want Want China Time Media Group and Tainan Spinning Co. Ltd.

In August 2015, the Executive Yuan approved the construction of Greater Tainan Expo & Convention Center, with an initial budget of $2 billion NTD. It was later renamed to Greater Tainan Convention and Exhibition Center. The construction of the convention center started on 8 May 2018. The project was designed by King Shih Architects.

The construction was completed on 30 September 2021 and was renamed to ICC Tainan. The site was then handed over to the International Trade Administration of the Ministry of Economic Affairs, which was subsequently inaugurated on 21 April 2022. Following the inauguration, the Commercial Exhibition Center Tainan was closed down.

On 7 December 2023, ICC Tainan and four other regional convention centers in southeast Asia formed the Asia Venue Alliance (AVA), which is a strategic partnership that aims to foster collaboration and brand recognition. The other four convention centers are Ariyana Convention Centre Danang of Vietnam, Bali Nusa Dua Convention Centre of Indonesia and the Borneo Convention Centre Kuching and Setia SPICE Convention Centre of Malaysia.

== Architecture ==
The convention center has a spacious entry plaza to its north, and a larger plaza to the east for outdoor events. The rectangular building includes a lobby adjoined to conference rooms of differing sizes. The building also includes an exhibition hall and an indoor parking/service area.

The exterior of the building has a brick-like color scheme, which evokes Tainan's Fort Zeelandia and Fort Provintia and their brick walls. The inspiration taken from these ancient forts originally built by Dutch East India Company echoes with the era when Tainan once was the capital for international trade in Taiwan. The brick design then smoothly integrates with the interior, which has a modern, high-tech aesthetic.

The exhibition hall has a high ceiling design with lightweight, bow-shaped tension truss that spans 81 meters across the hall. The design represents the concept of "Kunsheng" (Chinese: 鯤鯓), a mythical creature that resembles a whale, and often mentioned in folklores of Tainan. The historic ties between "Kunsheng" and Tainan are significant, as several places in Tainan are named after it, such as Nankunshen and Qingkunshen.

=== Sustainability ===
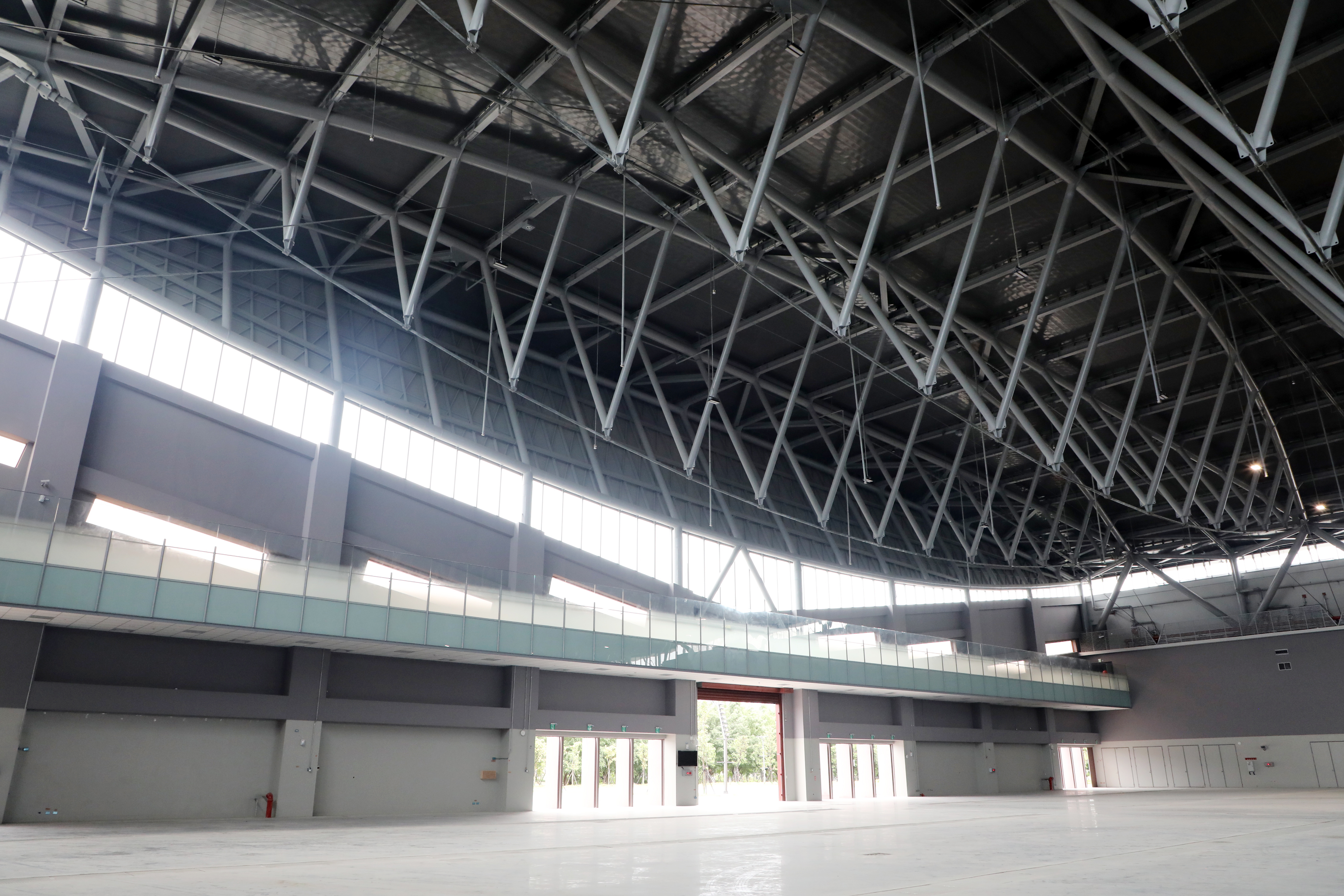
Roof trusses of the exhibition hall

The exhibition hall is the first building in Taiwan to use lightweight, bow-shaped tension truss for its roof. This design reduced the amount of steel used by 420 tons, which is 20 percent less than a traditional design. This effectively reduced the carbon emissions by 777 tons, which equates to the amount that 35,000 trees absorb every year.

The high ceiling design of the exhibition hall also provides ample space near the ceiling for storing heat, hence allowing the space near the floor to remain cool. This then allows the air-conditioning system to target only up to 6 meters in height, reducing its electricity consumption by 35 percent.

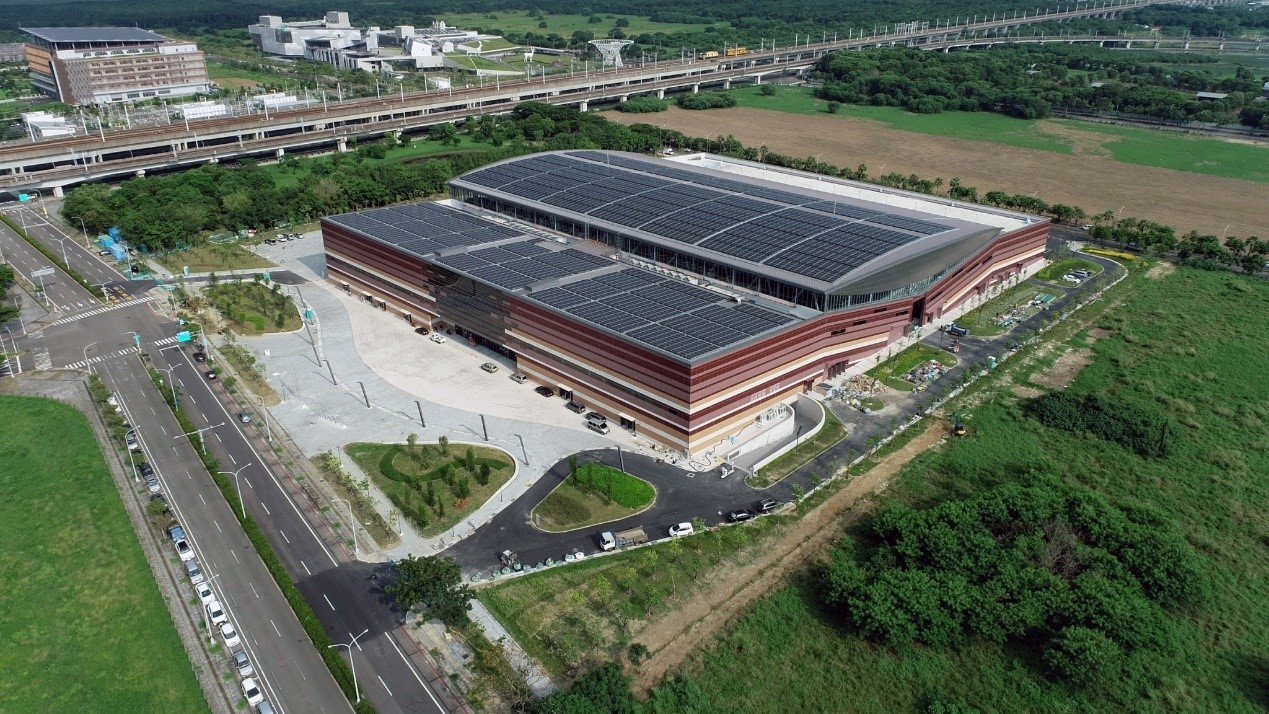
Solar panels on the roof of ICC Tainan

Solar panels were installed on the roof of the exhibition hall and the conference building, with the 5,348 panels generating around 1.658 MWh of electricity. This equates to 30 percent of the electricity used by the convention center, or the electricity consumed by 1,318 homes.

The project also planted 308 trees, 1375 m^{2} of bushes and 8385 m^{2} of grass in the site of the convention center. These plants belongs to a wide range of species, 77 percent of which are species native to Tainan or Taiwan. In total, the plants provide a carbon storage of 7,060 tons.

The convention building has received ISO 20121 certification. It also received Silver Level of "Green Building Label" and "Intelligent Building Label", both were issued by the Taiwan Architecture & Building Center.

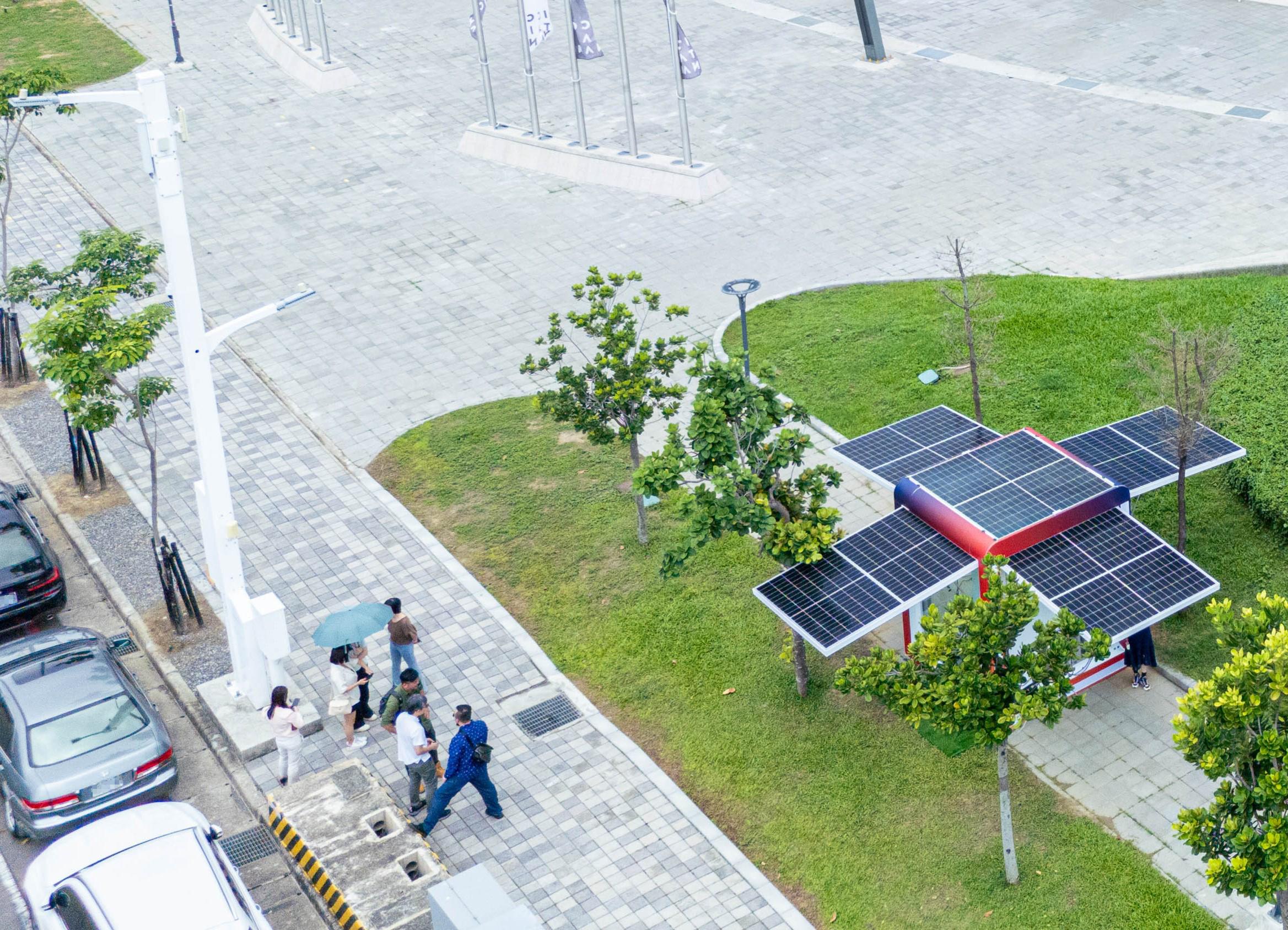
Smart streetlight system at ICC Tainan

In 2024, the country's first "smart" streetlight, entirely powered by renewable energy, was installed in the plaza of the convention center. It is powered by solar energy and has a battery with a capacity of 40 kW. The "smart" streetlight also provides public Wi-Fi, air quality sensors, traffic monitoring devices and public transport trackers.

=== Public artworks ===
There are two public artworks in the North Plaza. They were created by Spanish artist Juanjo Novella in 2021, using laser-cut carbon steel. The two artworks are as follows:

- Tainan Sea Gate — inspired by the coral reefs in the Pacific Ocean, the artwork is presented as a gate that invites visitors into the convention center. It also pays tribute to the maritime history of the city of Tainan.
- Nature Spreads — inspired by the Anping Tree House, a symbolic landmark of Tainan. The artwork depicts a lush forest but the outline of a face of a child can be seen within the artwork.

In 2022, Tainan Sea Gate and Nature Spreads received a Merit Award for the International CODAawards in the Institutional Art category.

=== Awards ===
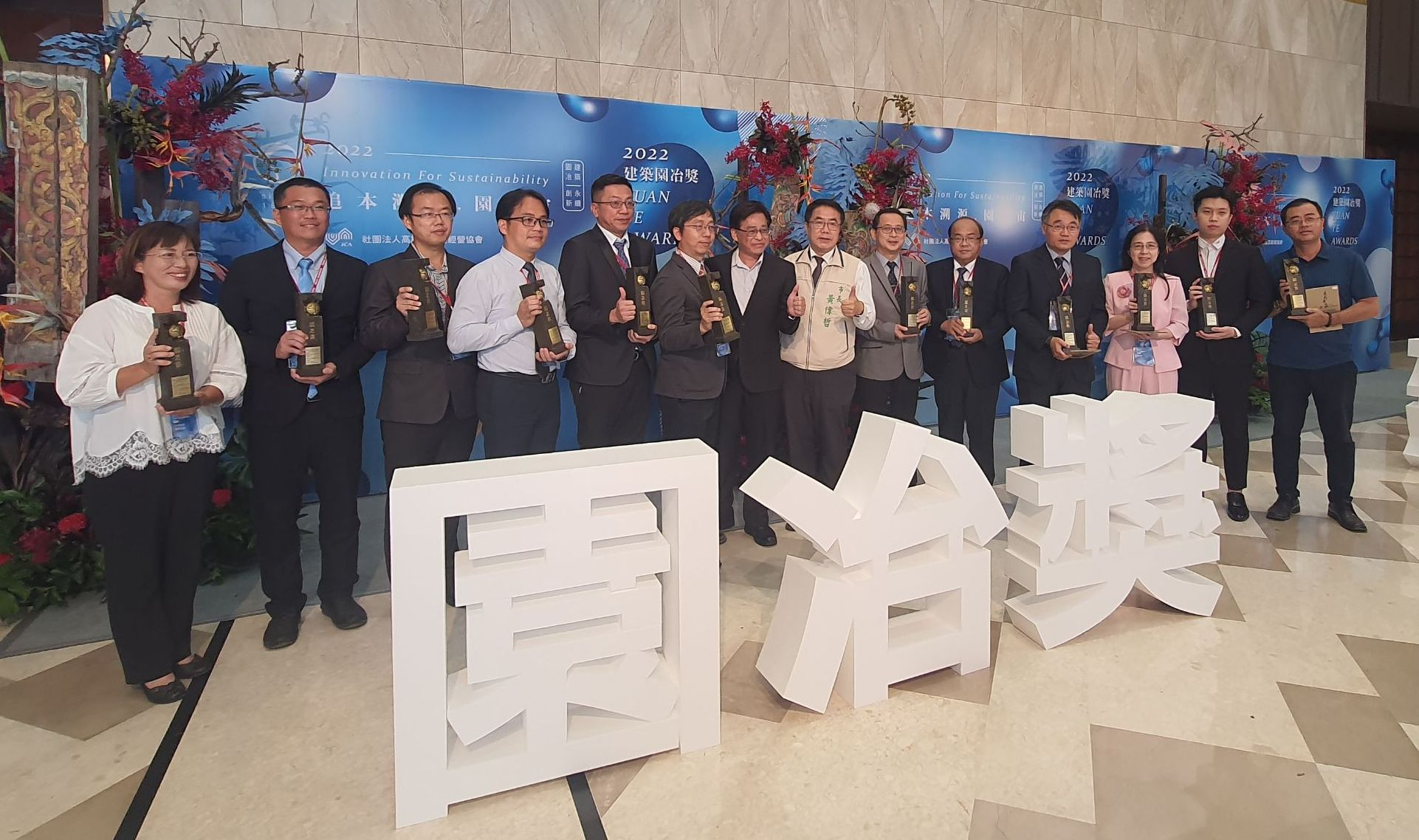
Tainan City Government at the 2022 Yuan Ye Awards

- 2019 FIABCI Taiwan Real Estate Excellence Award — Special Award for Best Planning and Design
- 2021 Tainan City Government Public Works Quality Award — Special Merit
- 2021 Public Works Gold Quality Award from Public Construction Commission
- 2022 Yuan Ye Awards for Tainan City Public Landscape
- 2023 Outstanding Engineering Award (Chinese: 工程優良獎) from Chinese Institute of Engineers (CIE)

== Facilities ==
The main exhibition hall can held up to 600 standard-sized booths, or 10,000 people. Located next to it is a smaller exhibition hall named North Exhibition Hall. It is equipped with a kitchen and is used for special exhibitions and catering events. There are 10 conference rooms in different sizes, each have been given a historic name related to Tainan.

=== Tayouan ===
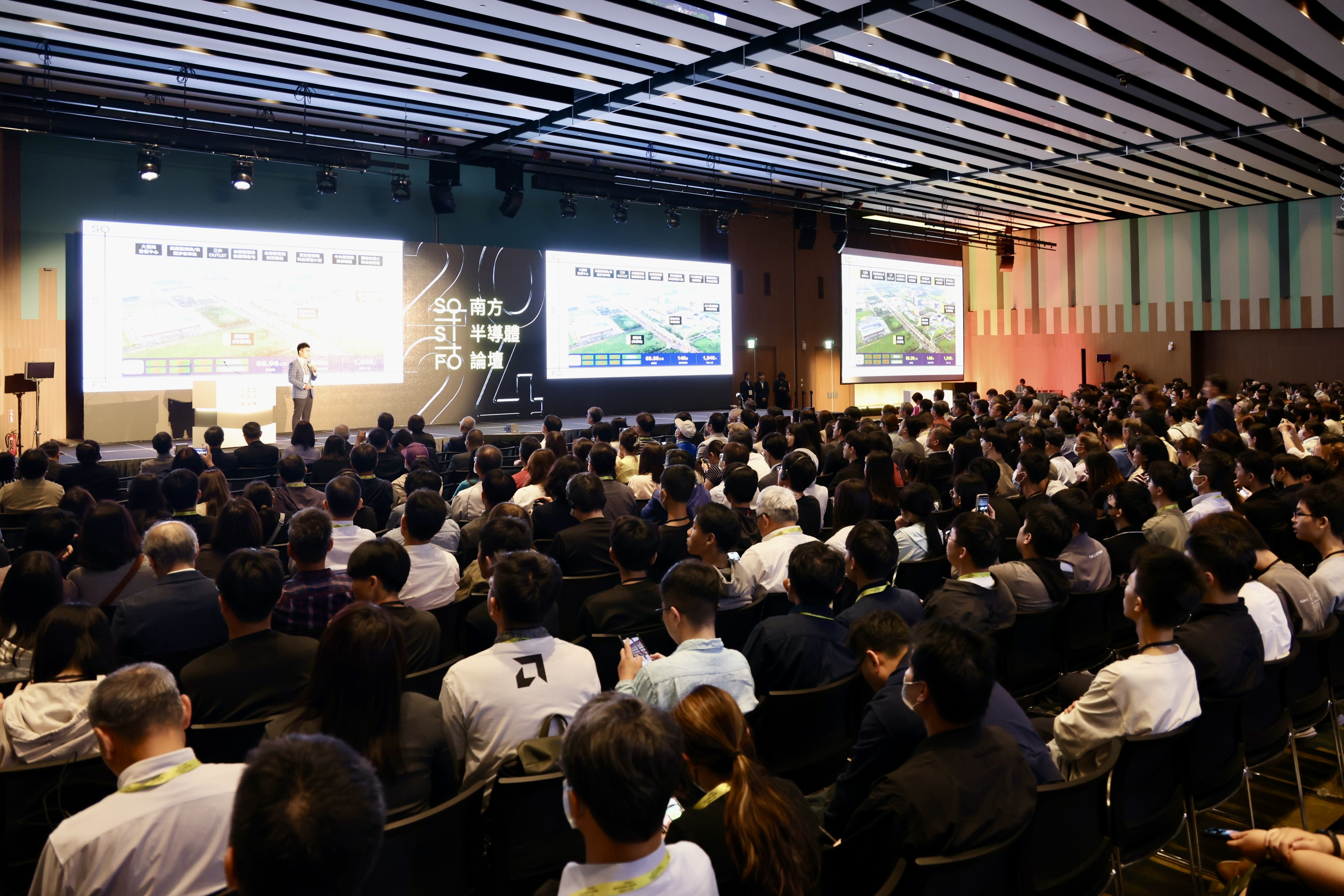
2024 Southern Semiconductor Forum in Tayouan

Located on the third floor, it is the largest conference room in the convention center, with a capacity of 1,000 people.

Tayouan is the Dutch translation of the name for the bay near modern-day Anping of Tainan, named by the first Dutch settlers. The name "Taiwan" was later derived from this word. This name was given to the largest conference room to symbolize the historical significance of Tainan as a trading hub.

=== Zeelandia ===
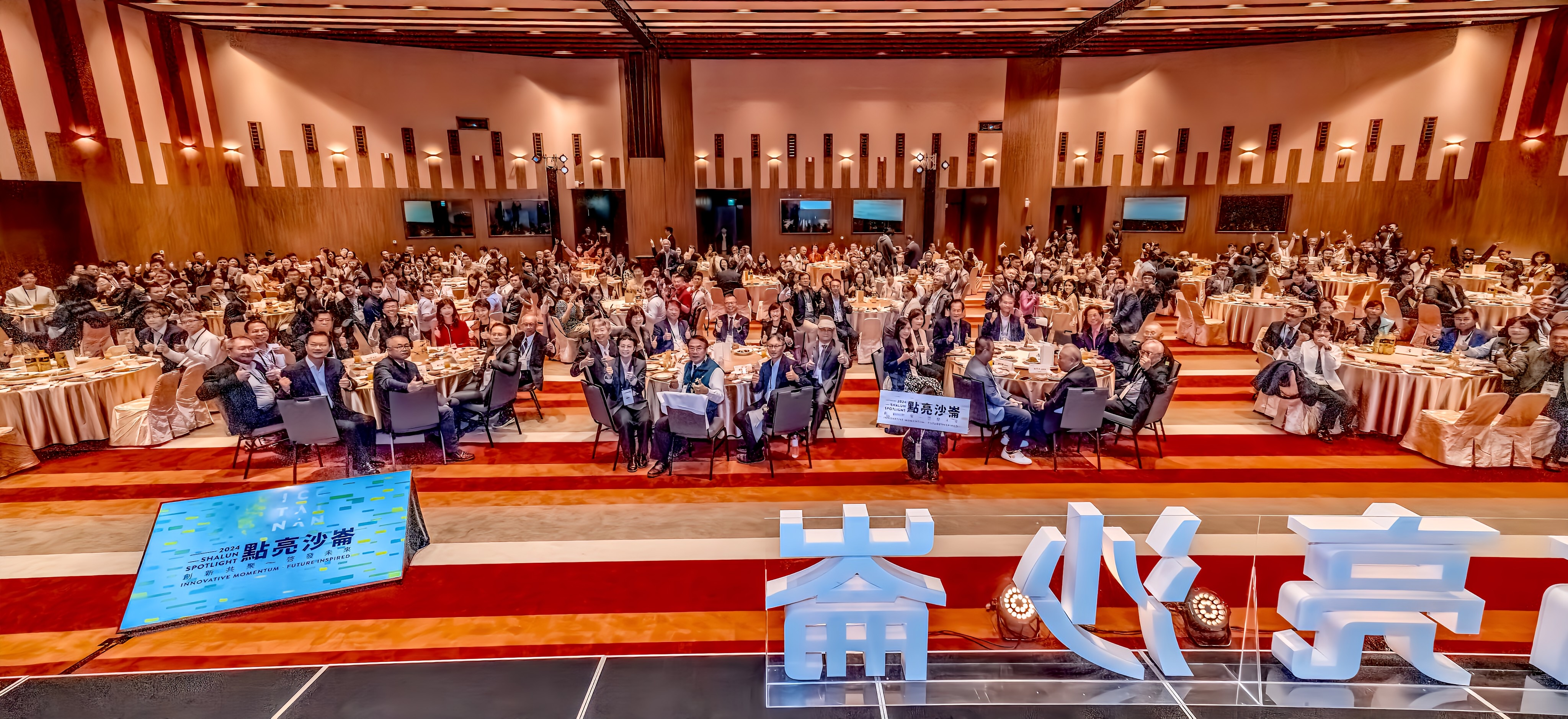
Dinner event in Zeelandia

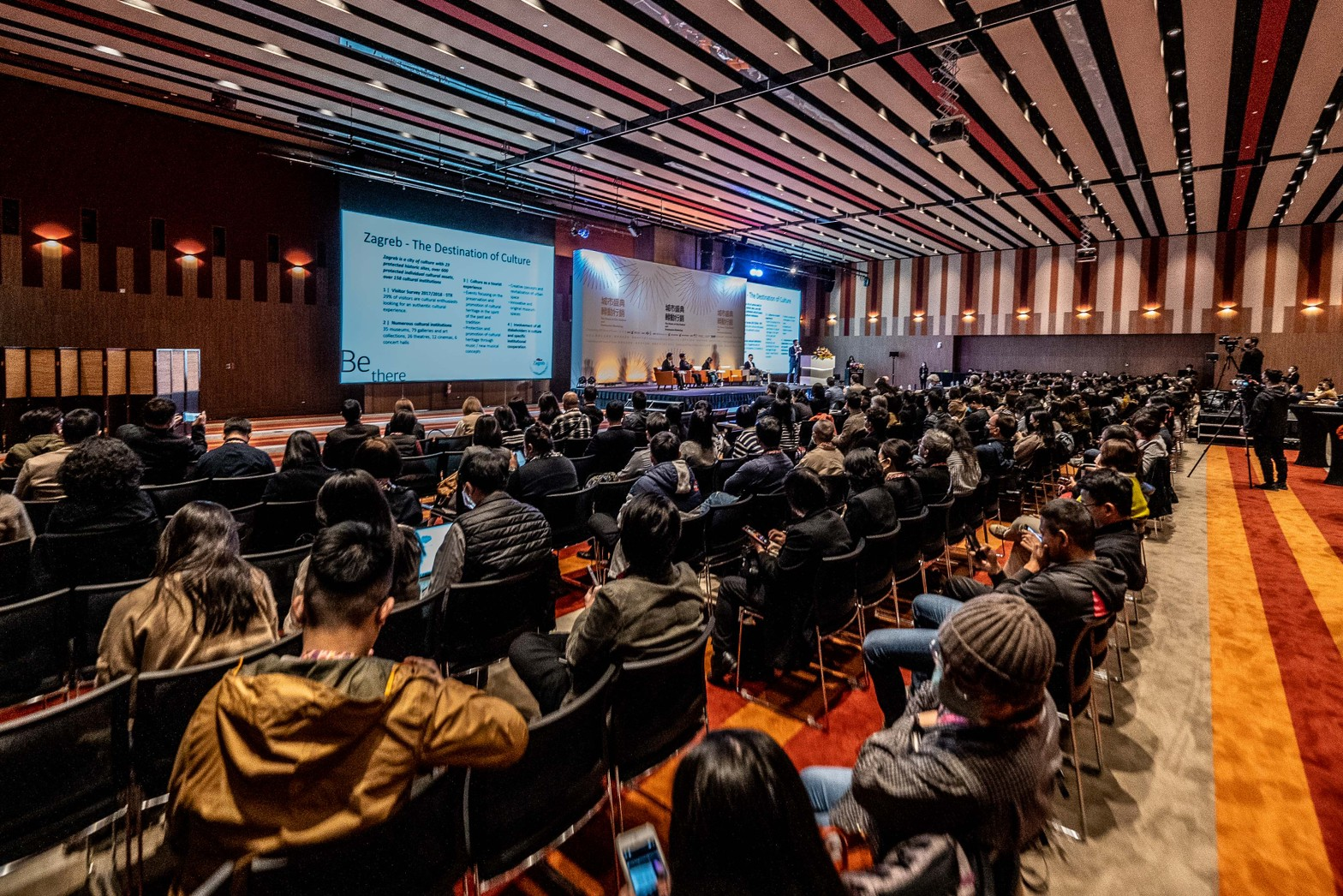
Marketing event in Zeelandia

Located on the third floor, it is the second largest conference room in the convention center, with a capacity of 800 people.

Zeelandia refers to the ship Zeelandia that Martinus Sonck used to sail to the Pescadores (modern-day Penghu) and Formosa (modern-day Taiwan). He was the commander who withdrew the Dutch forces from Pescadores to Formosa, and became the first governor of Dutch Formosa. He later constructed Fort Zeelandia, which was named after the ship, as a navigational landmark and to oversee maritime trade in Tainan.

=== Nusantaria ===
Located on first floor, it consists of five meeting rooms, each with a capacity of 100 people.

Nusantaria refers to Nusantara, an Old Javanese term describing the islands outside of Java that were under the realm of the Majapahit Empire. This region became pivotal to international trade from the 17th century when the Dutch East Indies served as a trading hub between China, India, the Islamic world, and particularly Tainan of Dutch Formosa.

=== Orange ===
Located on the first floor, it consists of three meeting rooms, each with a capacity of 20 people.

Orange is a reference to the Orange City in 1624, the original name of the Dutch settlement in Tainan before it was renamed to Fort Zeelandia when it finished construction. The name was derived from the Prince of Orange, which during that time was the title held by the stadtholder of all provinces of Dutch Republic, including Holland and Zeeland.

=== Supporting facilities ===
The convention center has an information center, a medical room, lockers, mobile charging stations, gender-neutral restrooms, parent-child restrooms, breastfeeding rooms and prayer rooms. For food and beverages, there is also a Starbucks mini-store, named ICC Tainan Cafe, and a 7-Eleven store located within the convention center. The convention center provides taxi booking service and wheelchair rental service.

The convention center provides 550 parking space in the indoor parking area, and 464 scooter parking spaces in the outdoor parking area. In the indoor parking area, there are fast-charging stations for electric vehicles and parking spaces for wheelchair users and families. The indoor parking area is connected to the conference area with a skybridge, located on the third floor. The skybridge crosses through the main exhibition hall, giving visitors a view of the exhibition below.

== Notable events ==
=== The National Games in Tainan 2023 ===
The convention center was chosen to be the main venue for the National Games in Tainan 2023. The event was held from 21 October to 26 October 2023. The opening ceremony, the National Games banquet and the closing ceremony were all held in the convention center.

=== 2024 Taiwan Lantern Festival ===
The convention center was one of the two venues for the 2024 Taiwan Lantern Festival. It was held in the site of the convention center from 24 February to 10 March 2024.

The festival showcased more than 300 art installations and light shows and 170 live performances. One of the art installations was Drop of Light created by Dutch artist Gijs van Bon, in collaboration with ASML and GLOW Eindhoven. The festival had attracted more than 15 million visitors from all across Taiwan and the world.

Alongside the festival, the 2024 Taiwan International Orchid Show and the 23rd World Orchid Conference was also held, with the convention center being one of its two exhibition areas. It was also held during the same period from 24 February to 10 March 2024. The event attracted more than 1,000 participants and 350,000 visitors from 62 countries to both exhibition areas.

As an opening show for the festival, the grand Taiwanese opera show 1624 was presented by the National Center for Traditional Arts (NCFTA) to commemorate the 400th anniversary of Tainan. The show took place on 24 and 25 February 2024 at the convention center.

=== 2024 Southern Semiconductor Forum ===
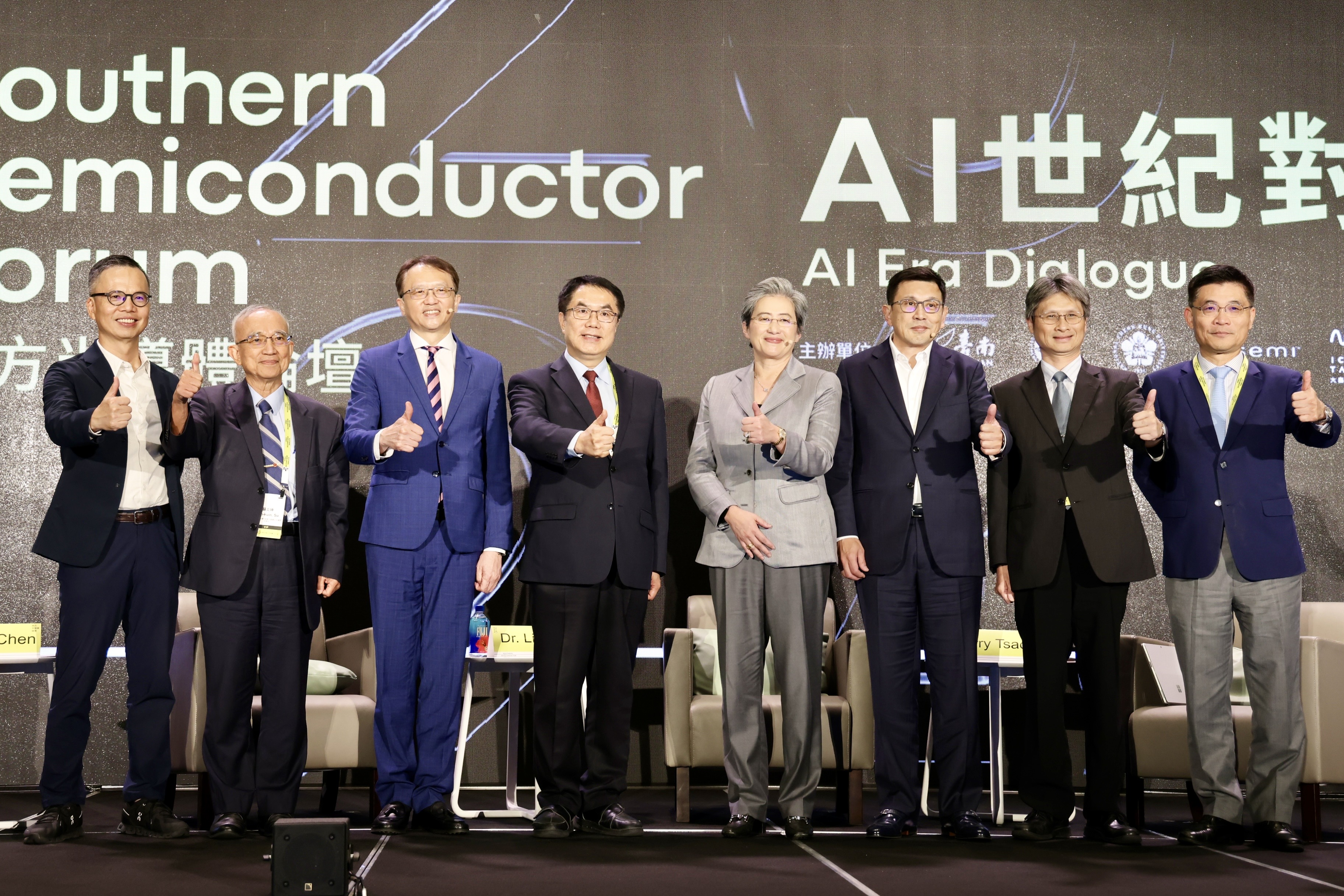
2024 Southern Semiconductor Forum

The convention center hosted the 2024 Southern Semiconductor Forum on 7 June 2024, which was also the final day of Computex. The forum discussed some of the latest and future semiconductor technologies, while highlighting the crucial role Tainan played in the development of semiconductors. The main feature of this forum was when Lisa Su, CEO of AMD, and Jason Chen, CEO of Acer, held a discussion about their perspectives on artificial intelligence (AI).

=== 2024 Asia Agri-Tech Expo & Forum ===
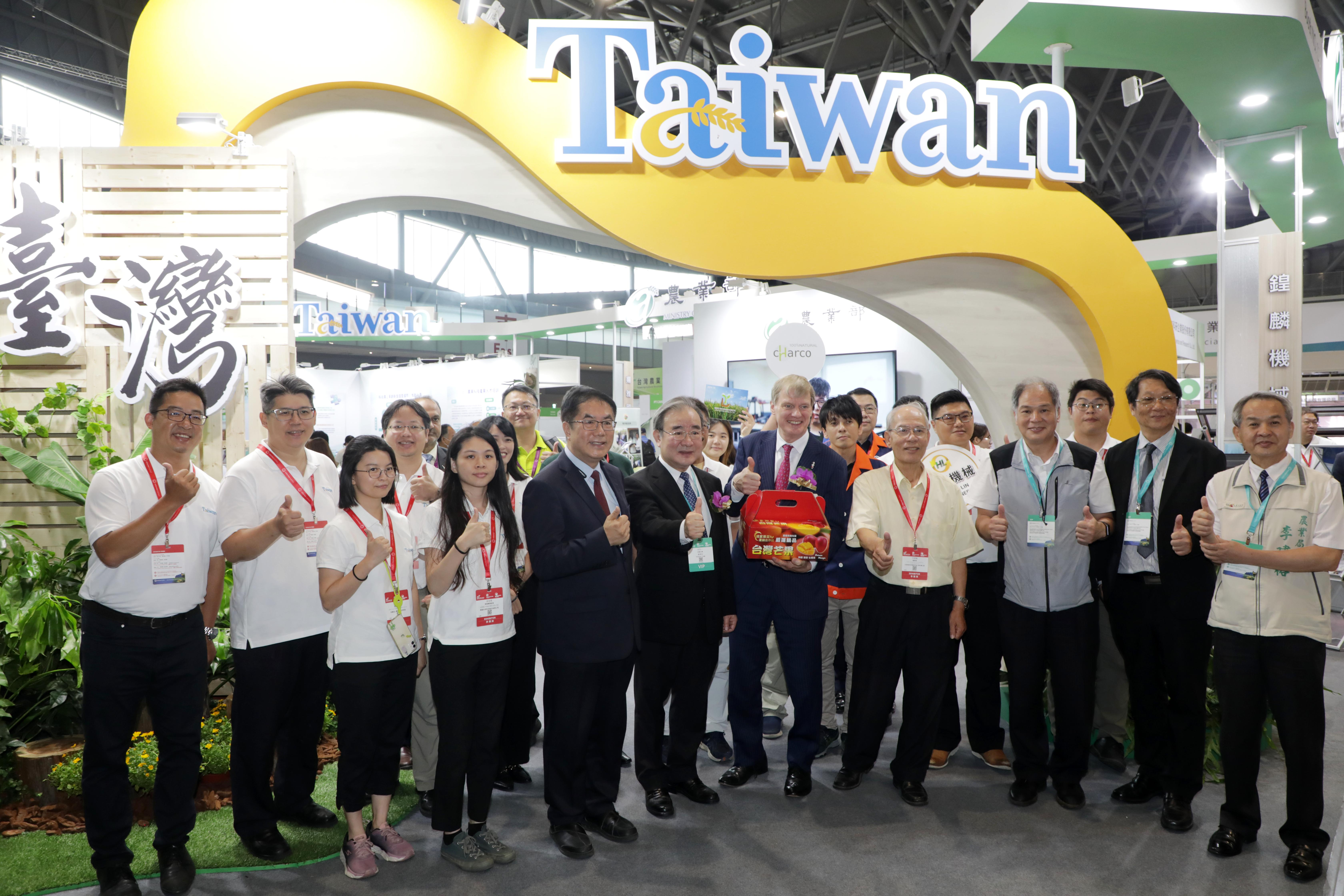
2024 Asia Agri-Tech Expo & Forum

The convention center hosted the 2024 Asia Agri-Tech Expo & Forum from 19 June to 21 June 2024. The 2024 Livestock Taiwan Expo and 2024 Aquaculture Taiwan Expo were also held concurrently. These three exhibitions was previously held in Taipei, and this was the first time they were held in Tainan.

The exhibition showcased the latest agricultural technologies and achievements, while promoting industry transformation and upgrading. There were 400 booths set up by around 250 producers and companies from 13 countries, and featured 52 agricultural, livestock, and aquaculture professional forums and seminars. The exhibition had attracted over 27,811 professional attendees from 33 countries.

=== 2024 Creative Expo Taiwan ===
The convention center served as the main venue for the 2024 Creative Expo Taiwan, which was held from 26 August to 1 September 2024.

During the event, the convention center featured a diverse array of exhibitions, performances, and interactive experiences, with participation of over 570 brands and nearly 700 booths. The convention center attracted over 12,000 people on the first day alone. For the duration of the week-long event, the event attracted 620,000 visitors in total across all of its five venues.

=== Automotive and motorsports events ===
The convention center attracted many automotive and motorsport events to Tainan, especially during 2024. It hosted automotive exhibitions such as the 2023, 2024 and 2025 Tainan Autoshow, and the 2024 Stance Fest. Also, it hosted motorsports events such as the Isuzu Shokuzine Challenge 2024, the 2024 Taiwan D1 Grand Prix and the 2025 American Motorsports Festival.

==== 2024 Taiwan D1 Grand Prix ====
The 2024 Taiwan D1 Grand Prix Tainan Drift Round 1 and 2 was held in the area behind the convention center from 14 December to 15 December 2024. This was the first event held by the D1 Grand Prix Taiwan team since they had been officially recognised in 2024. Many prominent professional drifters, such as Naoki Nakamura and Daigo Saito, participated in the event.

The winner of the first round was Yuki Tano, and the winner of the second round was Naoki Nakamura.

==== 2025 American Motorsports Festival ====
The 2025 American Motorsports Festival will be held from 18 January to 19 January 2025, in the area behind the convention center. The event is organized in affiliation with the Formula DRIFT series. The founders of the Formula Drift series, Jim Liaw and Ryan Sage, and president of Formula DRIFT Japan, Kazuhiko Iwata, are invited to attend the event.

=== Tainan International Green Industry EXPO ===
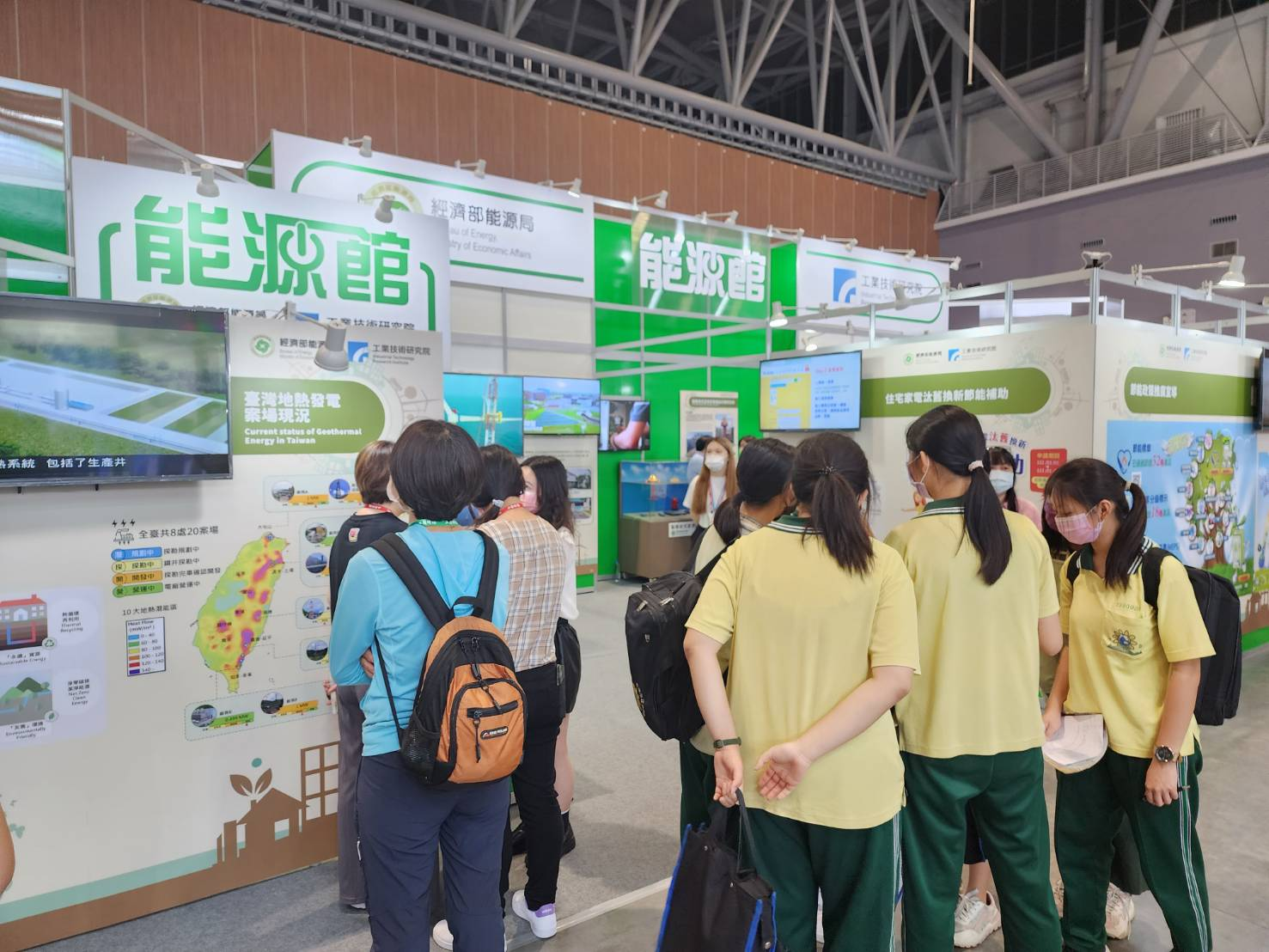
2023 Tainan International Green Industry EXPO

The convention center hosted the Tainan International Green Industry EXPO for 2022, 2023 and 2024. The exhibition was first inaugurated in 2022. The exhibition showcased the latest innovations in green technologies and provided a platform for fostering partnerships within the green industry. It also held professional seminars, which had attracted 30 speakers and 650 participants in 2023.

In 2024, the exhibition attracted 80 exhibitors from seven countries, with a total of 250 booths. It also held the "Greater Southern Technology S Corridor — Net Zero Transformation · Energy Sustainability Forum" on 30 May, which attracted 8 speakers from organizations such as ITRI, Taiwan Sugar Corporation and Taiwan Cement. The "2024 Green Circular Materials and Product Innovation Application Seminar" was also held on the same day.

The exhibition for 2025 will be renamed to Taiwan Carbon Neutral & Sustainability Expo.

=== Tainan Automatic Machinery & Intelligent Manufacturing Show ===
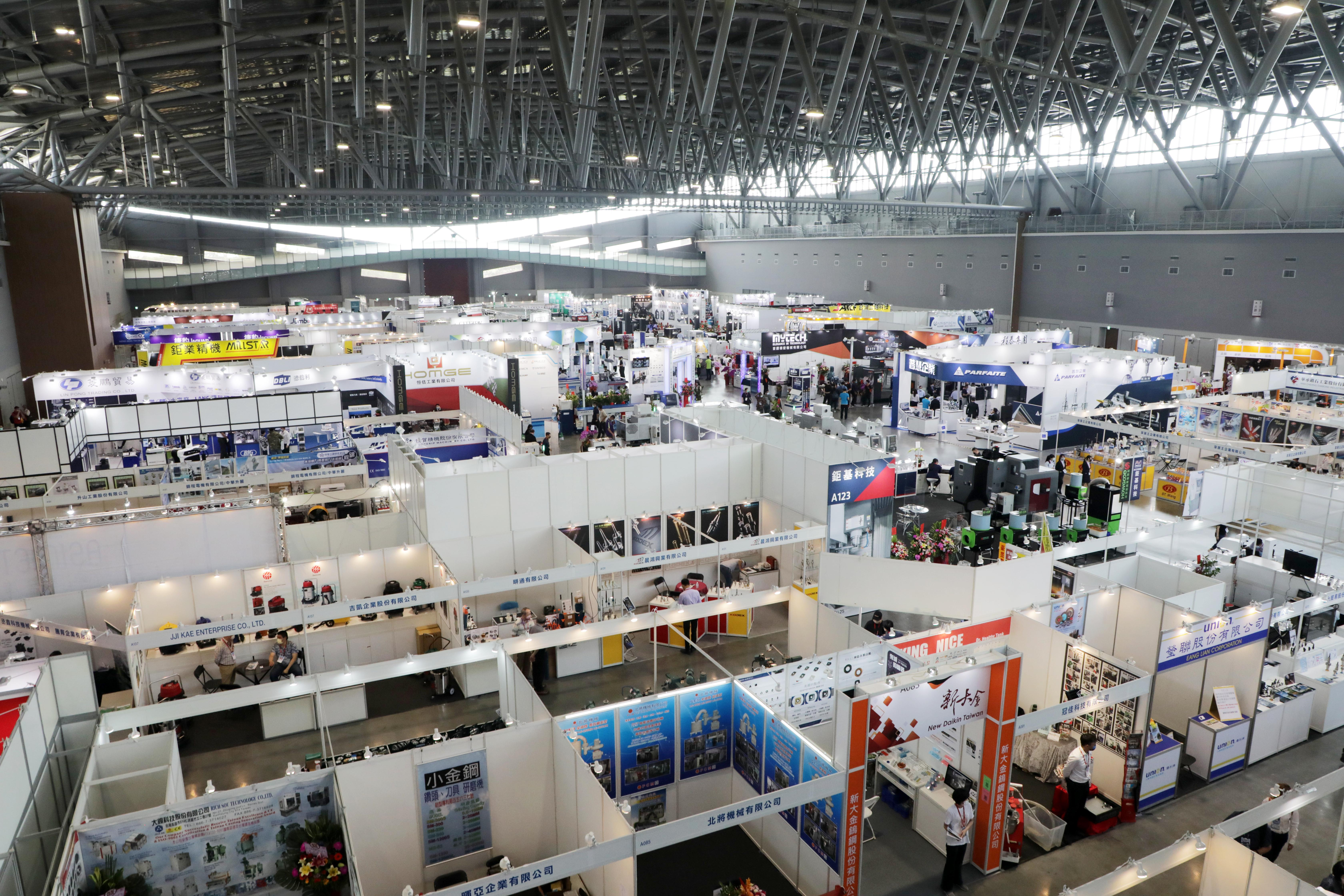
2022 Tainan Automatic Machinery & Intelligent Manufacturing Show

The convention center hosted the Tainan Automatic Machinery & Intelligent Manufacturing Show (CTMS Tainan) for 2022, 2023 and 2024. The exhibition was organized by the Commercial Times.

Tainan Automatic Machinery & Intelligent Manufacturing Show 2022 was held as the inauguration event for the convention center when it opened on 21 April 2022. The exhibition in 2023 attracted over 200 companies with 660 booths, and the exhibition in 2024 attracted over 190 companies with 650 booths.

The Metal Industries Research & Development Center of Taiwan also held their "2023 Research and Development Achievements Presentation" in the convention center during the 2024 exhibition.

=== Experience Life ===
The convention center hosted the Experience Life exhibition for 2023 and 2024, which was an exhibition to showcase interior design and building materials. The exhibition was first inaugurated in 2023.

In an interview with Vogue Taiwan, the organizers mentioned their vision was to create an experience in Tainan that was different to other more popular building materials exhibitions in Taipei and Kaohsiung. Their goal was to have visitors experience materials through design and storytelling.

The exhibition in 2023 had 250 booths and attracted more than 30,000 visitors. There were also 16 seminars presented by architects, landscape architects, structural designers and interior designers from Taiwan.

The exhibition in 2024 increased its size to 310 booths, and held 15 seminars. In addition to the architects, structural designers and interior designers from Taiwan, the exhibition also invited 5 architects and designers from Japan to present the seminars.

=== Tainan 400 "City's Culinary Power" ===
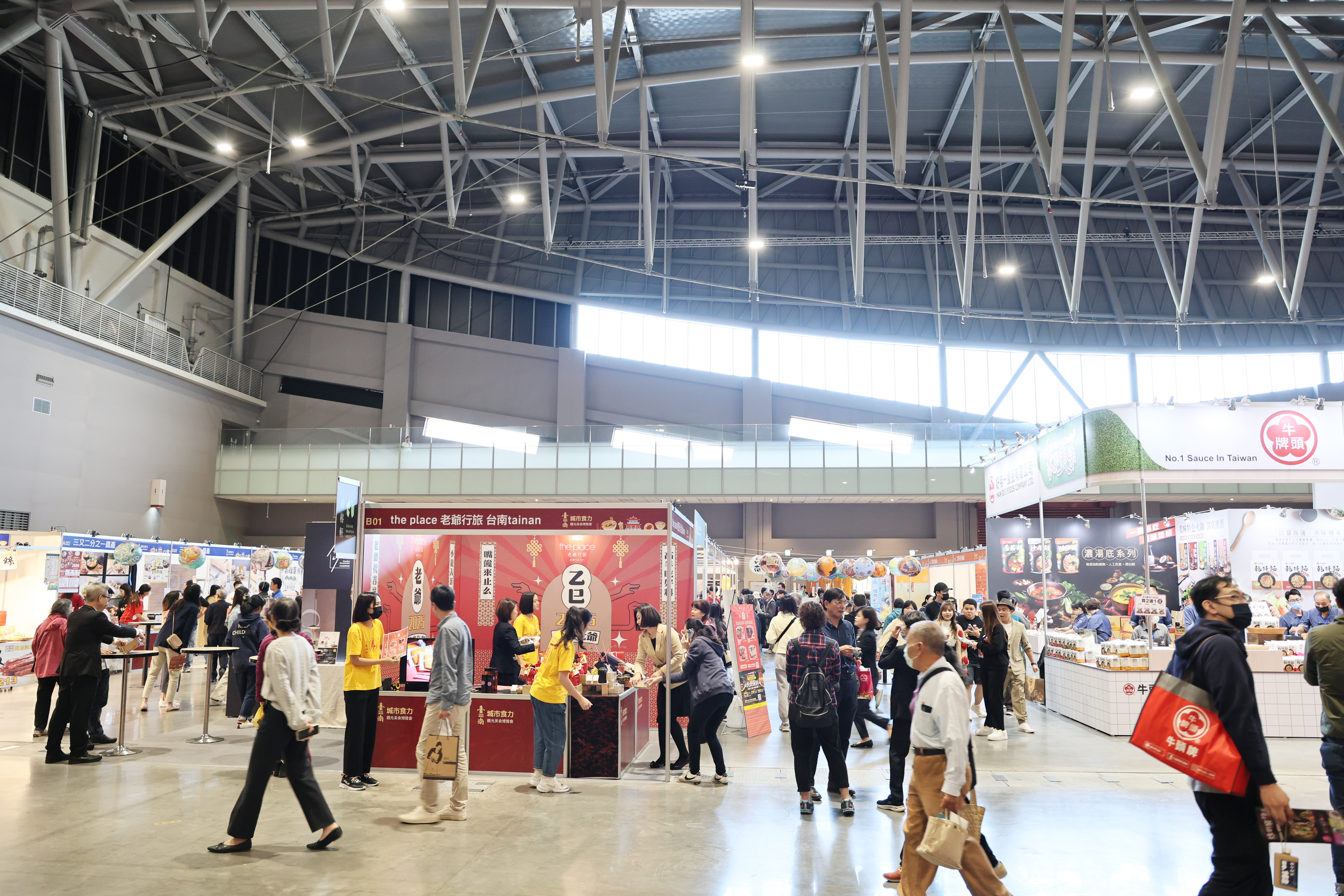
Culinary Tourism and Food Expo

Tainan 400 "City's Culinary Power" was a series of events organised by the Tainan City Government to promote the cuisine of Tainan on its 400th anniversary. The events included food exhibitions, pop-up stalls, food tours and a grand banquet as the final event.

The Culinary Tourism and Food Expo was held in the convention center from 29 November to 2 December 2024.

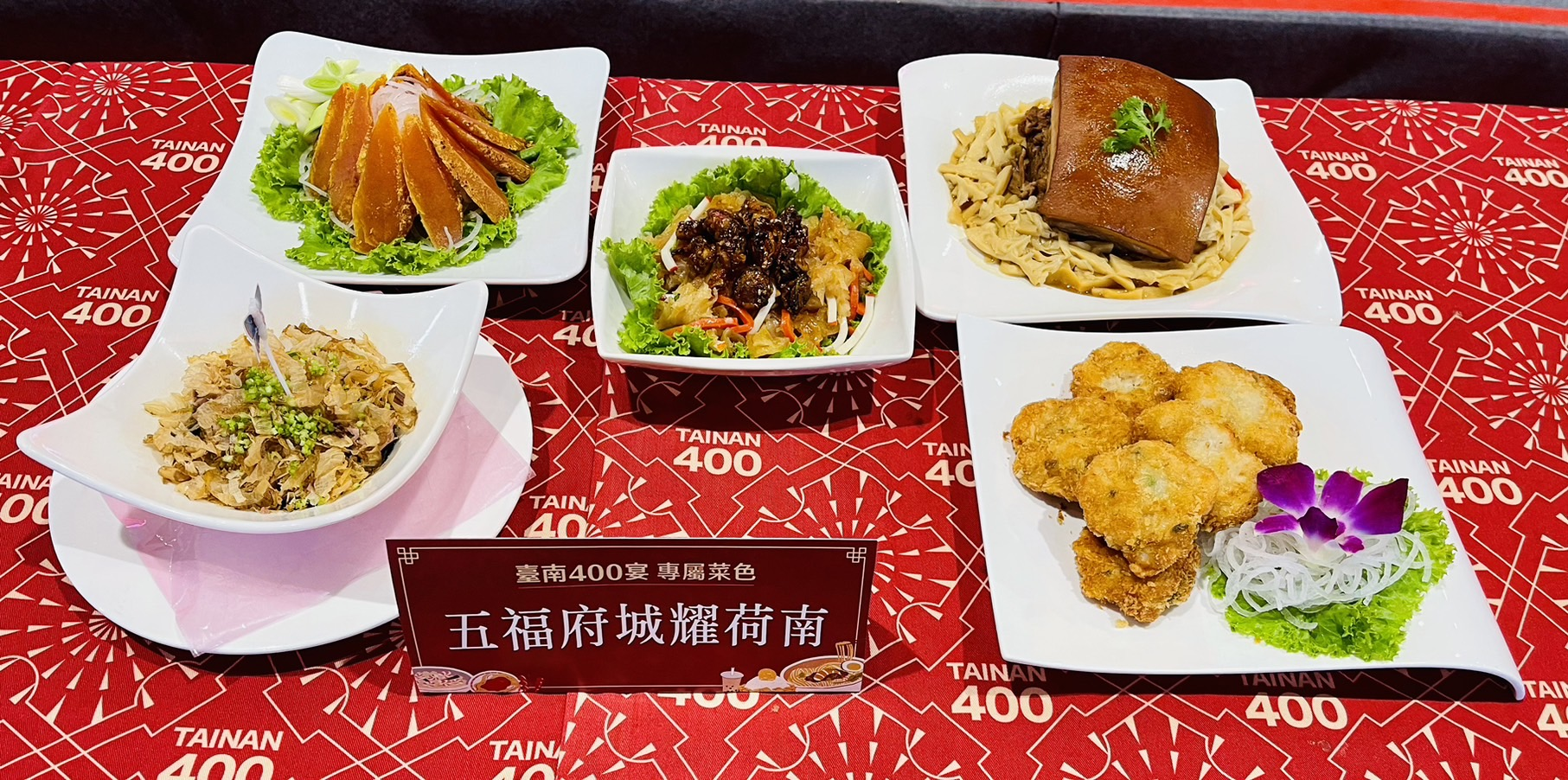
Dishes from Tainan 400 Banquet

The Tainan 400 Banquet was held in the convention center on 29 December 2024. It was the final event of the "City's Culinary Power" series as well as the Tainan 400 series. The menu of banquet was designed by four renowned roadside banquet chefs from Tainan, featuring signature dishes from Tainan and using local ingredients from Tainan. The banquet also featured a performance from Dutch opera singer Martin Hurkens and the guzheng ensemble from Tainan National University of the Arts. The banquet originally planned to host 400 tables, but increased to 488 tables due to popular demand. With 10 diners on each table, the banquet attracted 4,880 guests in total.

=== Other events ===
List of events held in ICC Tainan
Year	Date	Event	Length (days)	Ref.
2022	19 March	"Create, Tainan" Pressure Test Concert — with Your Woman Sleep With Others, SHOU, Mixer, Enno Cheng	1	
2022	21–25 April	2022 Tainan Automatic Machinery & Intelligent Manufacturing Show	5	
2022	2–4 September	Tainan International Green Industry EXPO 2022	3	
2022	2–4 September	2022 Tainan Lifestyle Week	3	
2022	16–19 September	2022 Tainan Health Carnival Exhibition	4	
2022	16–19 September	2022 Tainan Baby & Mommy Expo	4	
2022	22–26 September	2022 Tainan Machinery Show	5	
2022	6–9 October	2022 Tainan Toplink Int'l Pets Fair	4	
2022	6–9 October	2022 Tainan Furniture & Bed Design Expo	4	
2022	26–27 October	6th Fatty Pig International Conference	2	
2022	26–27 October	The 2nd Taiwan International Animal Precision Nutrition Forum 2022	2	
2022	11–13 November	2022 Taiwan Plant Show	3	
2022	17–18 November	2022 Green Energy Innovation and Startups Expo	2	
2022	18–21 November	2022 Tainan International Travel Fair	4	
2022	23–25 November	2022 Taiwan International Intelligent Manufacturing Show	3	
2022	10 December	2023 Pokémon Taiwan Regional League: Tainan	1	
2023	21 February	The Power of City Festival and Destination Marketing Forum	1	
2023	24–27 February	2023 Tainan Autoshow	4	
2023	28 February	Tainan 2023 Rock of Spring Music Concert	1	
2023	20–24 April	2023 Tainan Automatic Machinery & Intelligent Manufacturing Show	5	
2023	24–26 May	Tainan International Green Industry EXPO 2023	3	
2023	18 June	2023 Mushroom Festival 1st	1	
2023	13–16 July	Experience Life 2023	4	
2023	21–23 July	The First Memorial Anniversary of Most Venerable Grand Master Chin Kung	3	
2023	4–7 August	2023 Tainan Toplink Int'l Pets Fair	4	
2023	4–7 August	2023 Tainan Travel and Souvenirs Fair	4	
2023	4–7 August	2023 Tainan Furniture & Bed Design Expo	4	
2023	8–10 September	2023 Tainan Lifestyle Week	3	
2023	14–17 September	2023 Tainan Baby & Mommy Expo	4	
2023	14–17 September	2023 Southern Taiwan Biotechnology Exhibition	4	
2023	22–25 September	2023 Tainan Industrial Automation Exhibition	4	
2023	21–26 October	The National Games in Tainan 2023 — Opening Ceremony, National Games Banquet and Closing Ceremony	6	
2023	10–12 November	2023 Taiwan Plant Show — Asia Plant Exposition	3	
2023	17–19 November	2023 Tainan Wedding Show	3	
2023	17–20 November	2023 Tainan International Travel Fair	4	
2023	17–20 November	2023 Tainan Pet Products and Services Exhibition	4	
2023	24–26 November	2023 Smart Life in Tainan	3	
2023	21 December	2023 Shalun Gala	1	
2024	20–21 January	1st Designer Toy Tainan	2	
2024	26–29 January	2024 Tainan Autoshow	4	
2024	24–25 February	1624 (Taiwanese opera show)	2	
2024	24 February – 10 March	2024 Taiwan Lantern Festival	16	
2024	24 February – 10 March	2024 Taiwan International Orchid Show and the 23rd World Orchid Conference	16	
2024	24 February – 10 March	hololive production Lantern Pop-Up Event	16	
2024	17 March	2024 Mushroom Festival 2nd	1	
2024	21–24 March	2024 Tainan Rubber and Plastics Industry Exhibition (TAINANPLAS)	4	
2024	30 March	8th National Chiayi University Taiwan Important Swine Disease Forum	1	
2024	26–29 April	2024 Tainan Automatic Machinery & Intelligent Manufacturing Show	4	
2024	24–27 May	2024 Tainan International Tourism Gourmet Festival	4	
2024	24–27 May	2024 Tainan Meng Meng Pet Products Exhibition	4	
2024	24–27 May	2024 Tainan Stylish Furniture & Smart AI Mattresses Exhibition	4	
2024	30 May – 1 June	Tainan International Green Industry EXPO 2024	3	
2024	31 May – 2 June	2024 Tainan Lifestyle Week	3	
2024	6–16 June	2024 Big Bad Wolf Books Fair in Tainan	11	
2024	7 June	2024 Southern Semiconductor Forum	1	
2024	19–21 June	2024 Asia Agri-Tech Expo & Forum	3	
2024	19–21 June	2024 Livestock Taiwan	3	
2024	19–21 June	2024 Aquaculture Taiwan	3	
2024	4–7 July	Experience Life 2024	4	
2024	22–28 July	64th National Primary and High School Science Fair	7	
2024	26 August – 1 September	2024 Creative Expo Taiwan	7	
2024	13–16 September	2024 Tainan Baby & Mommy Expo	4	
2024	20–23 September	2024 Tainan Toplink Int'l Pets Fair	4	
2024	20–23 September	2024 Tainan Travel and Souvenirs Fair	4	
2024	20–23 September	2024 Tainan Furniture & Bed Design Expo	4	
2024	4–5 October	1st Formosa Conference on Non-Destructive Testing (FCNDT 2024)	2	
2024	8–10 November	2024 Asia Plant Exposition	3	
2024	15–17 November	2024 Tainan Wedding Show	3	
2024	15–18 November	2024 Tainan International Travel Fair	4	
2024	15–18 November	2024 Tainan Pet Products and Services Exhibition	4	
2024	15–18 November	2024 Southern Taiwan Biotechnology Exhibition	4	
2024	15–18 November	113 Tainan Information Month — AI Application Exhibition and Forum	4	
2024	24 November	Stance Fest Taiwan	1	
2024	24 November	Isuzu Shokuzine Challenge 2024	1	
2024	29 November – 2 December	Tainan 400 "City's Culinary Power" — Culinary Tourism and Food Expo	4	
2024	14–15 December	2024 Taiwan D1 Grand Prix Tainan Drift Rd. 1&2	2	
2024	29 December	Tainan 400 "City's Culinary Power" — 400 Banquet	1	
2024	29 December	2nd Vacances de Pinocchio Doll-only Fair	1	
2025	18–19 January	2025 American Motorsports Festival in Tainan (affiliated with Formula Drift)	2	
2025	27 February – 2 March	2025 Tainan Autoshow	4	
2025	8–9 March	2025 Mushroom Festival 3rd	2	
2025	14–17 March	2025 Tainan International Gift Show and Food Festival	4	
2025	25–28 April	2025 Tainan Automatic Machinery & Intelligent Manufacturing Show	4	
2025	24–25 May	2025 TaiwanADT International Conference of Digital Dental Technology	2	
2025	4–6 June	Plastics, Rubber & Composite Material Fair Taiwan	3	
2025	11–13 June	2025 Asia Agri-Tech Expo & Forum	3	
2025	11–13 June	2025 Livestock Taiwan	3	
2025	11–13 June	2025 Aquaculture Taiwan	3	
2025	19–21 June	2025 Taiwan Carbon Neutral & Sustainability Expo	3	
2025	20-22 June	2025 Tainan Lifestyle Week	3	
2025	3–6 July	Experience Life 2025	4	
2025	14–17 August	Tainan International Fastener Industry Show 2025	4	
2025	12–15 September	2025 Tainan Baby & Mommy Expo	4	

== Transportation ==
The center is accessible within walking distance west from Shalun Station of the Taiwan Railway.

The center is also accessible within walking distance west from Tainan HSR Station of the Taiwan High Speed Rail.

== Nearby Facilities ==
- Shalun Smart Green Energy Science City
- Academia Sinica South Campus
- National Science and Technology Council Cybersecurity & Smart Technology R&D Building
- National Cheng Kung University Kuei-Jen Campus
- National Yang Ming Chiao Tung University Guiren Campus
- Mitsui Outlet Park Tainan

== Gallery ==
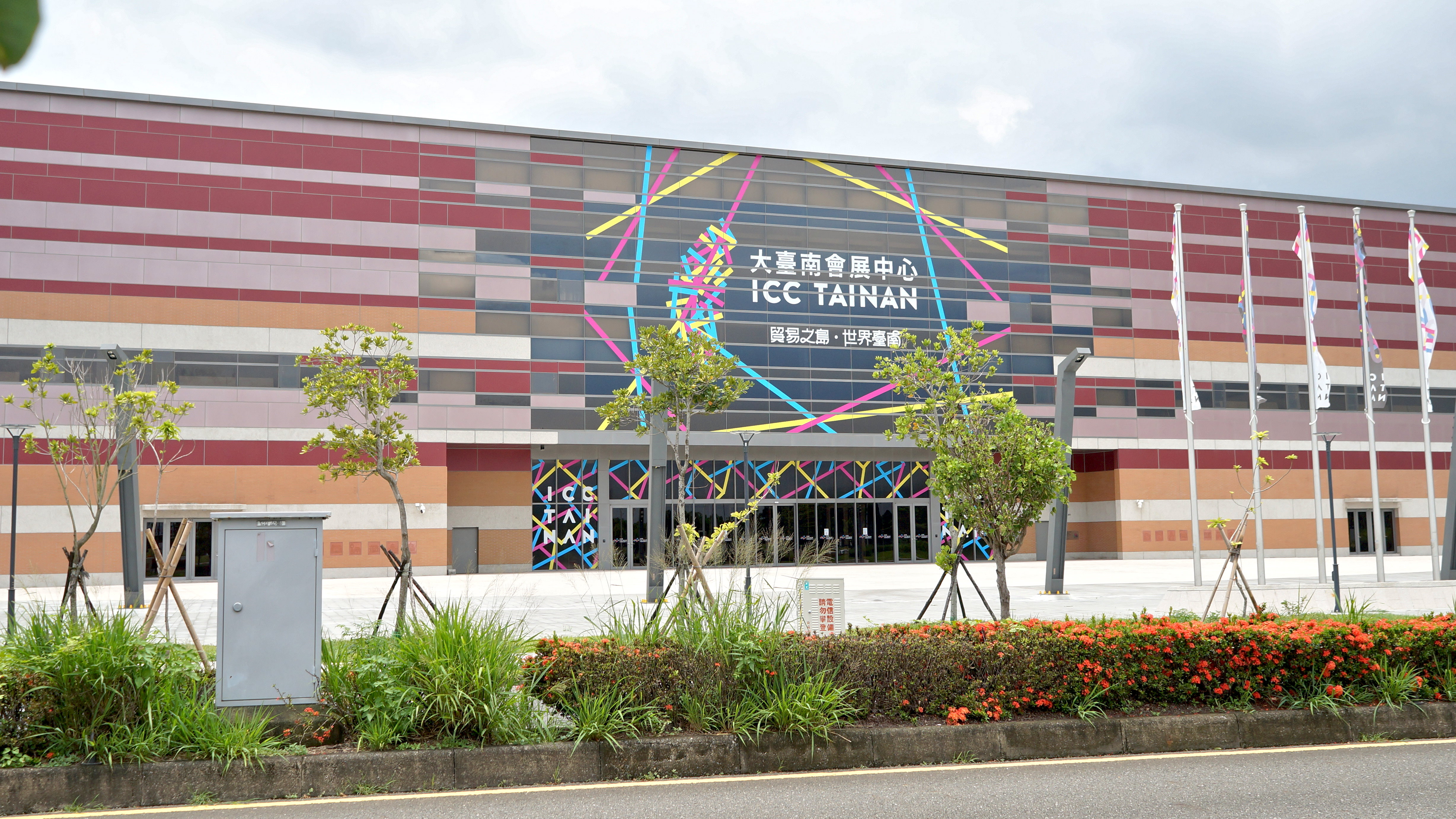
Main Entrance

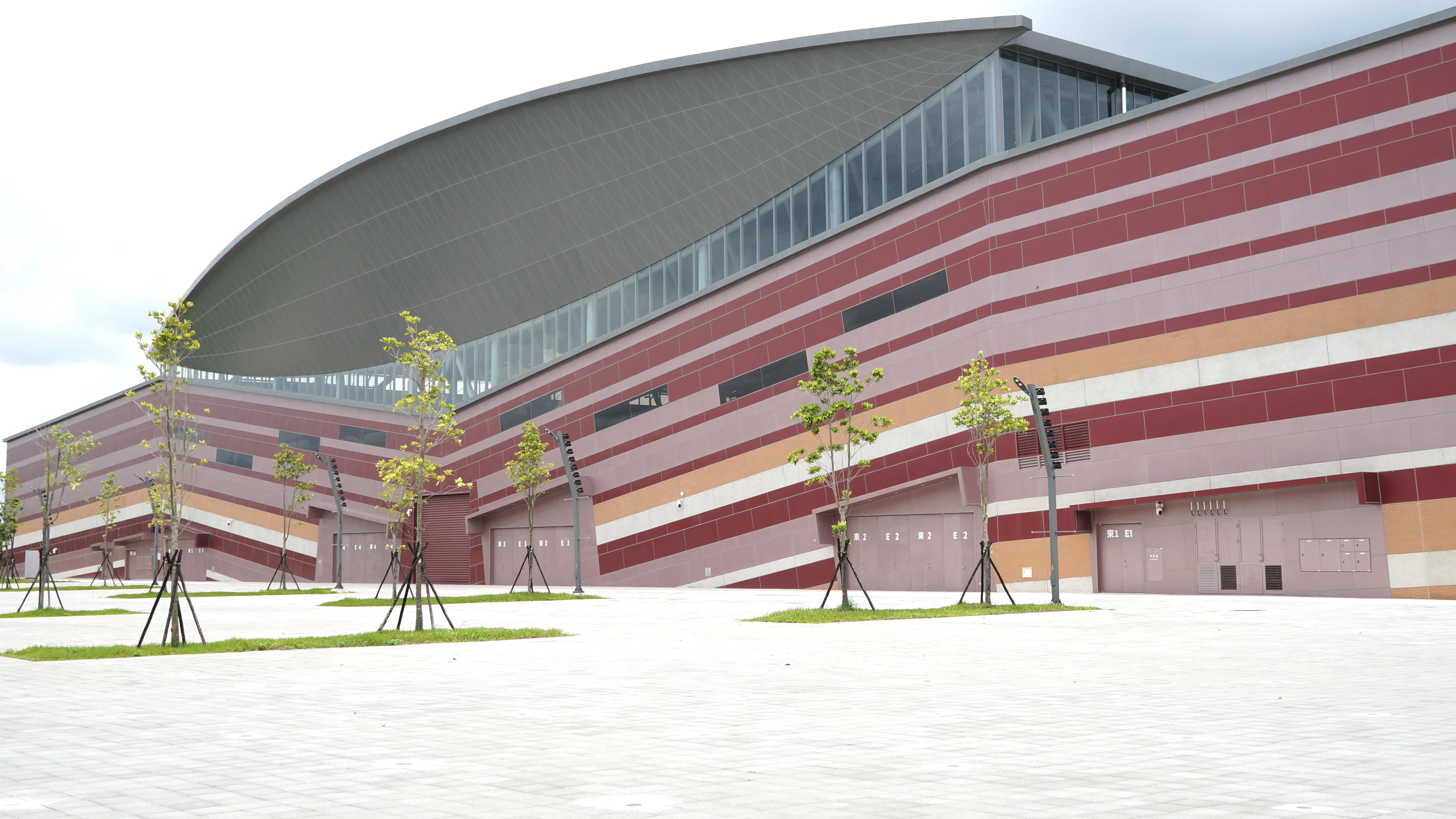
Second Entrance

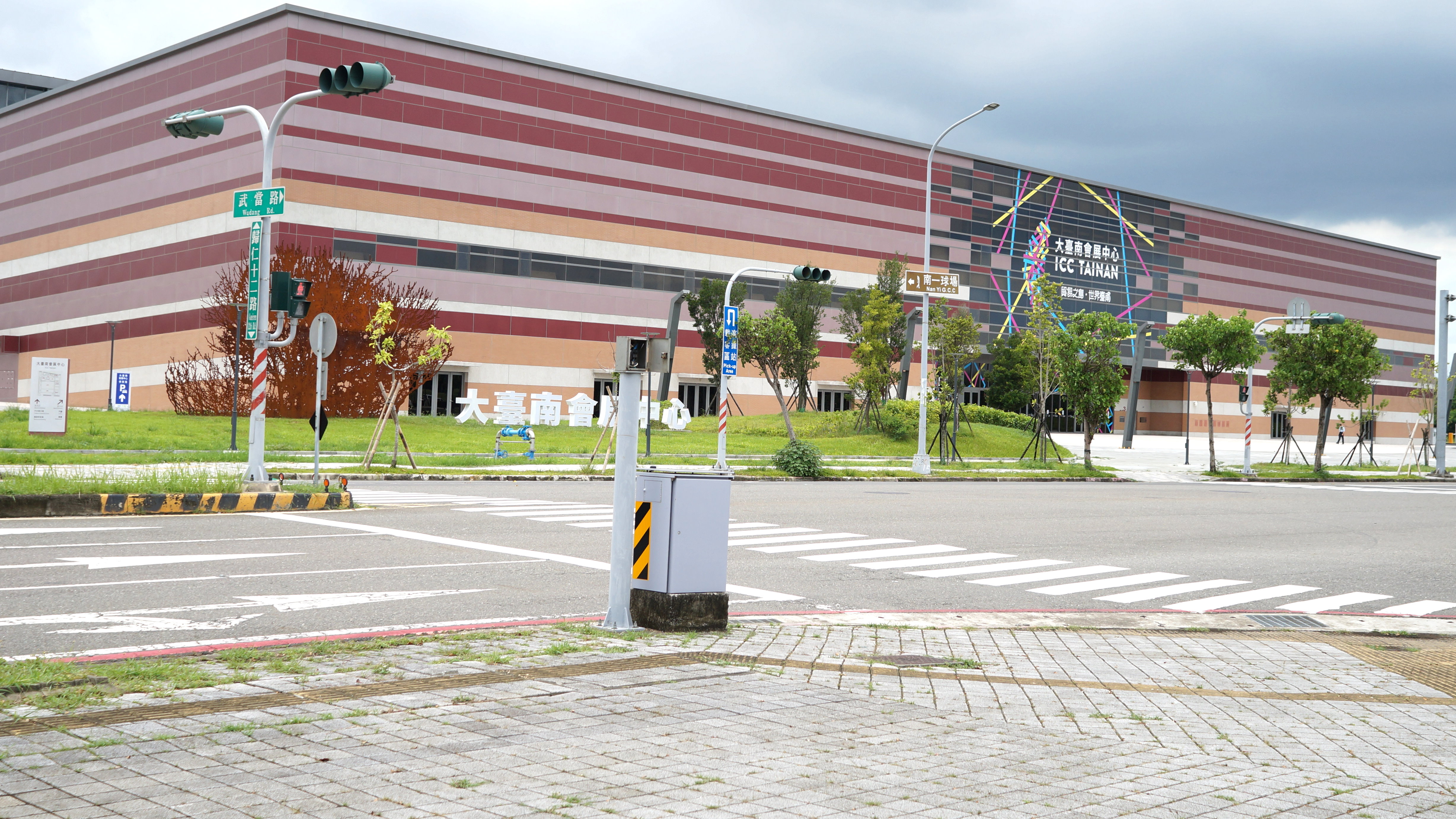
View with sculpture Nature Spreads (left)

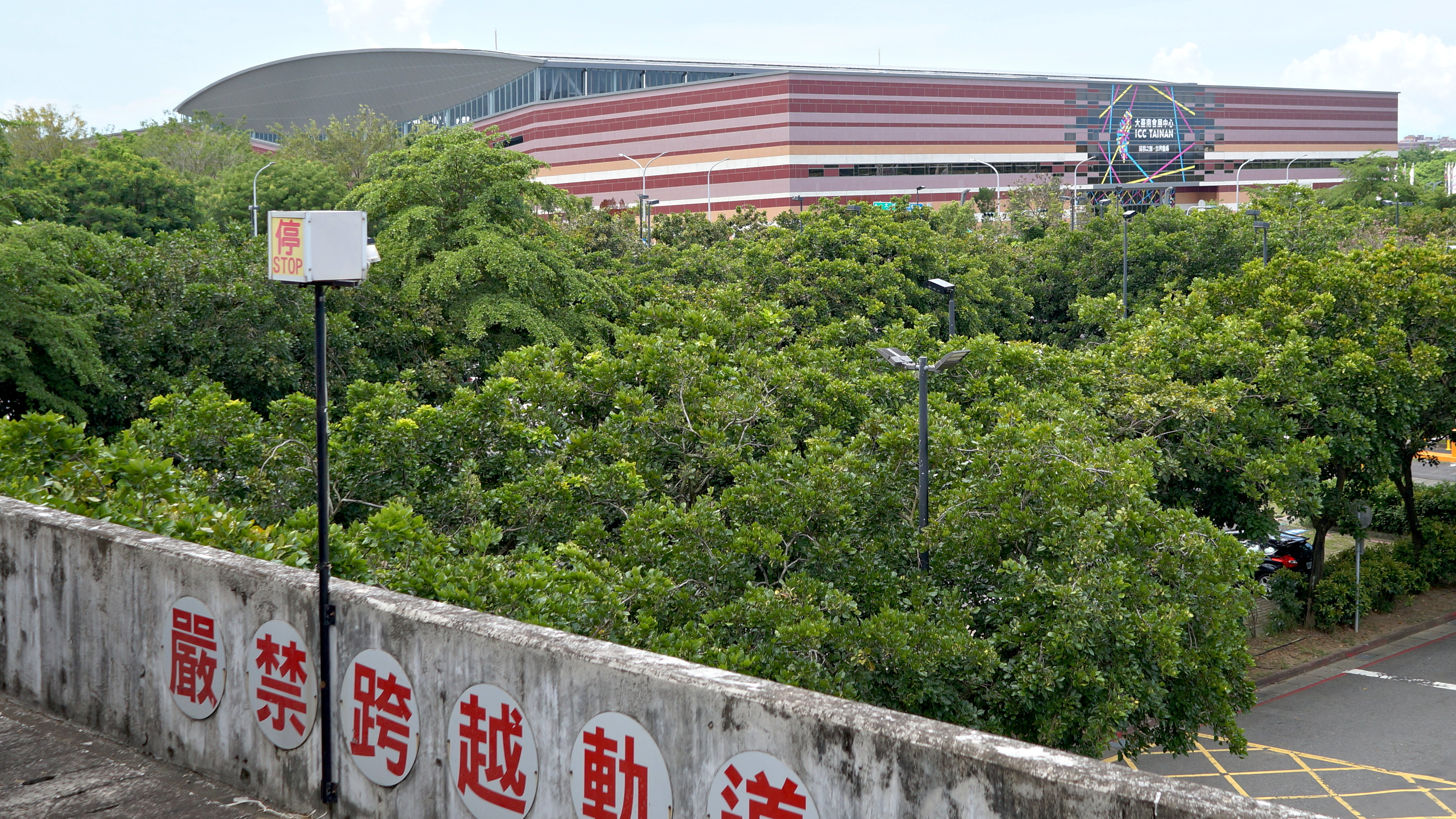
View from Shalun Station

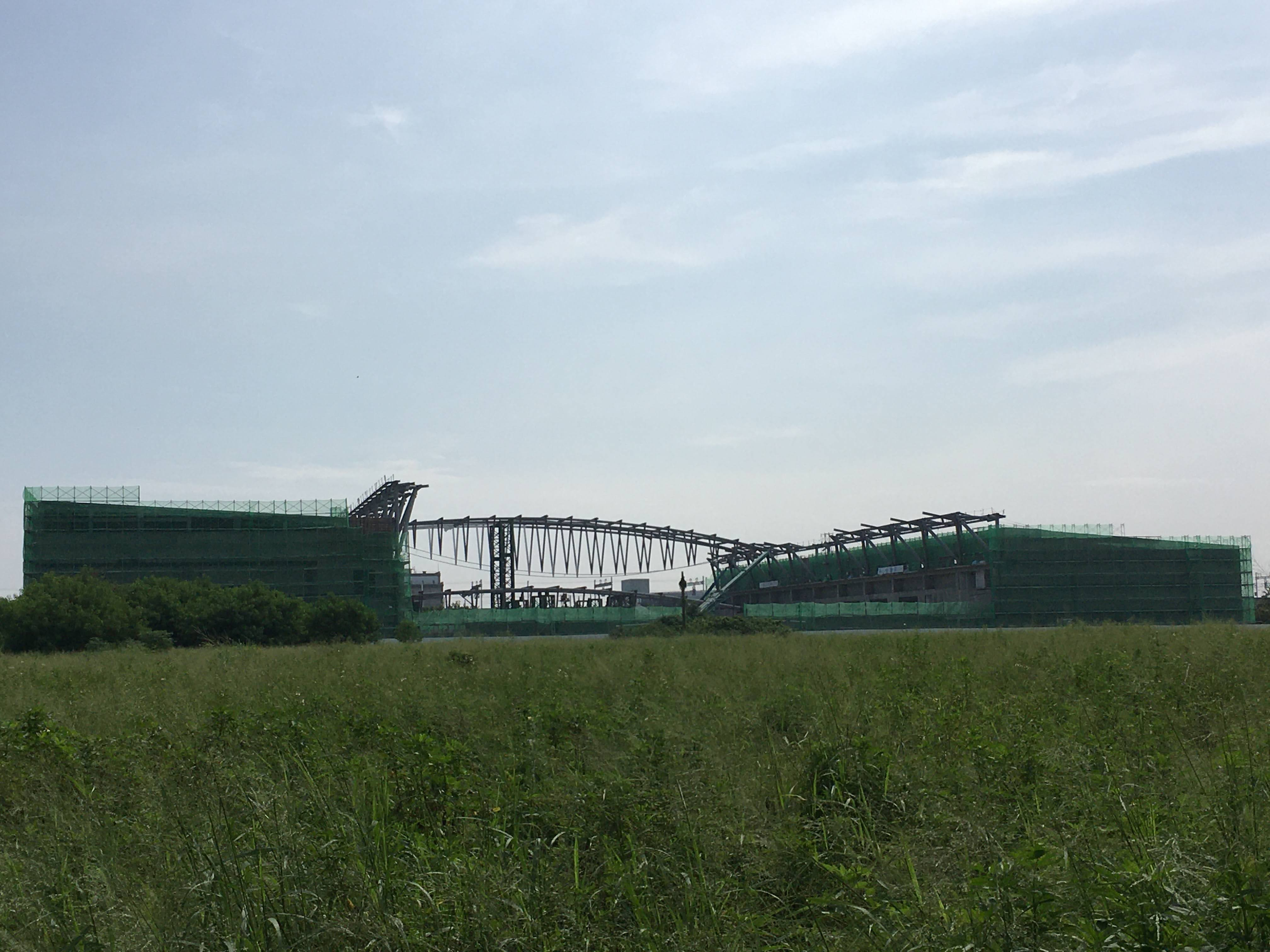
ICC Tainan under construction

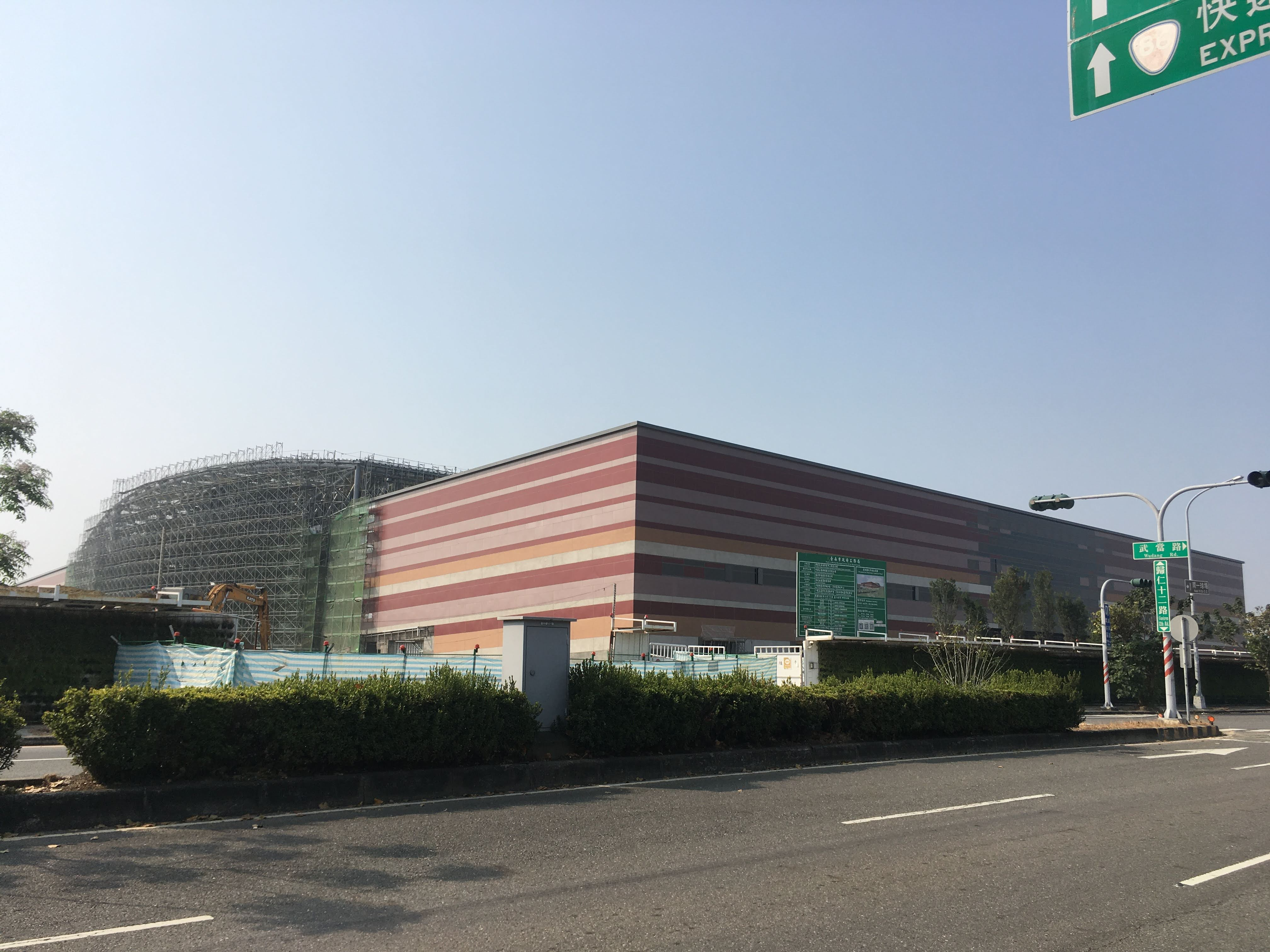
ICC Tainan under construction

== See also ==
- List of convention centers in Taiwan
- List of tourist attractions in Taiwan
