= Yang Jen-ni =

Taiwanese politician

- 楊珍妮
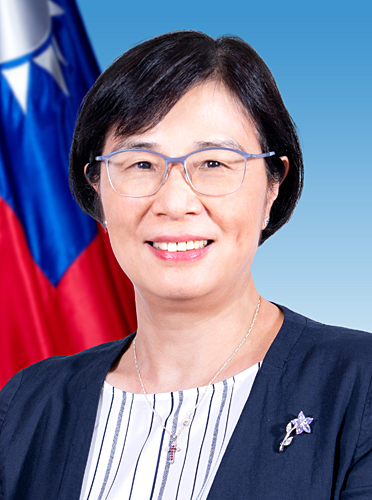
- Official portrait, 2020

Director-General of Bureau of Foreign Trade
- In office 20 August 2014 – August 2020
- Deputy: Cynthia Kiang, David Hsu
- Preceded by: Chang Chun-fu (張俊福)
- Succeeded by: Cynthia Kiang

Personal details
- Born: November 1954 (age 71)
- Education: National Taiwan University (BA)

Yang Jen-ni (Chinese: 楊珍妮; pinyin: Yáng Zhēnnī) is a Taiwanese politician who was director-general of the Bureau of Foreign Trade from 2014 to 2020.

== Early life and education ==
Yang was born in November 1954. She received her bachelor's degree in foreign literature from National Taiwan University in 1978.

== Career ==
Yang currently serves as both the Director-General of Bureau of Foreign Trade (BOFT), Ministry of Economic Affairs, and the Deputy Chief Negotiator; she is also the first female General-Director in the BOFT since 1969.

She joined the MOEA in 1983 and over the past 30 years has held a number of senior positions within MOEA and served at Taiwan's Permanent Mission to the WTO in Geneva.
