= Taiwan Lantern Festival =

Annual event

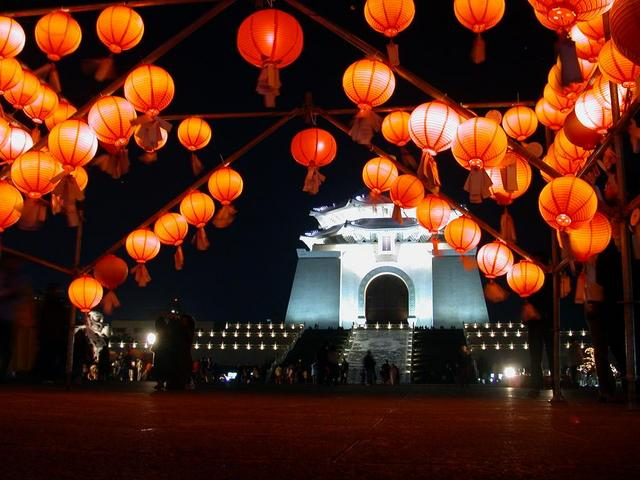
Lantern Festival at the Chiang Kai Shek Memorial Hall in 2004

The Taiwan Lantern Festival (Chinese: 臺灣燈會; pinyin: Táiwān dēnghuì) is an annual event hosted by the Tourism Bureau of the Ministry of Transportation and Communications in Taiwan to celebrate the Lantern Festival.

Many activities are held across Taiwan during the Lantern Festival. In the Pingxi Sky Lantern Festival, thousands of sky lanterns are lit over Pingxi District (平溪). In Yanshuei District, the firecrackers ceremony of the Wumiao Temple is also one of the important activities. The notoriously dangerous Tainan Yanshuei Fireworks Display, also known as the Yanshui Beehive Fireworks Festival, ("beehive of fireworks") was originally celebrated to ward off evil and disease from the town. The Taipei Pingxi Sky Lanterns were released originally to let others know that the town was safe. These lanterns are decorated with wishes and images relating to the owner. These two events are known together as "Fireworks in the South, Sky Lanterns in the North."

== History ==
Starting from 1990, the Tourism Administration integrated civilian and local governmental resources to conduct the event to celebrate the Lantern Festival (15th day of the first month in the lunar calendar) and the end of the lunar new year. The purpose of the festival is to spread the traditional folklore. It is also known as the Yuan Xiao Festival.

The firecrackers ceremony of the Wumiao temple in Yanshuei District was held by ancient people, to show respect for the exploits of Guan Yu. Fengpao is the ceremony to launch thousands of soaring firecrackers, hung on a wooden stand 5–25 metres high. This ceremony starts from six o'clock in the afternoon until five o'clock in the morning. Thousands of people and visitors attend the ceremony.

The festival is the most important annual lantern festival in Taiwan. Prior to 2001, the event was held at Chiang Kai-shek Memorial Park in Taipei. Since 2001, the event has toured Taiwan.

== Time and locations ==
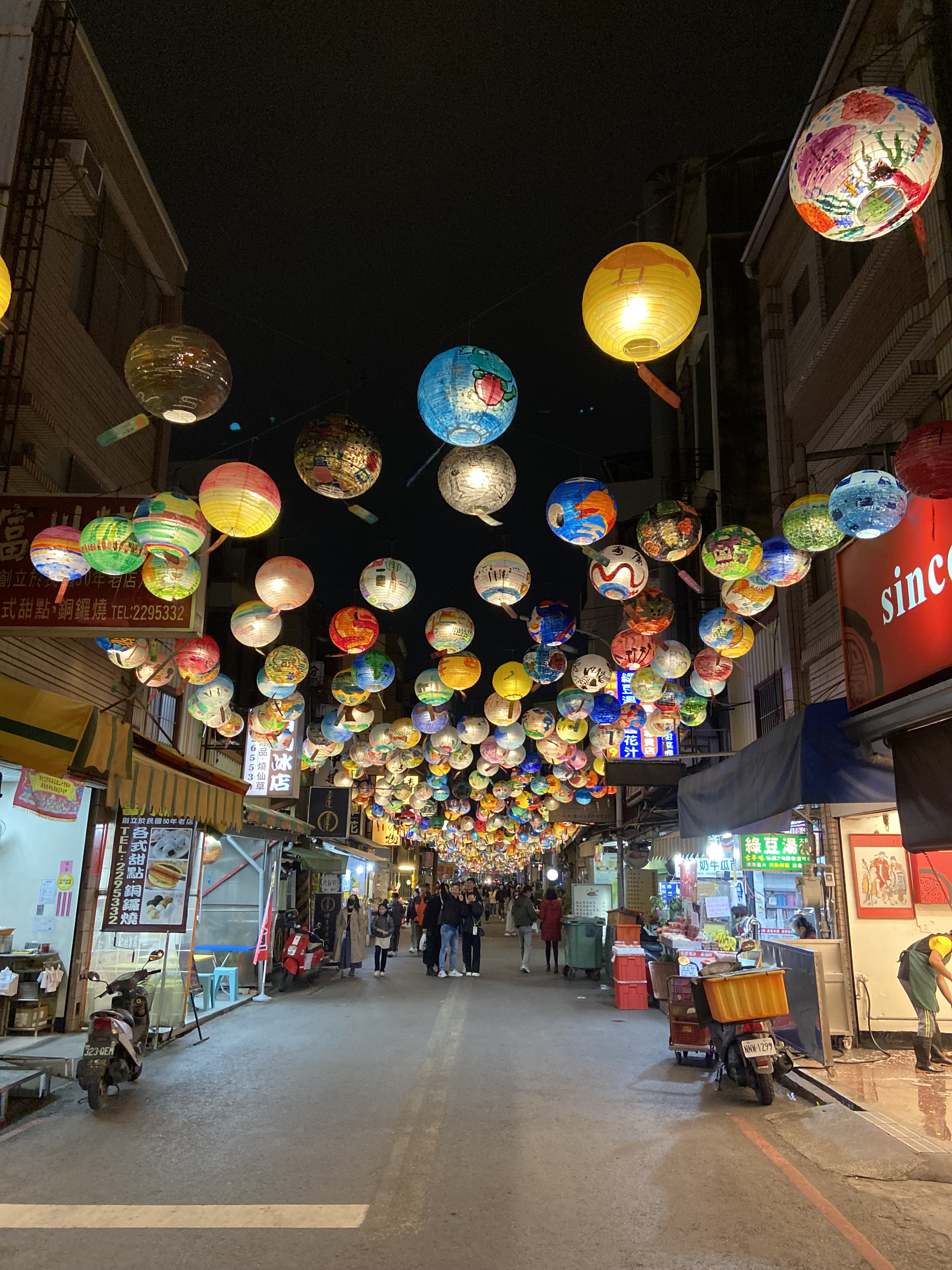
- 2024 Lantern festival in Tainan, Taiwan
  1990: February 10~12, Chiang Kai-shek Memorial Hall, Taipei City.
- 1991: March 1~3, Chiang Kai-shek Memorial Hall, Taipei City.
- 1992: February 12~18, Chiang Kai-shek Memorial Hall, Taipei City.
- 1993: February 6~8, Chiang Kai-shek Memorial Hall, Taipei City.
- 1994: February 24~27, Chiang Kai-shek Memorial Hall, Taipei City.
- 1995: February 14~16, Chiang Kai-shek Memorial Hall, Taipei City.
- 1996: March 4~6, Chiang Kai-shek Memorial Hall, Taipei City.
- 1997: February 21~23, Chiang Kai-shek Memorial Hall, Taipei City.
- 1998: February 11~15, Chiang Kai-shek Memorial Hall, Taipei City.
- 1999: March 2~7, Chiang Kai-shek Memorial Hall, Taipei City.
- 2000: February 19~27, Chiang Kai-shek Memorial Hall, Taipei City.
- 2001: February 7~14, Love River, Kaohsiung City.
- 2002: February 26~March 3, Love River, Kaohsiung City.
- 2003: February 15~23, Taichung Park and Jingguo Blvd., Taichung City.
- 2004: February 5~15, Banqiao City, Taipei County (Now is Banqiao District, New Taipei City).
- 2005: February 23~March 6, Anping Coastal History Park, Tainan City.
- 2006: February 12~26, Anping Coastal History Park, Tainan City.
- 2007: March 3~11, Taibao City, Chiayi County.
- 2008: February 21~March 2, Southern Taiwan Science Park, Tainan County (Now is merged into Tainan City).
- 2009: February 9~22, Yilan Sports Park, Yilan City, Yilan County.
- 2010: February 28~March 7, Chiayi Park, Chiayi City.
- 2011: February 17~28, Zhunan and Toufen Sports Park, Miaoli County.
- 2012: February 6~19, Lukang Township, Changhua County.
- 2013: February 24~March 10, THSR Hsinchu Station, Zhubei City, Hsinchu County.
- 2014: February 14~23, Zhongxing New Village, Nantou County.
- 2015: March 5~15, THSR Taichung Station, Taichung Park and Fengyuan District, Taichung City.
- 2016: February 22~March 6, THSR Taoyuan Station, Taoyuan City.
- 2017: February 11~19, THSR Yunlin Station, Yunlin County.
- 2018: February 16~March 11, Taibao City, Chiayi County
- 2019: February 19~March 3, Pingtung City, Pingtung County
- 2020: February 8~23, Wen-Hsin Forest Park, Houli Forest Expo Site and Houli Horse Ranch, Taichung City
- 2021: ~~February 26~March 7, Hsinchu City~~ (Canceled)
- 2022: February 1~28, Weiwuying and Love River Bay, Kaohsiung City
- 2023: February 5~19, Xinyi, Taipei City
- 2024: February 3~24 Anping Recreational Wharf and Tainan HSR station, Tainan City
- 2025: February 2~23, Taoyuan City
- 2026: February 3~15 Chiayi County

== Festival meaning ==
Taiwanese people write their wishes on the lanterns with a belief to bring an abundant crop. Women wish for a new son to earn more hands to work. These lanterns fly to the sky, bring their wishes to the gods, and alternatively speak all dreams for them that being blessed with luck and good things.

== Potential environmental harm ==
Though they may be beautiful, even biodegradable lanterns can be incredibly harmful to both the environment and wildlife. Sky lantern litter takes a considerable time to decompose, and the wire frames have been known to strangle and maim wild animals and livestock. They also pose a significant fire hazard.

== Theming ==
The theme of the lanterns often corresponds with the zodiac signs of Chinese astrology. They depict images such as historical figures, birds, or of the theme determined each year. Also, all of them are over 10 metres tall. Since 1999, every main lantern has its own theme music which lasts about 3 minutes in length and plays the rhythm when making performances during the festival.
