= International Trade Administration (Taiwan) =

Government agency of Taiwan

- 經濟部國際貿易署
- Logo of the International Trade Administration

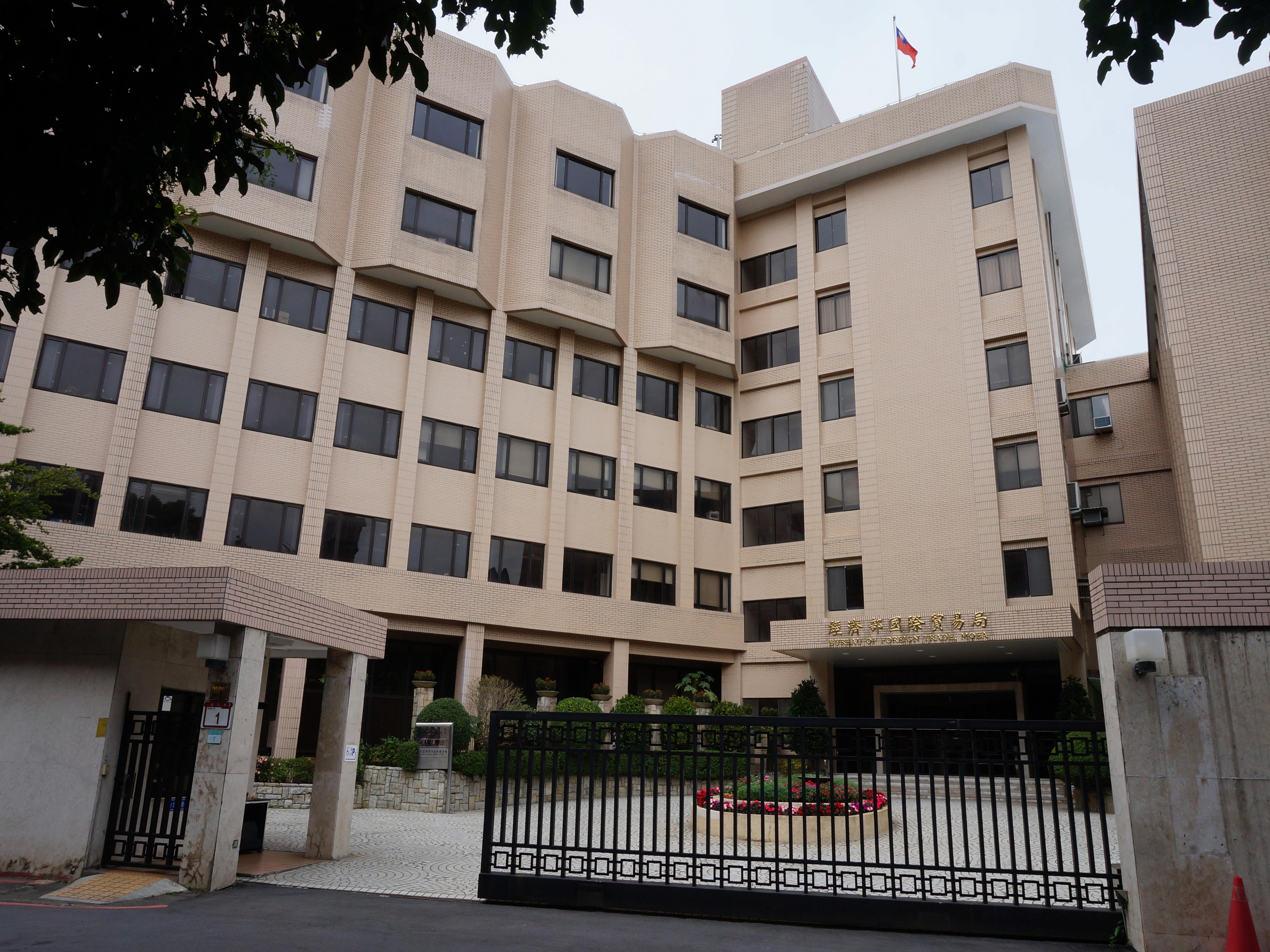
- Headquarters of the International Trade Administration

Agency overview
- Formed: 1955 (as Foreign Exchange and Trade Review Commission); January 1st, 1969 (as BOFT); September 26th, 2023 (as ITA)
- Jurisdiction: Taiwan
- Headquarters: Zhongzheng, Taipei; 25.033261°N 121.514468°E
- Agency executives: Cynthia Kiang, Director-General; Lee Guann-jyh, Liu Chih-hung, Deputy Director-Generals
- Parent agency: Ministry of Economic Affairs
- Website: Official website

The International Trade Administration (ITA; traditional Chinese: 經濟部國際貿易署; simplified Chinese: 经济部国际贸易署) is the administrative agency of the Ministry of Economic Affairs (MOEA) of Taiwan (ROC).

== History ==
In 1955, the Foreign Exchange and Trade Review Commission (Chinese: 行政院外匯貿易審議委員會) was established under the Executive Yuan. In 1968 and 1969, the Executive Yuan reorganized the commission by dividing the authority and operation of the commission among the Ministry of Finance, MOEA and Central Bank of China, respectively. The Bureau of Foreign Trade was subsequently established on January 1, 1969, under the MOEA to administer trade in general commercial goods. It was later renamed as International Trade Administration.

== Organizational structure ==
- Multilateral Trade Affairs Division (including WTO/APEC/GAMS/OECD)
- Bilateral Trade Division I
- Bilateral Trade Division II
- Trade Development Division
- Export/Import Administration Division
- Congressional Liaison Unit
- Planning Committee
- Trade Promotion Fund Management Committee, MOEA
- Office of Trade Security Controls
- Office of Exhibition Center Construction
- Information Management Center
- Accounting Office
- Personnel Office
- Statistics Office
- Kaohsiung Office
- Civil Service Ethics Office

== Transportation ==
BOFT is accessible within walking distance West from Chiang Kai-shek Memorial Hall Station of Taipei Metro.

== Director-Generals ==
- Chang Chun-fu (– August 2014)
- Yang Jen-ni (20 August 2014 – August 2020)
- Cynthia Kiang (August 2020 – present)

== See also ==
- Ministry of Economic Affairs (Taiwan)
