= National Games of the Republic of China =

Multi-sport event in Taiwan

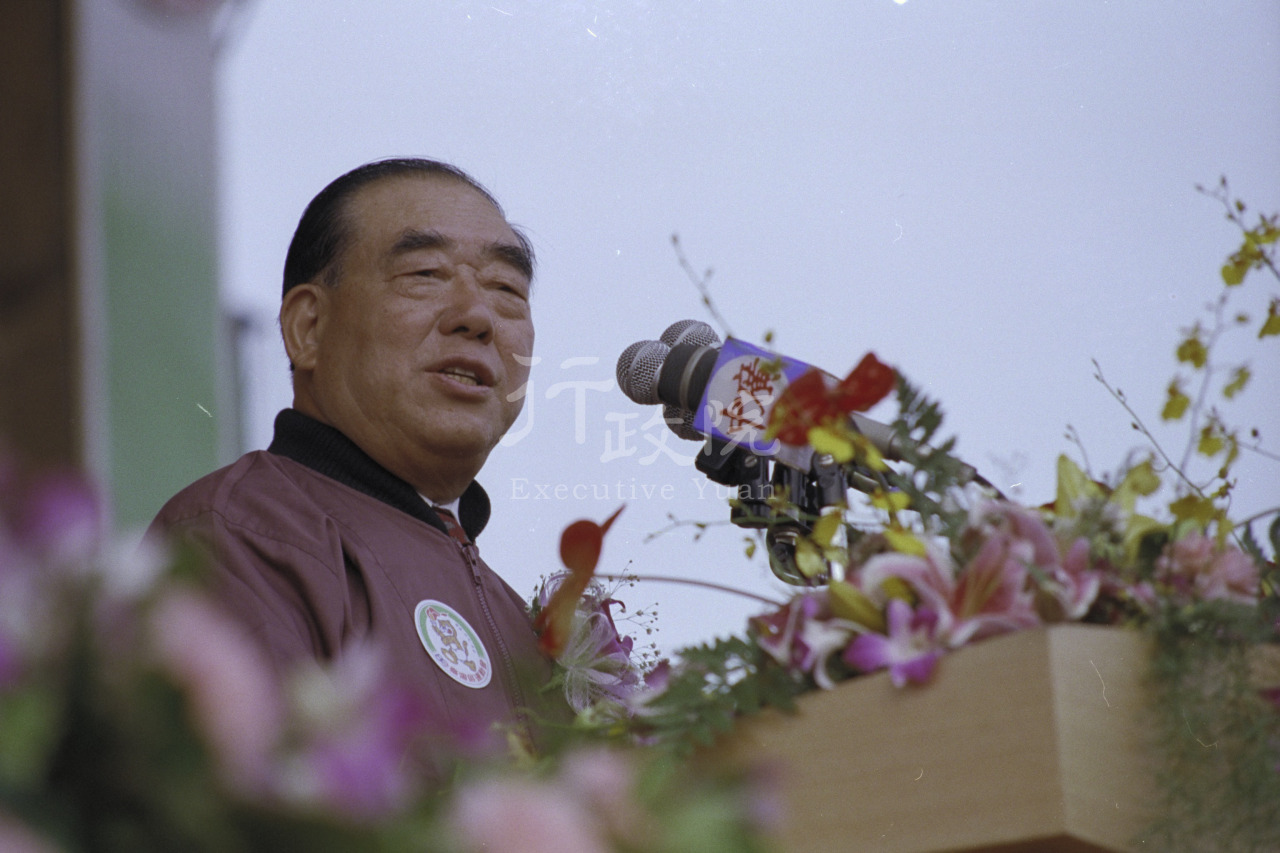
At the opening ceremony of the 1991 Taiwan Sports Games of the Republic of China, Hao Baicun, President of the Executive Yuan, delivered a speech in front of the microphone of Zhongguang News.

The National Games of the Republic of China (referred to as the National Games) is the largest comprehensive sports meeting in terms of scale and level in the Republic of China. They take place every two years. The most recent games took place in Yunlin County in October 2025.

Some Olympic athletes compete in the National Games.

It was first held in the second year of Xuantong in the late Qing Dynasty (1910). Before 1949, due to the turbulent situation, it was held at irregular intervals. By 1948, a total of 7 sessions had been held. During the mainland period of the Republic of China, six sessions were actually held (the first session was ratified after the Revolution of 1911).

The National Games of the Republic of China, currently held in the free areas of the Republic of China, were restructured from the "Taiwan Provincial Games" (referred to as the Taiwan Provincial Games, Provincial Games) and the "Taiwan District Games" (referred to as the Taiwan District Games, District Games), participating delegations are based on municipalities, counties, and cities.

== History ==
The First National Games were held in October in 1910 during the late Qing Dynasty. At that time, it was called the First National Athletic Alliance of Regional Student Teams. It was held and organized by the Shanghai YMCA at the Nanyang Industrial Exposition in Nanjing. Five districts of China were represented (North China, South China, Shanghai, Nanjing/Suzhou and Wuhan) with a total of 140 athletes participating. The Games featured competitions at three different levels: sectional (open to all), intercollegiate, and middle school (ages fifteen to twenty).

In 1914 the Second National Games were held in Beijing, specifically in Tiantian Park. It was now called the First National United Athletic Meet. This time it was organized by the Beijing Athletic Association, which had close ties with the Beijing YMCA. Aside from track, soccer, tennis and basketball, which were in the First Games, baseball and volleyball were also added. The divisions of the competitions into three different levels were abandoned, now the competitions could provide only one winning team. The regional divisions were divided into East, West, North and South.

The Third National Games were held in Wuchang in Wuchang Public Stadium. There were the first Games that were Chinese-run and the last to be associated with the YMCA. The meet featured 527 participating athletes from thirteen Chinese provinces and a Manila Chinese YMCA team. Women’s sporting events were also included for the first time in basketball, softball and volleyball. However, they could only participate in special “female” adaptations of these sports and not in the main competitions.
