= David Hsu =

US planner, educator, and engineer

David Hsu is a planner, educator, and engineer. Currently, Hsu is Associate Professor of Urban and Environmental Planning in the Department of Urban Studies and Planning at the Massachusetts Institute of Technology. While Hsu's research interests are vast and varied, spanning from design and planning to governance, policy, and infrastructure, his current work primarily focuses on helping policymakers shape environmental policy and policy implementation.

David Hsu grew up in Amherst, Massachusetts.

== Education ==
David Hsu holds a Ph.D in urban design and planning from the University of Washington, Seattle, from which he also earned a certificate in social science and statistics. He earned a Master of Science in applied and engineering physics from Cornell University, and a Master of Science in city design and social science from the London School of Economics and Political Science. Hsu received a Bachelor of Science in physics from Yale University.

== Career ==
Hsu worked in engineering, finance, and for the cities of New York and Seattle. Prior to MIT, Hsu was an assistant professor in the Department of City & Regional Planning at the University of Pennsylvania. He was also an adjunct professor at New York University.

== Awards ==
- 2012-2013 Fulbright Regional Network for Applied Research (NEXUS) Scholar
