= Qiding =

Qiding may refer to:

- Qiding railway station, a railway station on the Taiwan Railways Administration West Coast line
- Qiding Tunnels, two former railway tunnels
- Qiding Village (崎頂里), Longci District, Tainan, Taiwan
- Qiding Village (崎頂里), Zhunan, Miaoli, Taiwan
