= 2012 Taiwan Railways sex party scandal =

2012 controversy in Taiwan

TRA Train Sex Party Case
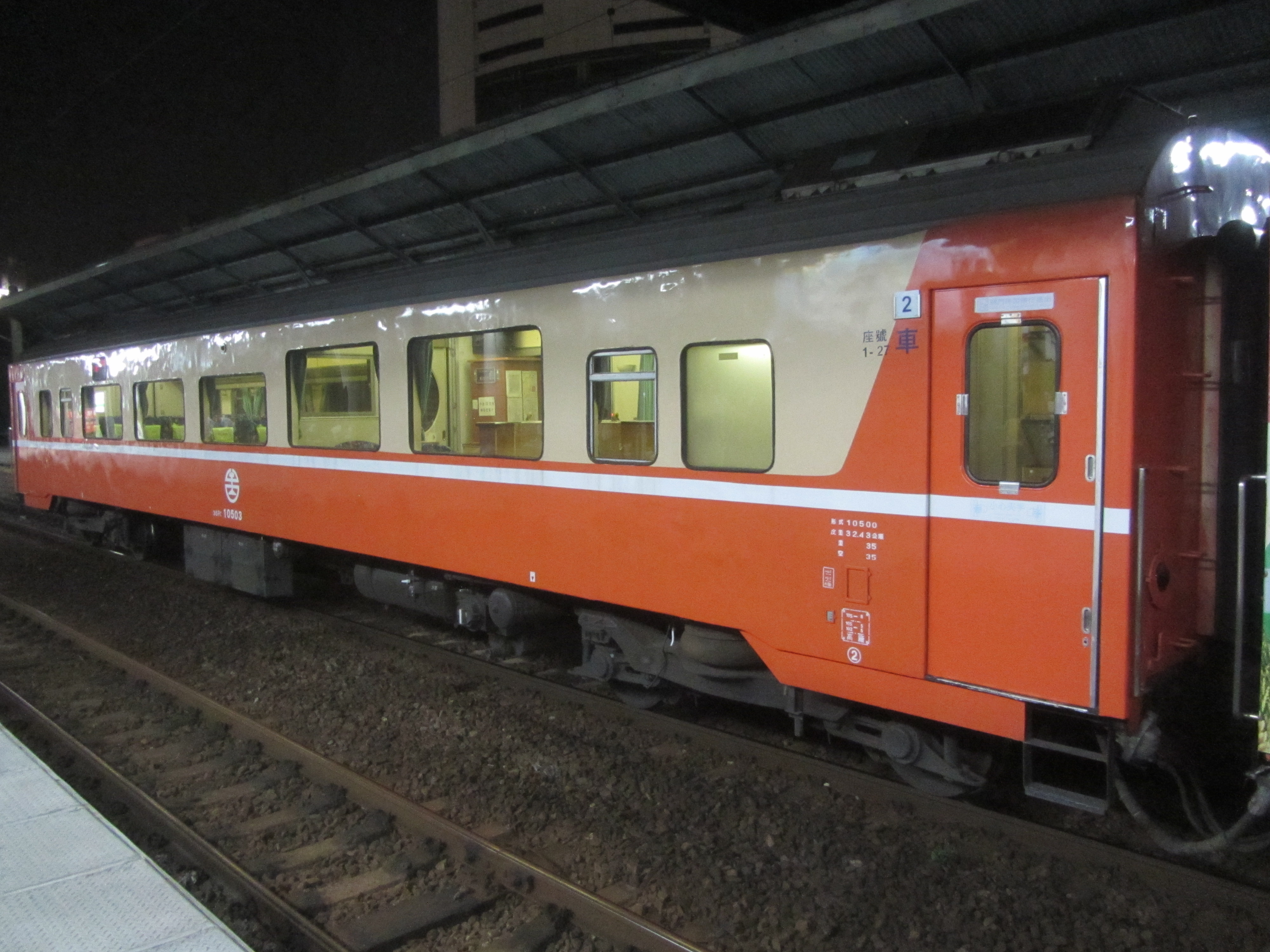
- A TRA lounge car
- Date: 19 February 2012
- Location: TaiwanTRA Western Line (Northern Section), en route from Taipei Station to Zhunan StationTRA lounge car
- Caused by: Imitation of pornographic films
- Goals: Sexual gratificationSense of achievement
- Methods: Group sex party ∟Vaginal intercourse ∟Oral sex ∟Masturbation
- Result: Organizer Tsai Yu-lin was sentenced to six months in prison and ordered to publish apology notices in four newspapers.The male participants who engaged in sexual intercourse were not prosecuted.The female participant, "Xiao Yu", was placed in an emergency shelter and received psychological counseling.

Casualties
- Arrested: 19
- Detained: 2
- Charged: 1

The Taiwan Railways Group Sex Case refers to an incident in which Tsai Yu-lin and others came under media attention and police investigation after participating in a train sex party on 19 February 2012. The incident involved controversies concerning sexual consent, sexual privacy, law, and public morality, and prompted the Taiwan Railways Administration under the Ministry of Transportation and Communications to revise its carriage rental contract.

The sex party was initiated by Tsai Yu-lin, who first posted an invitation on a BBS in November 2011 to invite netizens to participate. The following year, the event was successfully organized after a woman claiming to be 20 years old joined, and a lounge car was rented from Taiwan Railways. On the day of the event, participants first gathered at Taipei Main Station. After boarding the lounge car, they requested that Taiwan Railways employees leave. Details were then explained and supplies distributed, after which the sex party officially began. During the party, nearly half to more than half of the men who had indicated during registration that they intended to engage in sexual activity had sexual intercourse, while the remainder masturbated. Afterward, the participants restored the carriage to its original condition and cleaned it. The men who had registered to engage in sexual activity then dispersed, while Tsai Yu-lin and other organizers went to a pasta restaurant to celebrate.

After the sex party was reported by media outlets including Apple Daily （Taiwan）on 24 February, it sparked public debate, and the police began investigating the incident and summoned participants for questioning. Investigators discovered that the only female participant who had engaged in sexual activity was actually 17 years old. Following court proceedings, all eighteen men who had registered to engage in sexual activity received Not to prosecute decisions due to insufficient evidence. Tsai Yu-lin, however, was convicted of profiting from the mediation of sexual intercourse and sentenced to six months' imprisonment, which could be commute a sentence to a fine of 180,000 New Taiwan dollars Tsai later appealed the verdict, but the court upheld the original judgment.

== Background ==
In November 2011, Tsai Yu-lin posted an article titled Electric Train Molester on the BBS forum "Huakui Art Gallery", calling on netizens to attend a sex party modeled after Japanese pornographic films and choosing a railway carriage as the venue. However, due to the lack of female participants willing to engage in sexual activity, the event was not successfully organized until the following year, when a netizen using the name "rainyfull" ("Xiaoyu"), who claimed to be 20 years old, signed up. Before the party, Tsai Yu-lin prepared a proposal in advance and charged participants an admission fee of NT$800. A total of 27 people were recruited, though two ultimately withdrew out of fear, reducing the number of participants to 25, including 22 men and three women. Among them, 18 men stated during registration that they intended to engage in sexual activity, while four people, including Tsai Yu-lin, were responsible for acting as lookouts and hosting the event.[1] The two women served as assistants.

After successfully gathering participants, Tsai Yu-lin submitted an application to Taiwan Railways on 1 February, requesting to charter a Parlor Car attached to a Chu-kuang Express train on the Taipei–Zhunan route on 19 February. Taiwan Railways processed and approved the application in accordance with regulations.

On 19 February, participants gathered at Taipei Main Station wearing suits, as requested by Tsai Yu-lin, and verified their identities using registration slips. After everyone had arrived, their belongings were inspected to ensure that no prohibited drugs or recording equipment were being brought on board.

== Course of events ==
After the participants boarded the lounge car, the conductor entered once to conduct an inspection. During this time, the participants informed him that they were holding a meeting and requested not to be disturbed, further asking the service staff assigned to the carriage to leave. The conductor agreed. After they had departed, Tsai Yu-lin, acting as host, explained the rules of the sex party, including that sexual positions were unrestricted, that the safety code word would be "maltose", and that condoms had to be worn at all times. Following the explanation, the two female assistants distributed mouthwash and condoms to participants before announcing the beginning of the sex party. To ensure that the party proceeded smoothly, the lounge car was locked. Although some reports claimed that the curtains were half-drawn when the train arrived at stations and otherwise kept open, Tsai Yu-lin denied that the curtains had ever been opened. In addition, anti-hidden-camera detectors were installed inside the train.

After the party began, none of the participants initially dared to take part. Tsai Yu-lin therefore took the lead by sexually teasing Xiaoyu, encouraging other participants to join in. During the party, nearly half to more than half of the men who had stated during registration that they intended to engage in sexual activity had sexual intercourse with Xiaoyu, and oral sex and nipple stimulation were also performed. The remaining participants masturbated. Xiaoyu later stated that she "could not remember the exact number of people who had had sexual intercourse with her". Throughout the event, the female assistants continued distributing sanitary supplies. These male participants generally later stated that Xiaoyu had been highly cooperative during the party and had never once uttered the safety code word, although one person accidentally stepped on her foot during the event.

Afterward, the participants restored the carriage to its original condition and cleaned it,[7] with train staff discovering nothing unusual when inspecting the carriage. The men who had registered to engage in sexual activity then dispersed.

== Celebration afterwards ==
After the event, the host and six participants went to an Italian restaurant near Zhunan railway station to celebrate. The meal expenses and return train fares were paid for using the money collected from participants.

== Media coverage ==
On 24 February, Democratic Progressive Party legislator Yeh Yi-chin disclosed to Apple Daily (Taiwan) that many users on BBS forums had been sharing and describing the sex party. Apple Daily subsequently reported on the event under the headline "Taiwan Railways Train Sex Party", publishing excerpts from BBS posts, after which major media outlets reproduced the story. The reports sparked public controversy and online discussion.

== Investigation ==
Following the incident, the Railway Police Bureau, National Police Agency, Ministry of the Interior (Taiwan) inspected the carriage and collected evidence, but failed to find any physical traces, including fingerprints, bodily fluids, or sweat. Investigators concluded that the participants had cleaned the scene using alcohol and disinfectants. Huakui Art Gallery closed its website on 25 February and refused to cooperate with the police investigation. Before that, however, the police had already identified the IP addresses of the organizer and Xiaoyu and summoned the participants for questioning. On the following day, Tsai Yu-lin and other participants met in Ximending, claiming that they intended to "turn themselves in to the police". On 27 February, Tsai Yu-lin was arrested by police at Zhongxiao Fuxing Station of the Taipei Metro while on his way to an interview with electronic media. Other participants subsequently reported to the authorities.

At the same time, a netizen claiming to be Xiaoyu's former boyfriend called the police and provided information, stating that Xiaoyu was "Sexual addiction and frequently cheated on partners … I was deeply hurt by her", and supplied her personal information for further investigation. However, no clinical diagnostic criteria have ever included sex addiction as a recognized condition. The ICD-11 only includes compulsive sexual behavior disorder, which requires that the behavior persist despite adverse consequences or little or no satisfaction, without taking moral disapproval or social condemnation into account. Xiaoyu appeared before the authorities on the morning of 28 February. Police also discovered that Xiaoyu was a 17-year-old school dropout.

== Court rulings ==
=== First instance ===
Apart from one minor who was referred to the juvenile court, all others were investigated by the Taiwan New Taipei District Prosecutors Office on suspicion of offenses against public morals and violations of the Child and Youth Sexual Transaction Prevention Act. The participants were later granted non-prosecution due to insufficient evidence. However, the Railway Police Bureau fined 18 individuals NT$1,500 each under the Social Order Maintenance Act.

The organizer, Tsai Yu-lin, was convicted of "profiting from the mediation of sexual intercourse" because of his intention to make a profit, and was sentenced to six months' imprisonment, which could be commuted to a fine of NT$180,000.

The judgment held that Tsai's purchase of surveillance and cleaning supplies had monetary value, that these items remained in his possession after the event, and that he had not refunded the remaining funds to participants, thereby demonstrating an intent to profit. It further found that he had "engaged in acts of introducing persons for sexual intercourse", thereby constituting a "mediator". The court stated that he had "caused considerable harm to social morals and customs, and considering his attitude after the offense and all other circumstances, the prosecutor's specific request for a six-month prison sentence is appropriate". In addition, the court ordered him to publish an apology in four major newspapers in Taiwan.

After the verdict, Tsai Yu-lin expressed dissatisfaction, stating that "this activity only made a profit of a few dozen dollars and there was no intention to profit". On 29 April 2013, he filed an appeal together with the Collective of Sex Workers and Supporters (COSWAS), the Taiwan Gender/Sexuality Rights Association, and other organizations at the Taiwan New Taipei District Court.

=== Second instance ===
On 12 September 2013, the Taiwan High Court rendered its judgment, upholding the original ruling and dismissing Tsai Yu-lin's appeal.

== Reactions ==
Following media coverage, the incident attracted widespread attention from internet users. Some netizens stated on online forums that they had previously seen similar posts but never expected such an event to actually take place. Others remarked that they would no longer dare to sit on train seats, fearing contamination by semen or vaginal secretions. However, some argued that there was nothing to criticize because the activities had been consensual.

Within five days after Apple Daily reported the incident, Chi Hui-jung, executive director of the Garden of Hope Foundation ，said that the incident was heartbreaking and suggested that schools should strengthen sex education so that the next generation would develop proper values. Hong Ling of the Center for Humanities and Social Sciences at National Chung Hsing University later criticized these remarks in the Taiwan: A Radical Quarterly in Social Studies, arguing that they "distorted Xiaoyu into an ignorant, animalistic, lower-class/non-human positionality". Hsu Ya-fei of the Department of International and Mainland China Affairs at Nanhua University wrote in the same journal that "judging from the handling process of the Taiwan Railways public incident, whether in terms of protective placement under the Child and Youth Act or offenses against public morals under the Criminal Code, the deprivation of the basic rights of sexual minorities has become concretized in people's everyday lives".

Yang Tsung-tsai, a senior psychiatrist at Hsin-Tien Cathay General Hospital, suggested that Xiaoyu might suffer from sex addiction and that feelings of instability in life and interpersonal relationships had driven her to use sex to fill an emotional void. This assertion was criticized by Huang Sung-chu of the Department of Philosophy at National Chung Cheng University, who argued that it violated medical ethics. Psychiatrist Lee Kuang-hui of the Stress Relief Clinic at Chung-Hsin Hospital suggested that Xiaoyu might have sought experiences different from those of her peers in order to gain a sense of achievement, and that her previous unpleasant sexual experiences may have prompted her to affirm herself through participation in sex parties.

Kao Sung-ching, executive director of the Taiwan Association for Sexuality Education, argued that if all parties had consented and no laws or public interests had been violated, their sexual privacy should be respected. However, he also stated that the train sex party merely pursued excitement and gratification, and that if the female participant had indeed been a minor, greater care and understanding would be required. The Center for the Study of Sexualities at National Central University, the Cultural Studies Association of the Republic of China, and the Taiwan Gender/Sexuality Rights Associationissued a joint statement declaring that "what was originally a private activity built upon informed consent and rational agreement among participants has been maliciously demonized by leaks … all parties involved have suffered pressure from the judicial and police authorities as well as pain in family and romantic relationships, while certain groups have attempted to use the incident as an excuse to further restrict freedom of expression on the internet".

The Taiwan Alliance for Advancement of Youth Rights and Welfareconsidered the incident to be a valuable opportunity for young people to understand sex-related laws and avoid unintentionally violating them. Kuomintang legislator Wang Yu-min stated that the case revealed deficiencies in child and youth legislation and that amendments should be considered.
