= Nangang River =

River in Taiwan

Coordinates: 24°39′55″N 120°52′03″E

Nangang River（Traditional Chinese：南港溪）is located in Miaoli County, Taiwan. It is a tributary of the Zhonggang River, which is under central management. The river basin includes Zaoqiao Township, Zhunan Township, Toufen City, Sanwan Township, Nanzhuang Township, and Shitan Township in Miaoli County. Nangang River originates from the southwestern slope of Shenzhuo Mountain at an elevation of 762 metres (2,500 ft) in Baishou Village, Shitan Township. It flows north to Dahedi in Sanwan Township, then turns southwest to Nanpingjiao It flows into Zhonggang River at Tanwen. The river is 28.89 kilometres (17.95 mi) long, with a basin area of 69.5 square kilometres (26.8 sq mi).
