= Tanwen =

Tanwen may refer to:

- Tanwen railway station, a railway station on the Taiwan Railways Administration West Coast line
- Tanwen Village (談文村), Zaoqiao, Miaoli County, Taiwan
