= Zhonggang Cihyu Temple =

Temple in Zhunan, Miaoli County, Taiwan

- 中港慈裕宮
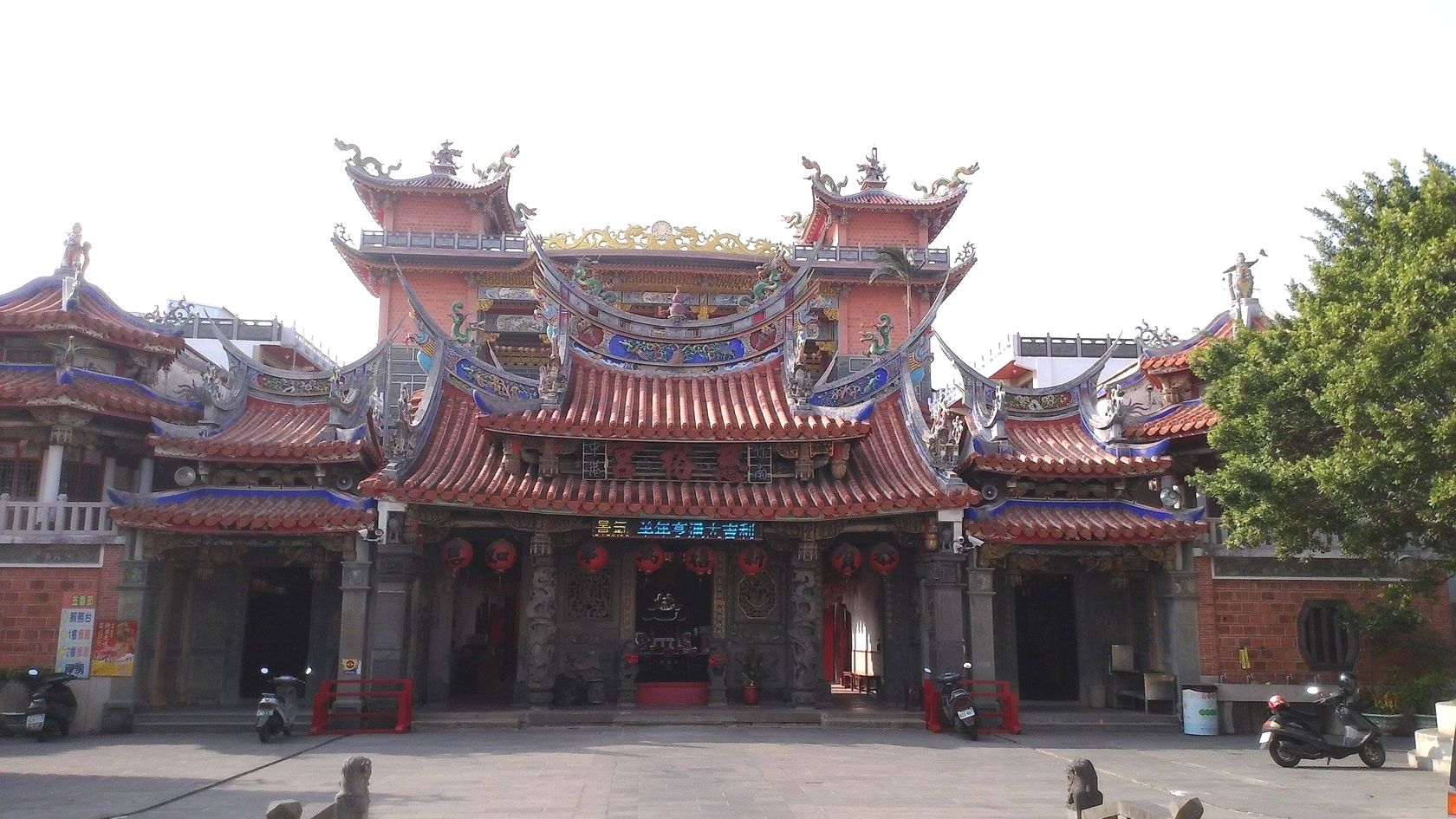

- Location within Miaoli County

Religion
- Affiliation: Taoism

Location
- Location: Zhunan, Miaoli County, Taiwan
- Interactive map of Zhonggang Cihyu Temple
- Coordinates: 24°40′57.0″N 120°51′49.5″E

Architecture
- Type: temple
- Completed: 1685

The Zhonggang Cihyu Temple (Chinese: 中港慈裕宮; pinyin: Zhōnggǎng Cíyù Gōng) is a Chinese temple dedicated to the Goddess Mazu, who is the Goddess of Sea and Patron Deity of fishermen, sailors and any occupations related to sea/ocean. It is located in Zhunan Township, Miaoli County, Taiwan and is also the oldest Matsu temple in Miaoli county.

== History ==
The temple was first constructed in 1685 and was rebuilt in 1783. It was listed as third-class historical building by the Ministry of the Interior in 1985.

== Transportation ==
The temple is accessible within walking distance west of Zhunan Station of Taiwan Railway.

== See also ==
- Qianliyan & Shunfeng'er
- List of Mazu temples around the world
- List of temples in Taiwan
- List of tourist attractions in Taiwan
