= Qiding Tunnels =

Former railway tunnel in Zhunan, Miaoli County, Taiwan

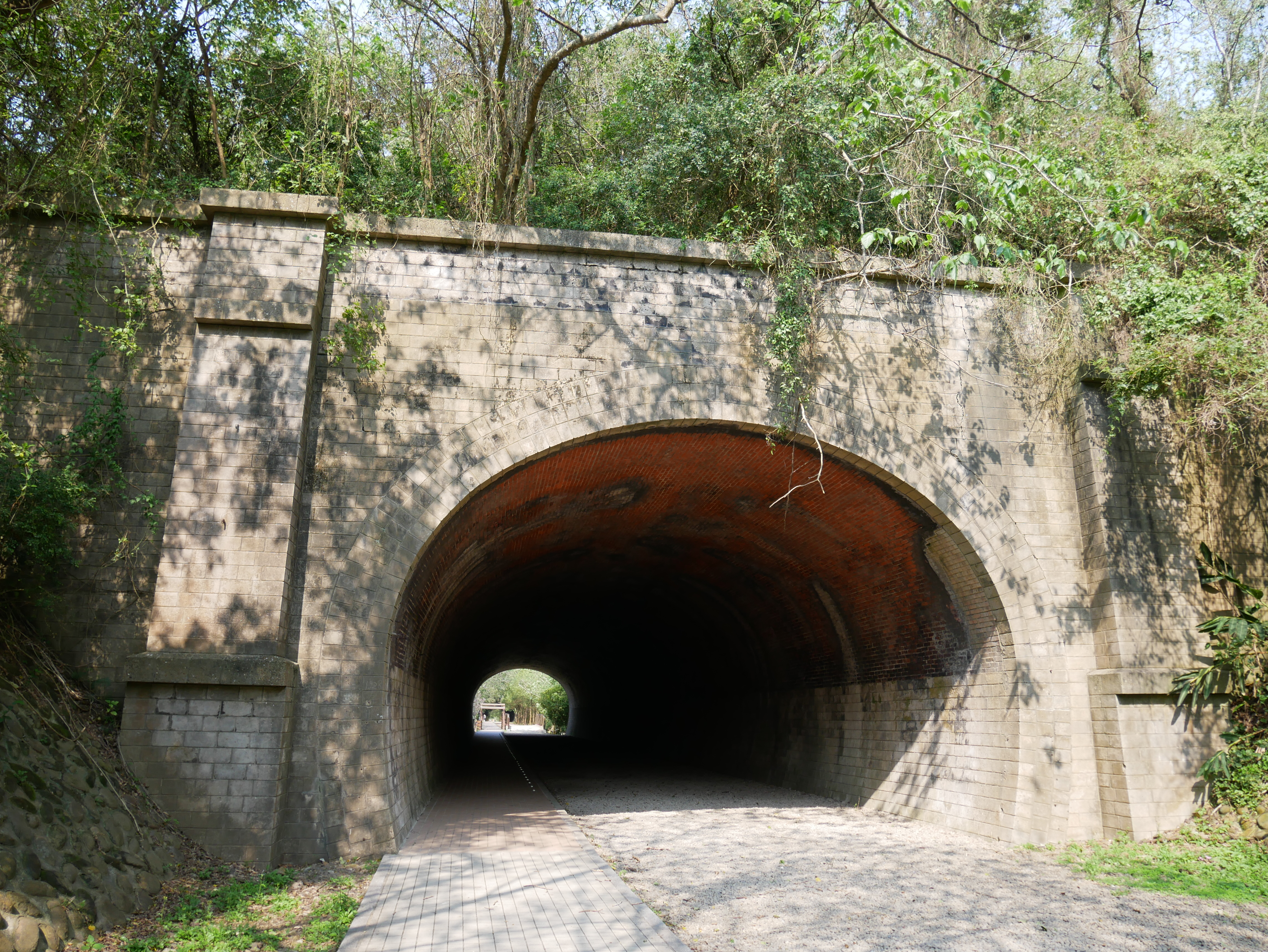
- Interactive map of Qiding Tunnels

Overview
- Official name: 崎頂一、二號隧道
- Location: Zhunan, Miaoli County, Taiwan
- Coordinates: 24°43′36.5″N 120°52′30.9″E

The Qiding Tunnels (traditional Chinese: 崎頂一、二號隧道; simplified Chinese: 崎顶一、二号隧道; pinyin: Qídǐng Yī, Èr Hào Suìdào) are two former railway tunnels in Zhunan Township, Miaoli County, Taiwan.

== History ==
The two tunnels were built during the Japanese rule of Taiwan. During the World War II, one of the tunnel wall was damaged by bomb. In 2005, the tunnels were listed as historical site.

== Architecture ==
The tunnels were built with red brick for their interior walls. There are also many holes found inside one of the tunnels caused by gun fight during the Second World War.

== Transportation ==
The tunnels are accessible within walking distance northeast of Qiding Station of Taiwan Railway.

== See also ==
- List of tourist attractions in Taiwan
