= Longfeng Fishing Port =

Fishing port in Zhunan, Miaoli County, Taiwan

Longfeng Fishing Port 龍鳳漁港
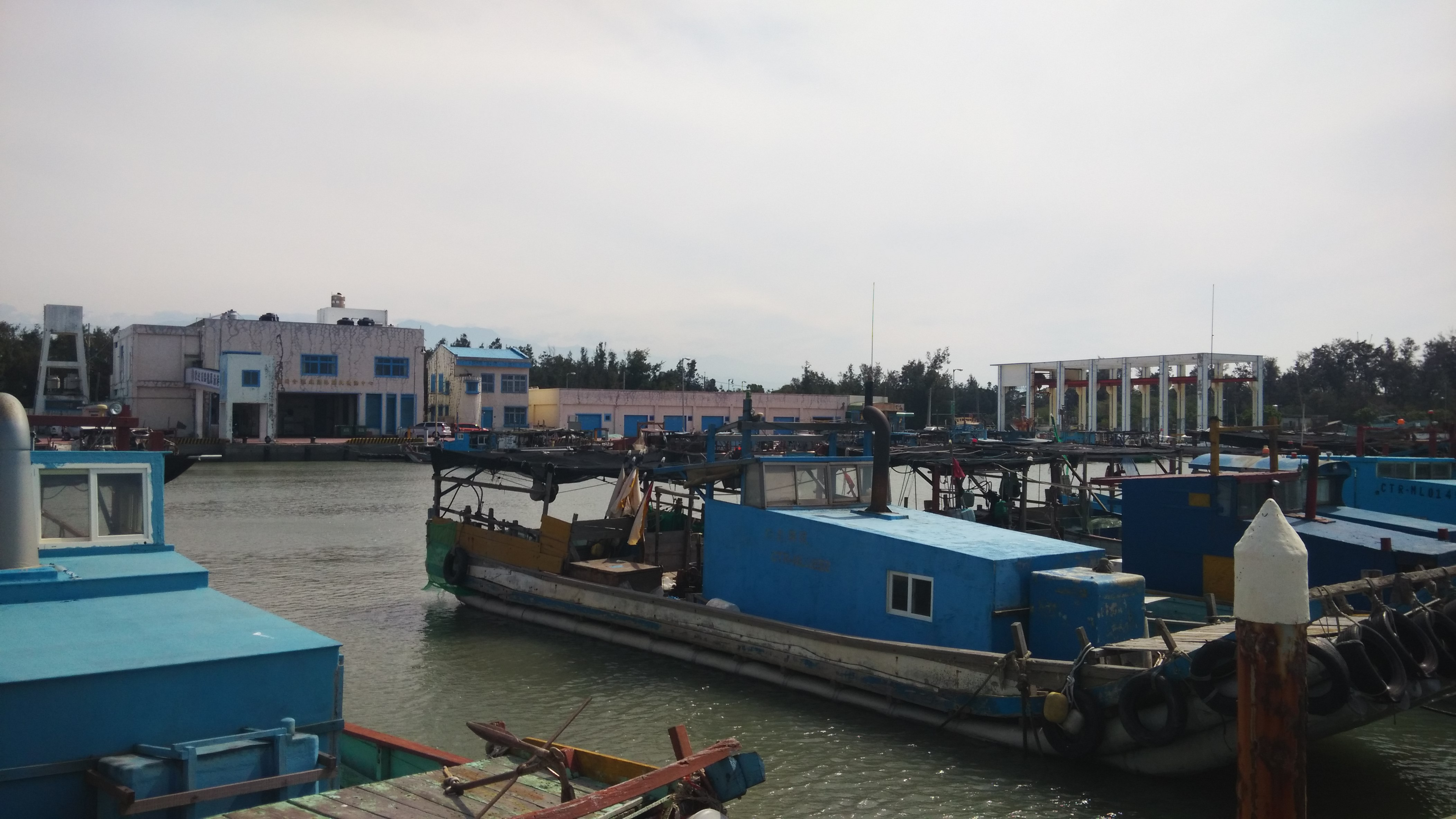
- Interactive map of Longfeng Fishing Port 龍鳳漁港
- Location within Taiwan

Location
- Location: Zhunan, Miaoli County, Taiwan
- Coordinates: 24°42′00.0″N 120°51′25.4″E

Details
- Type of Harbor: fishing port

The Longfeng Fishing Port (traditional Chinese: 龍鳳漁港; simplified Chinese: 龙凤渔港; pinyin: Lóngfèng Yúgǎng) is a fish harbor in Zhunan Township, Miaoli County, Taiwan.

== History ==
The steel bridge which spans over the port was constructed in 2008.

== Geology ==
The sea offshore of the port contains many reefs, making it an area rich of fish population of different species.

== Architecture ==
The port also features a steel bridge and fish market which opens every first weekend of the month.

== See also ==
- Fisheries Agency
