= Zaoqiao railway station =

Railway station in Miaoli, Taiwan

Zaoqiao Station 造橋車站
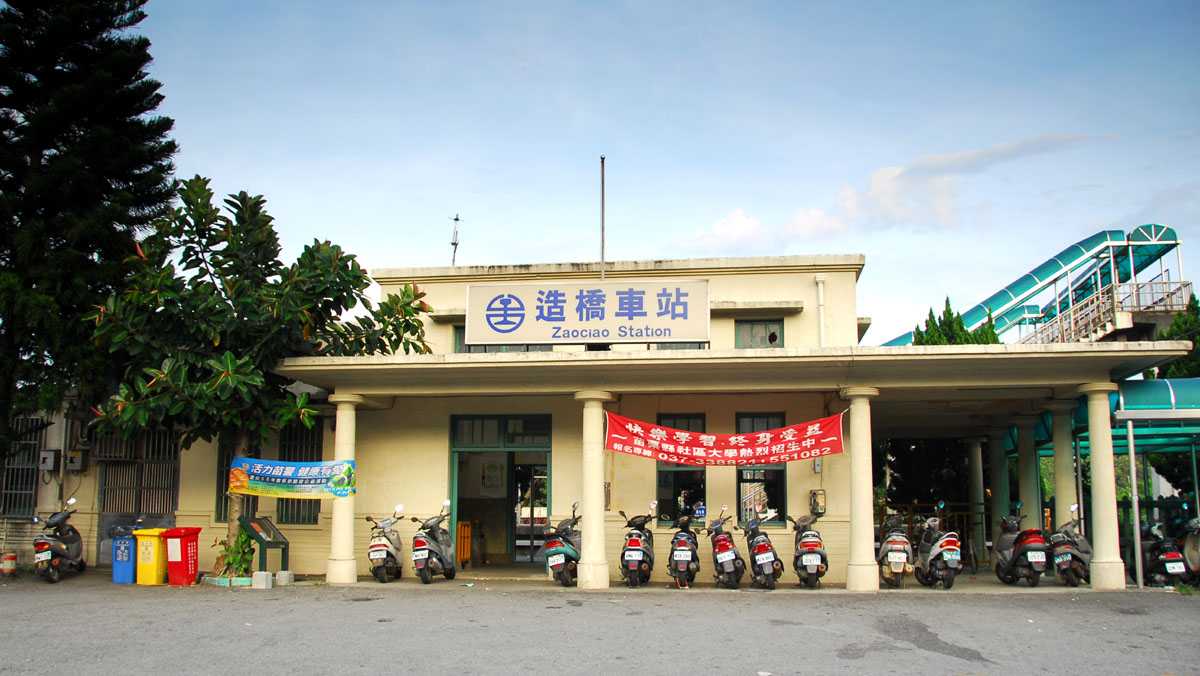

General information
- Location: Zaoqiao, Miaoli County, Taiwan
- Coordinates: 24°38′31.08″N 120°52′3.42″E
- System: Railway station
- Owner: Taiwan Railway Corporation
- Operator: Taiwan Railway Corporation
- Line: Taichung
- Train operators: Taiwan Railway Corporation

History
- Opened: 7 October 1903

Passengers
- 736 daily (2024)

Services
Preceding station	Taiwan Railway	Following station
Zhunan towards Keelung	Western Trunk line	Fengfu towards Kaohsiung
Location

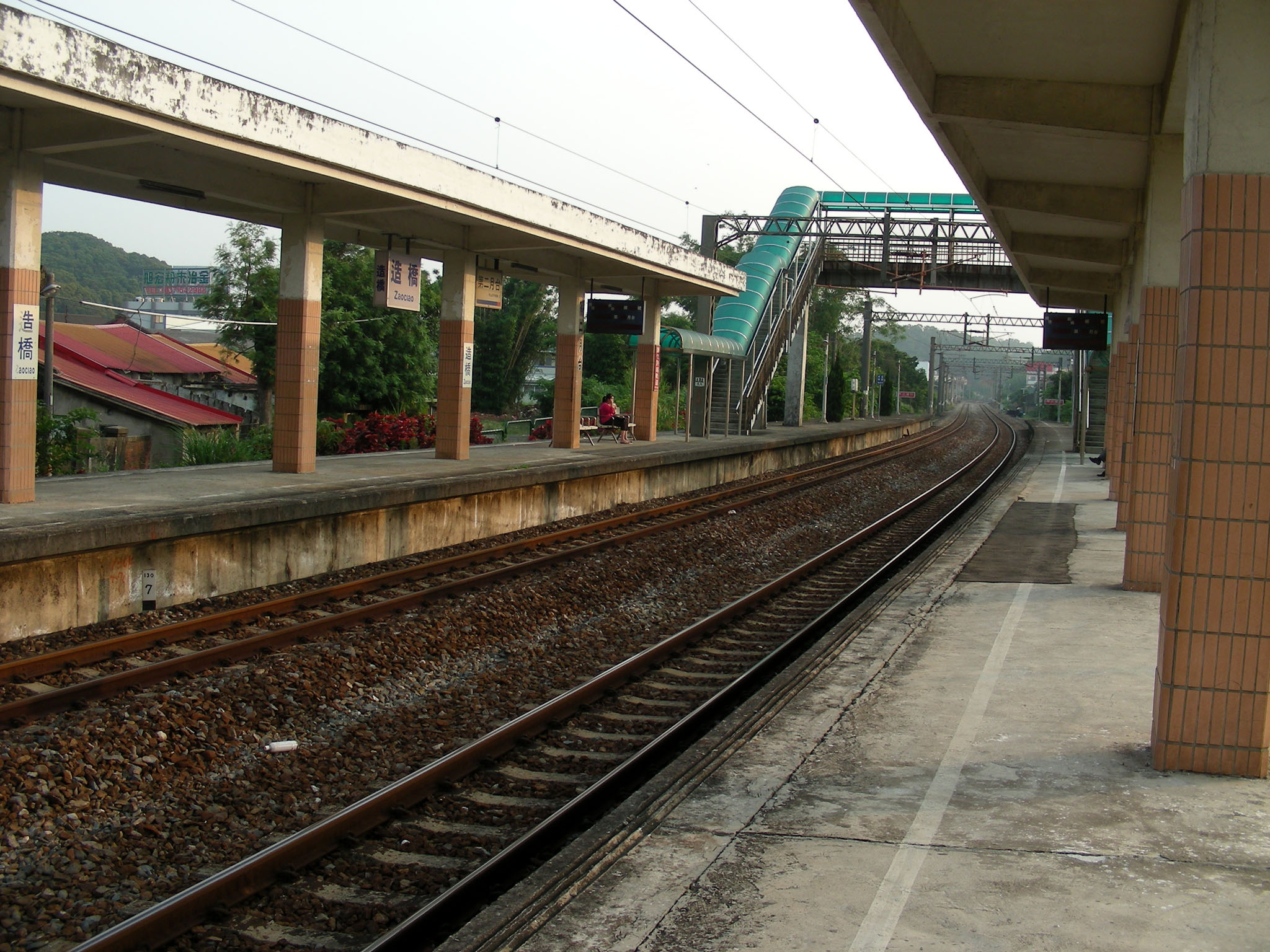
Zaoqiao station platform

Zaoqiao (Chinese: 造橋車站; Hanyu Pinyin: Zàoqiáo Chēzhàn; Tongyong Pinyin: Zàociáo Chejhàn) is a railway station on the Taiwan Railway Taichung line located in Zaoqiao Township, Miaoli County, Taiwan.

== History ==
The station was opened on 7 October 1903.

== See also ==
- List of railway stations in Taiwan
