= Triangle Rush Exhibition Hall =

Gallery in Yuanli, Miaoli County, Taiwan

- 藺草文化館
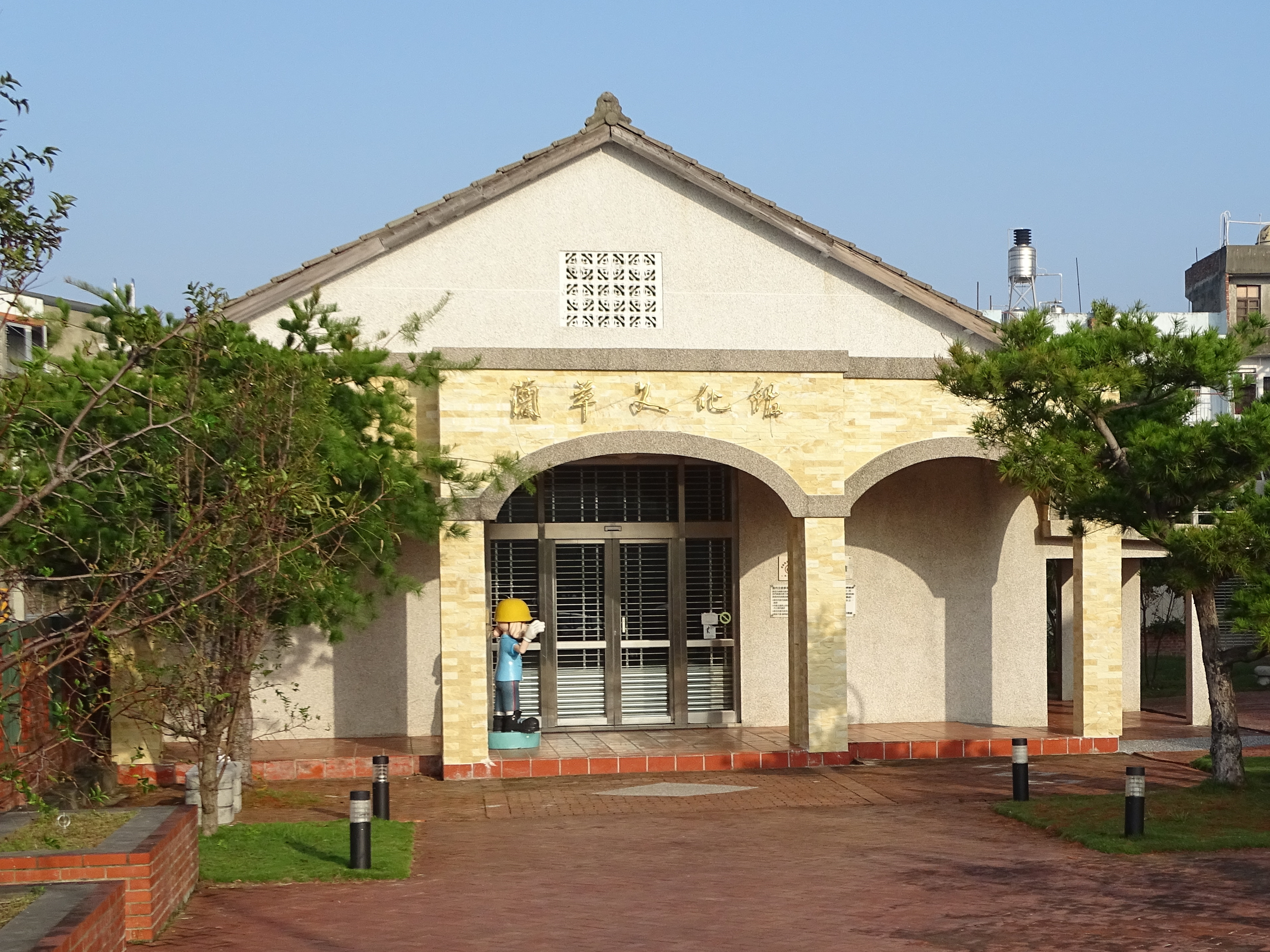
- Interactive map of the Triangle Rush Exhibition Hall area

General information
- Type: gallery
- Location: Yuanli, Miaoli County, Taiwan
- Coordinates: 24°24′51.8″N 120°41′08.3″E

Technical details
- Floor area: 330 m^{2}

Website
- Official website (in Chinese)

The Triangle Rush Exhibition Hall (traditional Chinese: 藺草文化館; simplified Chinese: 蔺草文化馆; pinyin: Lìncǎo Wénhuàguǎn) is a gallery about rush in Yuanli Township, Miaoli County, Taiwan.

== History ==
The gallery was established by the Farmers' Association of Yuanli Township by converting an idle warehouse of the association.

== Architecture ==
The gallery spans over an area of 330 m^{2} and made from red bricks. It consists of the hat and mat culture area, exhibition area, rural ancient cultural relics display area, rice culture area and the folk culture area. It also features the hat and mat weaving demonstration zones and DIY classrooms.

== See also ==
- List of museums in Taiwan
