= Zaochiao Charcoal Museum =

Museum in Zaoqiao, Miaoli County, Taiwan

- 造橋木炭博物館
- Location: Zaoqiao, Miaoli County, Taiwan
- Coordinates: 24°38′09″N 120°52′33″E
- Type: museum
- Website: charcoal.58resort.com.tw

The Zaochiao Charcoal Museum (traditional Chinese: 造橋木炭博物館; simplified Chinese: 造桥木炭博物馆; pinyin: Zàoqiáo Mùtàn Bówùguǎn) is a museum about charcoal in Zaoqiao Township, Miaoli County, Taiwan.

== Architecture ==
The museum building is a two-story building. The first floor is the meeting room, shop, DIY charcoal art area, charcoal art display area and a café. The second floor is the themed exhibition area.

== Exhibition ==
- Charcoal science
- Charcoal history
- Future of charcoal exploration
- Charcoal and health

== See also ==
- List of museums in Taiwan
