= Qiding railway station =

Railway station located in Miaoli, Taiwan

Qiding Station 崎頂車站
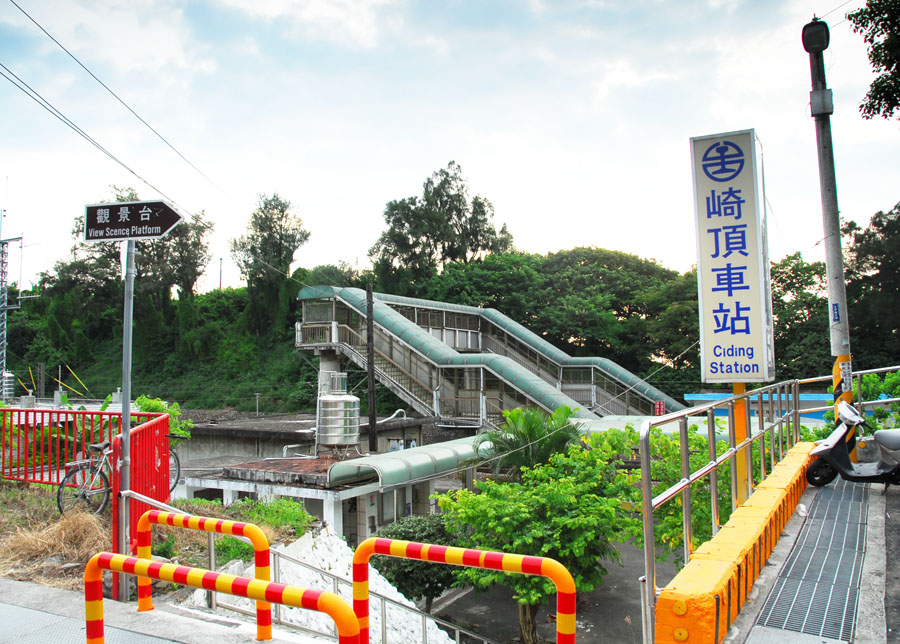

Chinese name
- Traditional Chinese: 崎頂車站
Transcriptions
Standard Mandarin
- Hanyu Pinyin: Qídǐng Chēzhàn
- Bopomofo: ㄑㄧˊ ㄉㄧㄥˇ ㄔㄜ ㄓㄢˋ

General information
- Location: Zhunan, Miaoli; Taiwan
- Coordinates: 24°43′22.5″N 120°52′18.7″E
- System: Taiwan Railway railway station
- Line: West Coast line
- Distance: 120.8 km to Keelung
- Platforms: 2 side platforms

Construction
- Structure type: At-grade

Other information
- Station code: 117

History
- Opened: 12 March 1928

Passengers
- 2017: 74,342 per year
- Rank: 152

Services
Preceding station	Taiwan Railway	Following station
Xiangshan towards Keelung	Western Trunk line	Zhunan towards Kaohsiung
Location

Qiding railway station (Chinese: 崎頂車站; pinyin: Qídǐng Chēzhàn) is a railway station located in Zhunan Township, Miaoli County, Taiwan. It is located on the West Coast line and is operated by Taiwan Railway.

== Around the station ==
- Qiding Tunnels
