= Tanwen railway station =

Railway station in Miaoli, Taiwan

Tanwen Station 談文車站
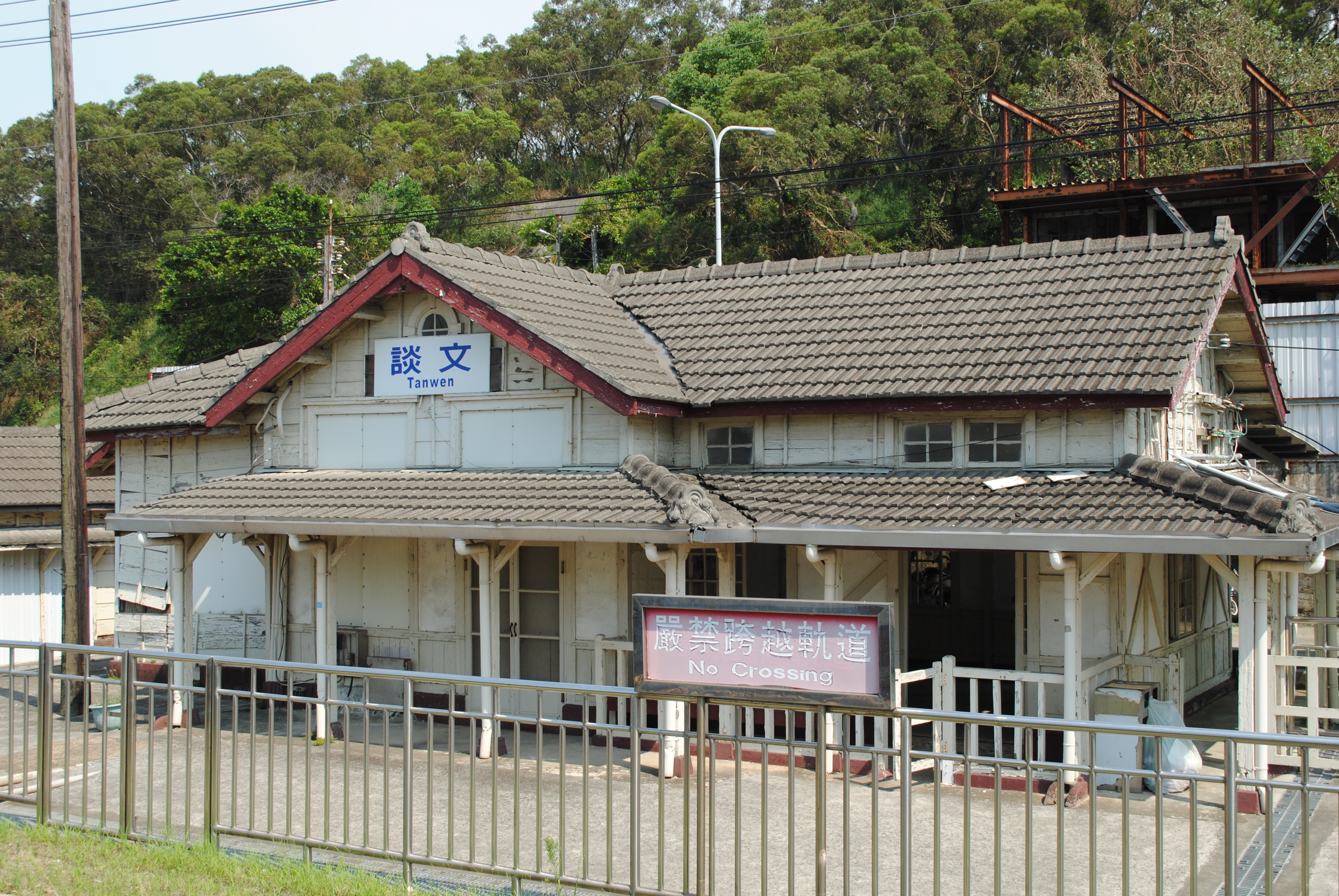

General information
- Location: Zaoqiao, Miaoli County, Taiwan
- Coordinates: 24°39′22.86″N 120°51′28.32″E
- System: Train station
- Owner: Taiwan Railway
- Operator: Taiwan Railway
- Line: Western Trunk line
- Train operators: Taiwan Railway

History
- Opened: 11 October 1922

Passengers
- 98 daily (2024)

Services
Preceding station	Taiwan Railway	Following station
Zhunan Terminus	Western Trunk line (coastal)	Dashan towards Changhua
Location

Tanwen (Chinese: 談文車站; Hanyu Pinyin: Tánwén Chēzhàn; Tongyong Pinyin: Tánwún Chejhàn) is a railway station on Taiwan Railway West Coast line (Coastal line) located in Zaoqiao Township, Miaoli County, Taiwan.

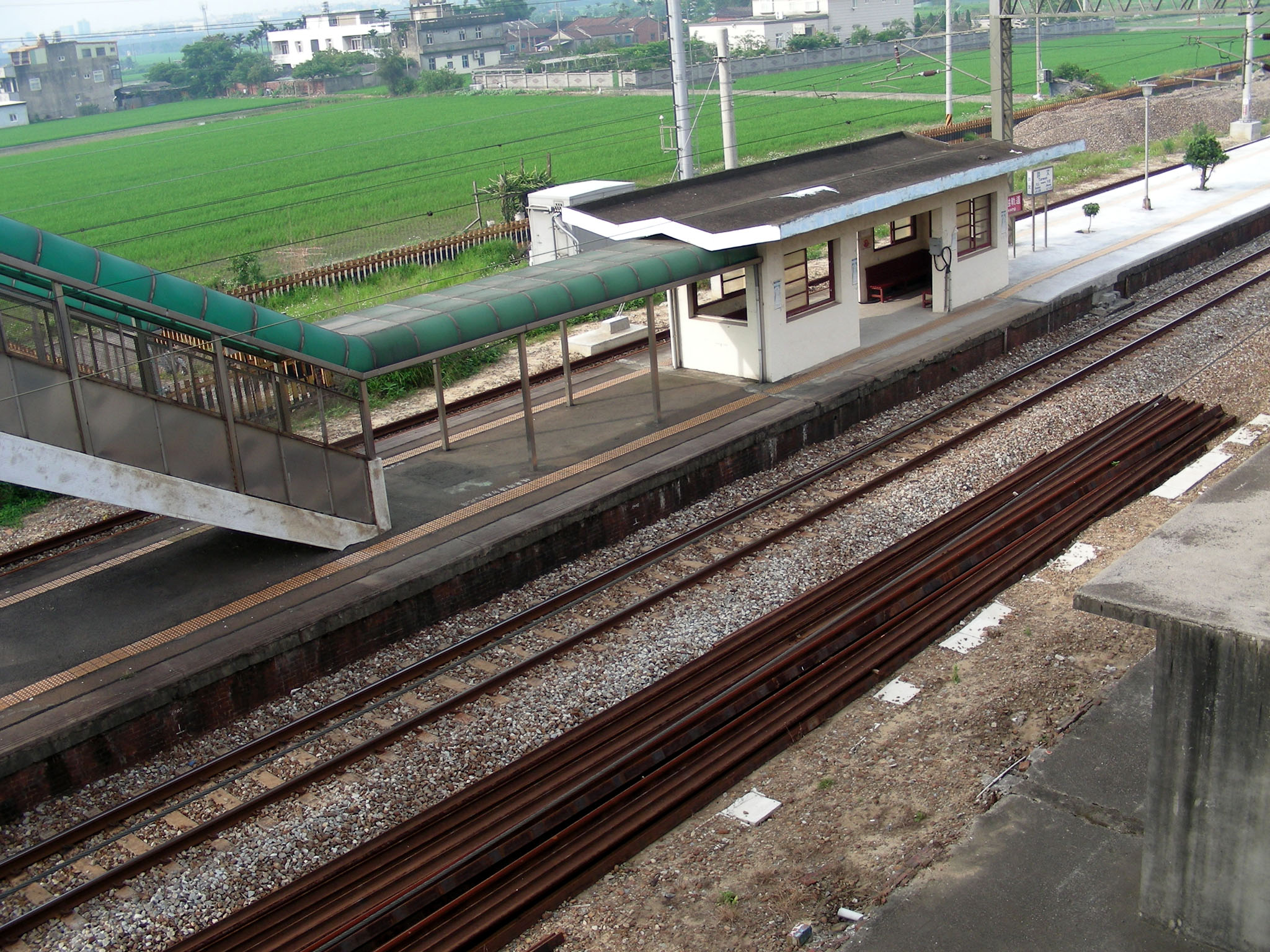
Tanwen station platform

== Around the station ==
- Yu Da University

== See also ==
- List of railway stations in Taiwan
