= Miaoli County =

County of Taiwan

Miaoli County 苗栗縣
- County
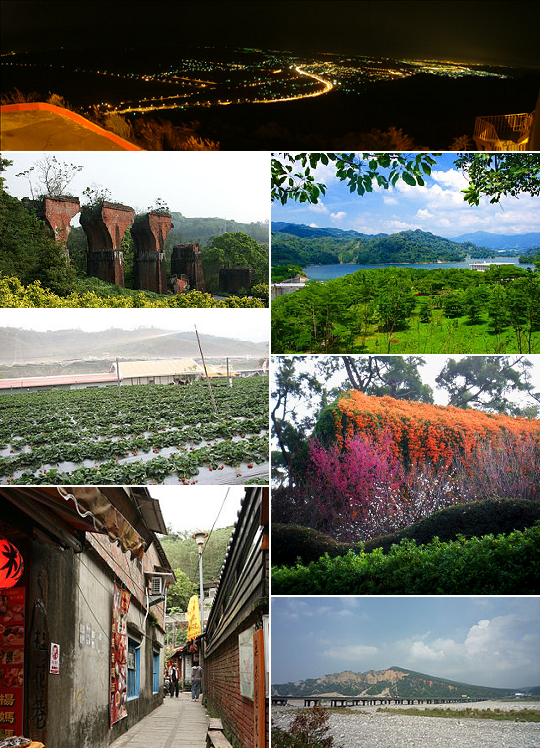
- Top: A night view of Tongluo, Second left: Longteng Bridge, Second right: Liyu Reserve Lake, Third left: Chunhsiang Strawberry Farm Park, Third right: Hakka Cultural Park, Bottom left: Osmamthus Street in Nanchuang, Bottom right: Mount Huoyen

- Flag Logo

- Coordinates: 24°33′48.29″N 120°49′32.98″E
- Country: Republic of China (Taiwan)
- Province: Taiwan^{a}
- Region: Western Taiwan
- Seat: Miaoli City
- Largest city: Toufen
- Boroughs: 2 cities, 16 (5 urban, 11 rural) townships

Government
  - County magistrate: Chung Tung-chin (Independent)

Area
  - Total: 1,820.3149 km^{2} (702.8275 sq mi)
  - Rank: 11 of 22

Population (September 2023)
  - Total: 535,011
  - Rank: 11 of 22
  - Density: 293.911/km^{2} (761.227/sq mi)
- Time zone: UTC+8 (National Standard Time)
- ISO 3166 code: TW-MIA
- Website: www.miaoli.gov.tw/default.aspx
- Symbols
- Bird: European magpie (Pica pica)
- Flower: Camphor laurel (Cinnamomum camphora)
- Tree: Tea olive (Osmanthus fragrans)
- ^{a} In Taiwan, provinces remain a nominal division according to the Taiwanese constitution, but are no longer considered to have any administrative function practically.

Miaoli County
- Traditional Chinese: 苗栗縣
- Simplified Chinese: 苗栗县
Transcriptions
Standard Mandarin
- Hanyu Pinyin: miáo lì xiàn
- Bopomofo: ㄇㄧㄠˊ ㄌㄧˋ ㄒㄧㄢˋ
- Gwoyeu Romatzyh: Miaulih Shiann
- Wade–Giles: Miao^{2}-li^{4} Hsien^{4}
- Tongyong Pinyin: Miáolì Siàn
- Yale Romanization: Myáulì Syàn
- MPS2: Miáulì Shiàn
- IPA: [mjǎʊ.lî ɕjɛ̂n]
Hakka
- Pha̍k-fa-sṳ: Mèu-li̍t-yen
Southern Min
- Hokkien POJ: Biâu-le̍k-koān or Miâu-le̍k-koān
- Tâi-lô: Biâu-li̍k-kuān or Miâu-li̍k-kuān

Miaoli (Note: In local languages: Traditional Chinese script: 苗栗縣; Mandarin Pinyin: miáo lì xiàn; Hokkien: Biâu-le̍k-koān or Miâu-le̍k-koān; Sixian Hakka: Mèu-li̍t-yen) is a county in western Taiwan, bordered by Hsinchu County and Hsinchu City to the north, Taichung to the south, and the Taiwan Strait to the west. Miaoli is classified as central Taiwan by the National Development Council and northern Taiwan by the Taiwan Central Weather Bureau. The county's demographic profile consists of Han Chinese alongside Taiwanese Indigenous peoples, with aborigines making up roughly 1.9% of the total population. The Han population is geographically split; Hoklo communities are the main group in western urban areas, whereas Hakka communities form the majority in the rural central and southern parts of the county.

The early history of the region began with indigenous aborigines who were later impacted by European presence under Dutch colonial rule. Han Chinese rule expanded after the Kingdom of Tungning took over the island from the Dutch and initiated structural immigration plans. Following the transition to Qing dynasty governance, Miaoli was established as an independent county in 1889. During the era of Japanese imperial rule, the county underwent multiple administrative modifications and eventually fell under the jurisdiction of Shinchiku Prefecture. Following the Republic of China (ROC) takeover in 1945, the territory was initially absorbed back into Hsinchu County. However, a major governance change in August 1950 led to its detachment from Hsinchu County to re-establish Miaoli County as its own entity within Taiwan Province. This administrative framework governed local operations until the overarching provincial structure was downsized and frozen in 1998.

Today, Miaoli County is internationally known for its rolling hills, tranquil natural landscapes, and well-preserved Hakka culture. Miaoli City is the capital of the county, and is also known as Mountain Town, owing to the number of mountains nearby, making it a destination for hiking. The county has also built a unique identity around its local industries, becoming highly celebrated for traditional Sanyi wood-carvings and agricultural specialities like Dahu strawberries, Tongluo chrysanthemums, and Gongguan red dates.

== Name ==
The name Miaoli was coined by matching the Hakka Chinese sound for the characters 貓貍 to the phonetically approximate Pali (Bari) from the Taokas language. The resulting word (貓狸) is a widespread but non-orthodox variant referring to Viverridae. In 1889, during late Qing rule, the name was modified from various forms (貓裏, 貓裡, 貓里) to its current form.

== History ==
Evidence of settlement in Miaoli dates back a thousand years. Many archaeological artifacts have been found showing that during the prehistoric era, people lived in the river terrace. They mainly led an agriculture life and engaged in hunting and fishing for extra food. About a thousand years ago, an indigenous group of Taokas people settled here.

In the mid-17th century, Han Chinese began to migrate into the area, beginning a gradual process of deforestation and establishment of permanent settlement sites. Most inhabitants of Miaoli assimilated into the dominant Han population or migrated deeper into the mountainous areas. After several hundred years, Miaoli had become the home of people from different origins, such as the Hakka, Hoklo, Atayal and Saisiat peoples.

=== Kingdom of Tungning ===
After Koxinga took over Taiwan from the Netherlands, he placed Miaoli in Tian-sing County (天興縣) and started an immigration plan to develop the area.

=== Qing Dynasty ===
After the last Tungning ruler Zheng Keshuang surrendered to the Qing Dynasty, Tian-sing County was renamed Zhuluo County. In 1889, Miaoli Hsien (苗栗縣) was established as an independent county under Taiwan Prefecture. At the end of the 19th century, thousands of acres of high-quality fertile fields had been reclaimed in the area of Nanzhuang, Shitan, Dahu and Zhuolan. Public and private schools were also established all over Miaoli which made the area a place of gathering intellectuals and elites in northern Taiwan.

=== Empire of Japan ===
The county was at first eliminated under Japanese Imperial rule. Byōritsu-chō (Japanese: 苗栗庁) existed from c. 1901 to 1908, but was split over Shinchiku-chō (新竹庁) and Taichū-chō (台中庁) in 1909. From 1920 to 1945, Byōritsu town (苗栗街), Enri town (苑裡街) and six villages were under the jurisdiction of Byōritsu District, under Shinchiku Prefecture.

=== Republic of China ===
After the handover of Taiwan from Japan to the Republic of China on 25 October 1945, the present day area of Miaoli County was incorporated to Hsinchu County. On 16 August 1950, the government re-established Miaoli County with Miaoli Township as the county seat. On 25 December 1981, Miaoli Township was upgraded from a township to a county-administered city.

== Geography ==
Miaoli County is considered to be located in the central northern part of the island of Taiwan, contiguous with Hsinchu county, Hsinchu City, and Taichung City. The Xueshan Range is located on the border between Miaoli county and Taichung City. Miaoli county north to south averages about 50 kilometers and east to west averages about 64 kilometers. It is roughly diamond-shaped in appearance. The overall coastline of Miaoli is about 50 kilometers long.

Miaoli has little flat lands (plateau) and very mountainous due to the Xueshan Range. Miaoli has rich rainfall along with abundant rivers.

== Administrative divisions ==
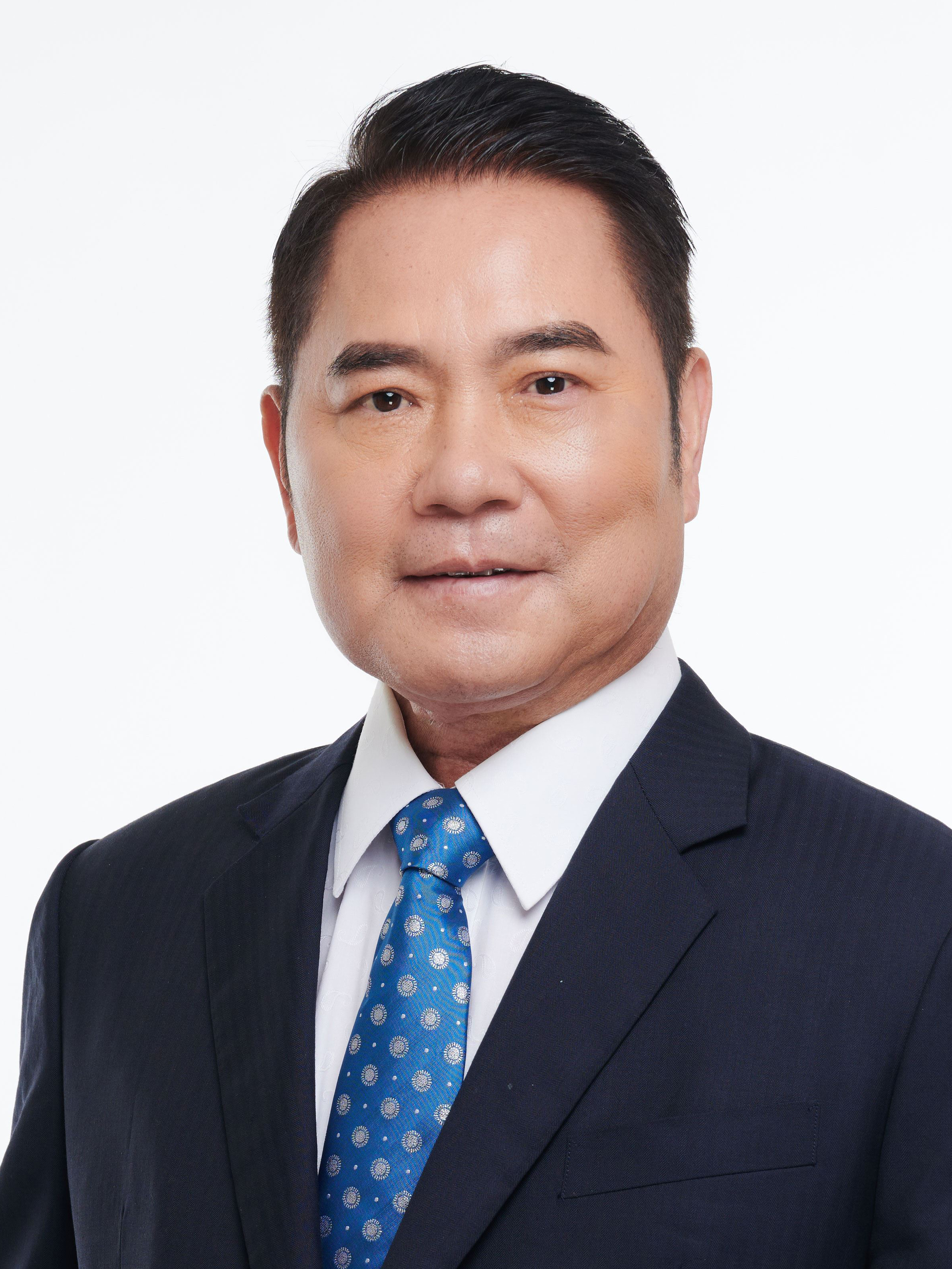
Chung Tung-chin, Magistrate of Miaoli County

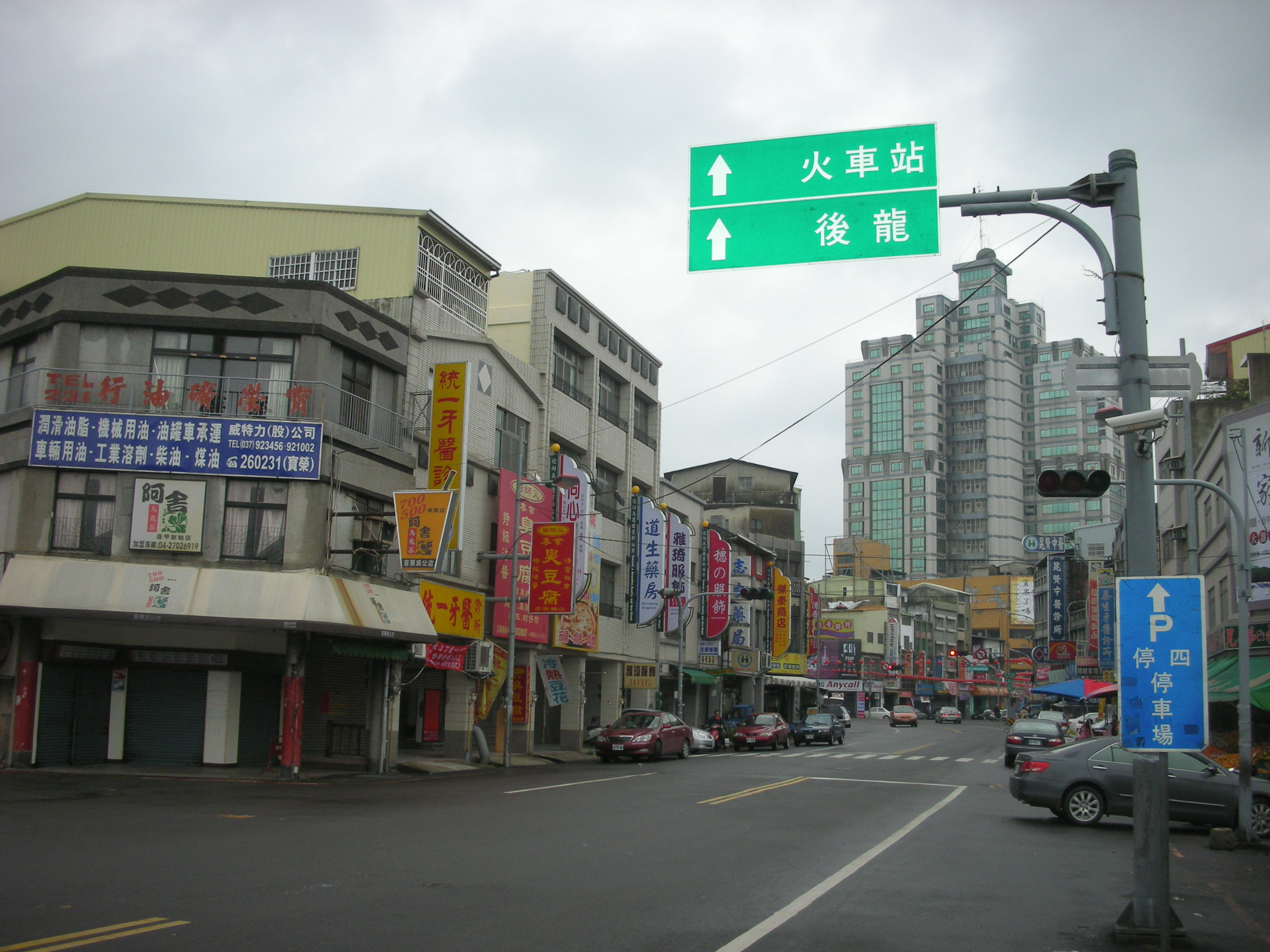
Miaoli City, the county seat of Miaoli County

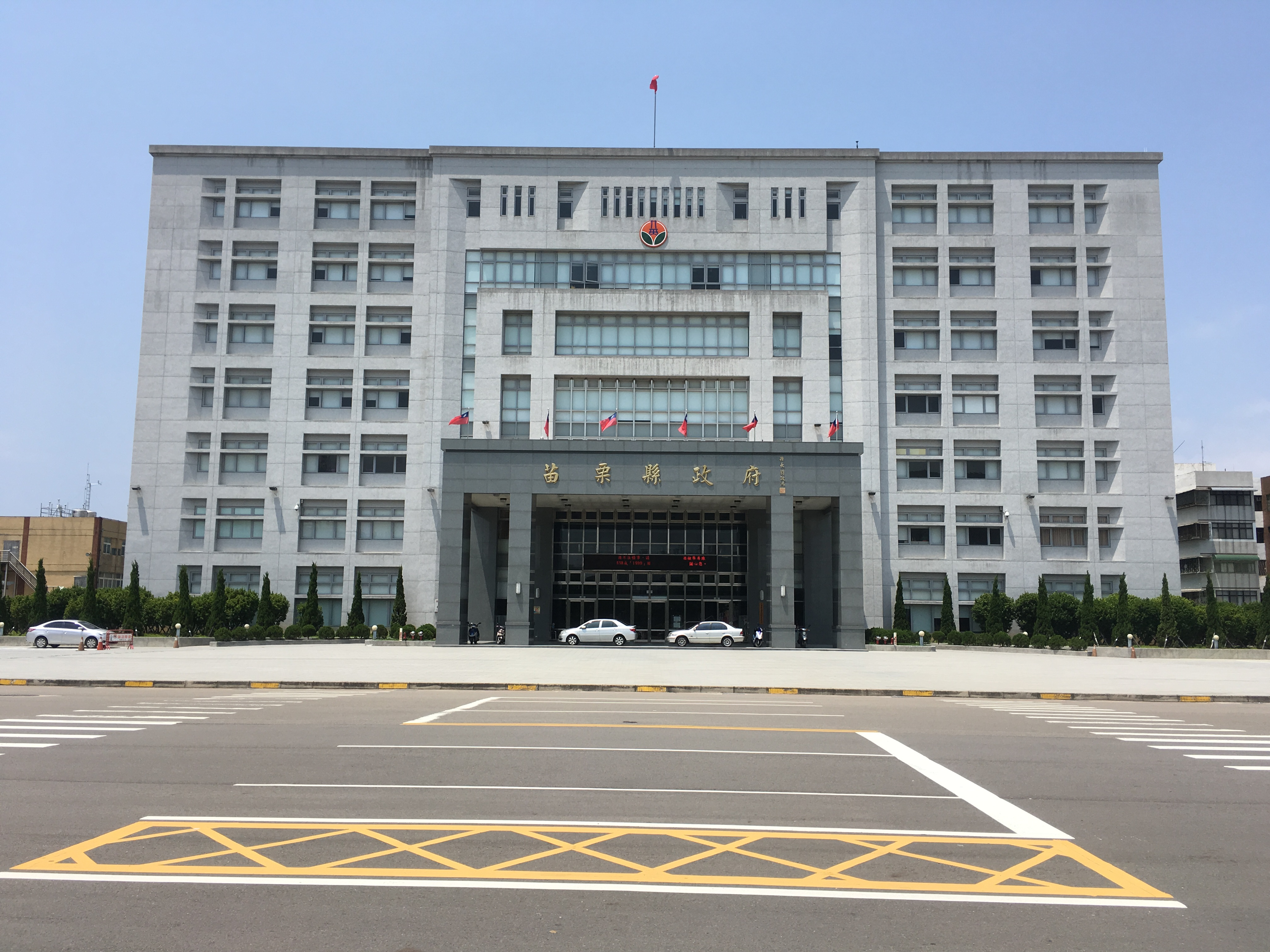
Miaoli County Government

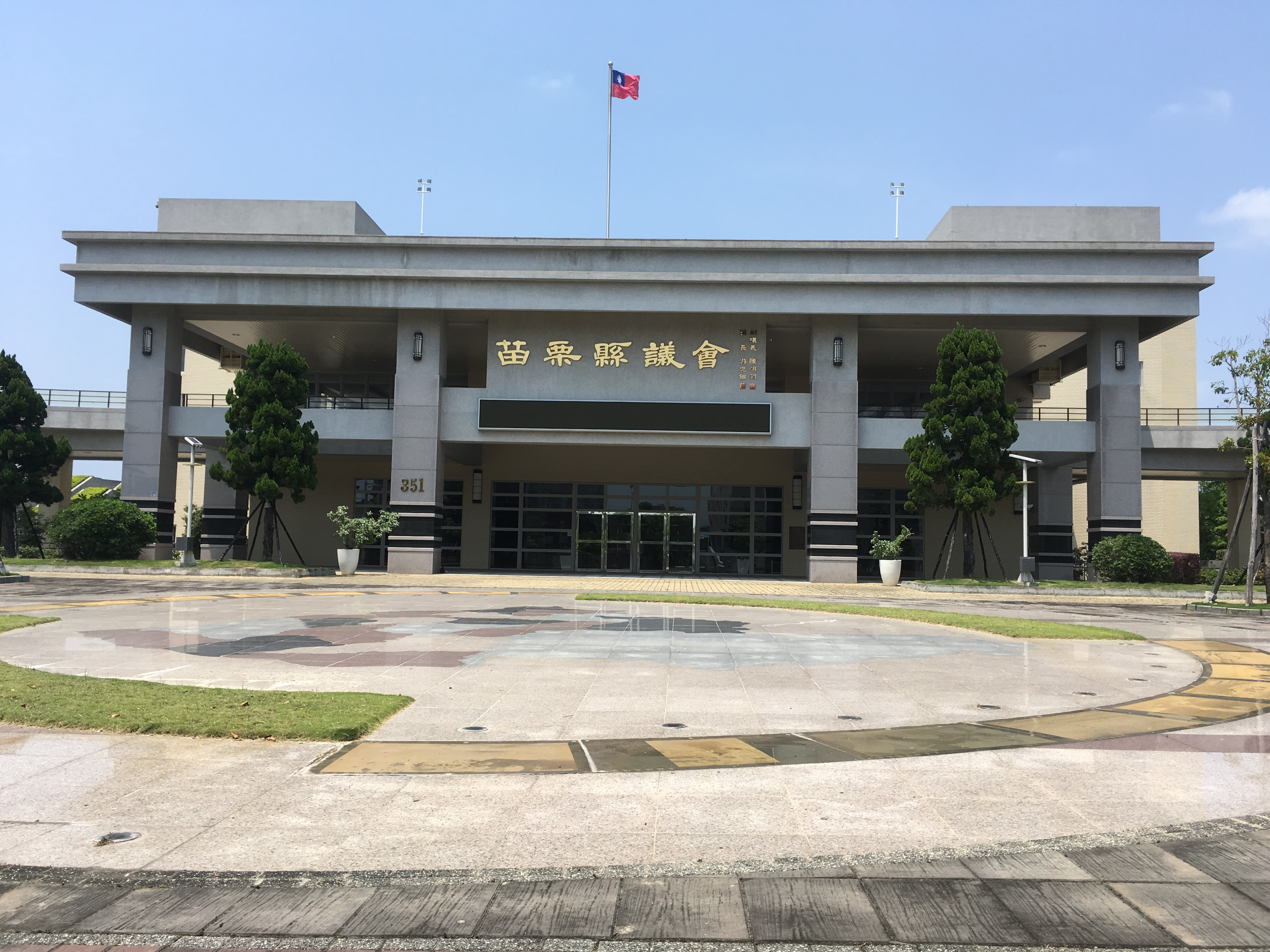
Miaoli County Council

Miaoli County is divided into 2 cities, 5 urban townships, 10 rural townships and 1 mountain indigenous townships. Miaoli County has the second highest number of urban townships after Changhua County. Miaoli City is the county seat which houses the Miaoli County Government and Miaoli County Council. The incumbent Magistrate of Miaoli County is independent Chung Tung-chin.

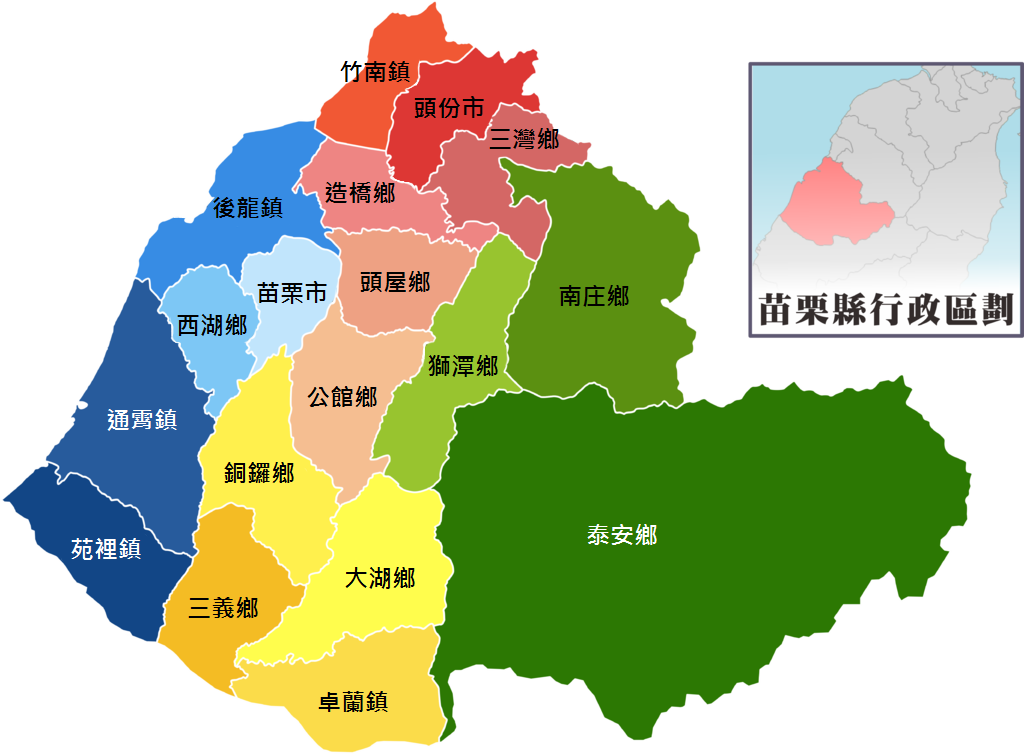

Type	Name	Chinese	Taiwanese	Hakka	Area (km^{2})	Number of villages	Number of neighborhoods	Population	Density (per km^{2})
City	Miaoli City	苗栗市	Biâu-le̍k or Miâu-le̍k	Mèu-li̍t	37.8872	28	716	86,327	2,401
City	Toufen City	頭份市	Thâu-hūn	Thèu-fun	53.32	32	570	106,310	1,925
Urban townships	Houlong	後龍鎮	Āu-lâng	Heu-liùng	75.8072	23	368	34,120	506
Urban townships	Tongxiao (Tongsiao)	通霄鎮	Thong-siau	Thûng-sêu	107.768	24	394	31,377	343
Urban townships	Yuanli	苑裡鎮	Oán-lí	Yen-lî	68.2472	25	362	43,812	712
Urban townships	Zhunan (Chunan; Jhunan)	竹南鎮	Tek-lâm	Tsuk-nàm	37.5592	25	518	89,420	2,226
Urban townships	Zhuolan (Jhuolan)	卓蘭鎮	Tah-lân	Cho̍k-làn	75.316	11	176	15,290	240
Rural townships	Dahu	大湖鄉	Tōa-ô͘	Thai-fù	90.8392	12	179	13,035	171
Rural townships	Gongguan (Kungkuan)	公館鄉	Kong-koán	Kûng-kón	71.452	19	281	31,327	488
Rural townships	Nanzhuang (Nanchuang; Nanjhuang)	南庄鄉	Lâm-chng	Nàm-chông	165.4936	9	184	8,903	65
Rural townships	Sanwan	三灣鄉	Sam-oan	Sâm-vân	52.296	8	93	5,992	136
Rural townships	Sanyi	三義鄉	Sam-gī	Sâm-ngi	69.3424	7	161	14,995	249
Rural townships	Shitan (Shihtan)	獅潭鄉	Sai-thâm	Sṳ̂-thàn	79.432	7	98	4,110	59
Rural townships	Tongluo	銅鑼鄉	Tâng-lô	Thùng-lò	78.38	10	218	16,563	241
Rural townships	Touwu	頭屋鄉	Thâu-ok	Thèu-vuk	52.504	8	120	9,835	217
Rural townships	Xihu (Sihu)	西湖鄉	Se-ô͘	Sî-fù	41.0752	9	108	6,284	185
Rural townships	Zaoqiao (Zaociao)	造橋鄉	Chō-kiô	Cho-khièu	47.9976	9	115	11,639	280
Mountain indigenous townships	Tai'an (Tai-an; Taian)	泰安鄉	Thài-an	Thai-ôn	614.5936	8	64	5,672	10
County total					1,820.3149	274	4,725	535,011	312

Colors indicate the common language status of Hakka within each division. Note that Nanzhuang and Tai'an are also indigenous areas of the Atayal people.

== Demographics and culture ==
Historical population
Year	Pop.	±%
1946	312,830	—
1950	336,523	+7.6%
1955	386,693	+14.9%
1960	435,084	+12.5%
1965	479,685	+10.3%
1970	524,744	+9.4%
1975	538,820	+2.7%
1980	542,551	+0.7%
1985	550,343	+1.4%
1990	547,609	−0.5%
1995	560,128	+2.3%
2000	559,703	−0.1%
2005	559,944	+0.0%
2010	560,968	+0.2%
2015	563,912	+0.5%
2020	542,590	−3.8%
2025	531,172	−2.1%
Source: 1. "臺灣省現住人口籍別 (1950)". 臺灣省戶籍統計要覽 (Report). Vol. 中華民國35-47年(48. 6). 臺灣省政府. June 1959. p. 73.; 2. "苗栗縣現住人口概況 (1951-1958)". 苗栗縣統計年報 (Report). Vol. 中華民國47年(48. 9). September 1959. p. 15-16.; 3. 楊政男, ed. (August 2006). "第三節 光復以後人口". 重修苗栗縣志. Vol. 卷七 人口志. 苗栗縣政府. pp. 10–18.; 4. "Populations by city and country in Taiwan". Ministry of the Interior Population Census.

View source data.

=== Population ===
The main population of Miaoli County comprises the Han Chinese and the Taiwanese Indigenous peoples. The Taiwanese Indigenous peoples constitute about 1.9% of the total population where the rural areas is where the Hokkiens are the main group in western urban areas of Miaoli, while the Hakkas comprise the main group of Han Chinese in the rural southern and central parts of Miaoli county

Taiwanese Indigenous peoples

The Saisiat currently reside in Wufeng Township of Hsinchu County and Nanzhuang Township of Miaoli County. Due to oppression by initial Han immigrants, the Atayal people and the Nanzhuang Incident, the population of the Saisiat people has decreased to 5,000 people. It is the least populous Taiwanese Indigenous group after the Thao people. The traditions and culture of the Saisiat is greatly impacted by the Atayal and Hakka people in the region.

Han Chinese

During the Qing Dynasty, Miaoli was inhabited by Hokkiens in the coast and Hakka in the rural peasant mountainous areas. Currently, the inhabitants of the four coastal townships of Miaoli (Zhunan Township, Houlong Township, Tongxiao Township, and Yuanli Township) consists of primarily Taiwanese Hokkien speakers. With the exception of the four coastal townships and Tai'an Township, the main population consists of Hakka.

=== Sports ===
The main sports and recreational structures in Miaoli include Miaoli Sports Hall, Miaoli County Tennis Court, and the Park of Zhunan Township. In Taiwan's National Athletic Games of 2011, Miaoli ranked 21 out of 22 teams with 1 gold, 1 silver, and 8 bronze medals.

== Economy ==
Popular regional agriculture, food production and culture promoted by the government include strawberries from Dahu Township, Hakka zongzi, Sanwan Chinese pears, Touwu daikons, Sanyi wood sculptures, and Tai'an persimmons.

In 2019, annual revenue of Miaoli County is NT$19.1 billion, while its annual expenditure is NT$18.9 billion. Monthly, Miaoli County Government spends NT$600 million on their staff salaries and another NT$600 million for retirement obligations. As of July 2015, the county government has a debt of NT$64.8 billion.

On revenue, the county government received NT$9,572,442,000 from tax revenue (49.92% of all of its total revenue), NT$8,845,859,000 from subsidy and financial assistance (46.13% of all of its total revenue) and NT$283,792,000 from fines and compensation (1.49% of all of its total revenue). On expenditure, the county government spent NT$7,239,103,000 on education, science and culture (38.21% of all of its total expenditure), NT$4,457,682,000 for general and administration (23.53% of all of its total expenditure) and NT$2,267,660,000 on social welfare (11.97% of all of its total expenditure).

== Education ==
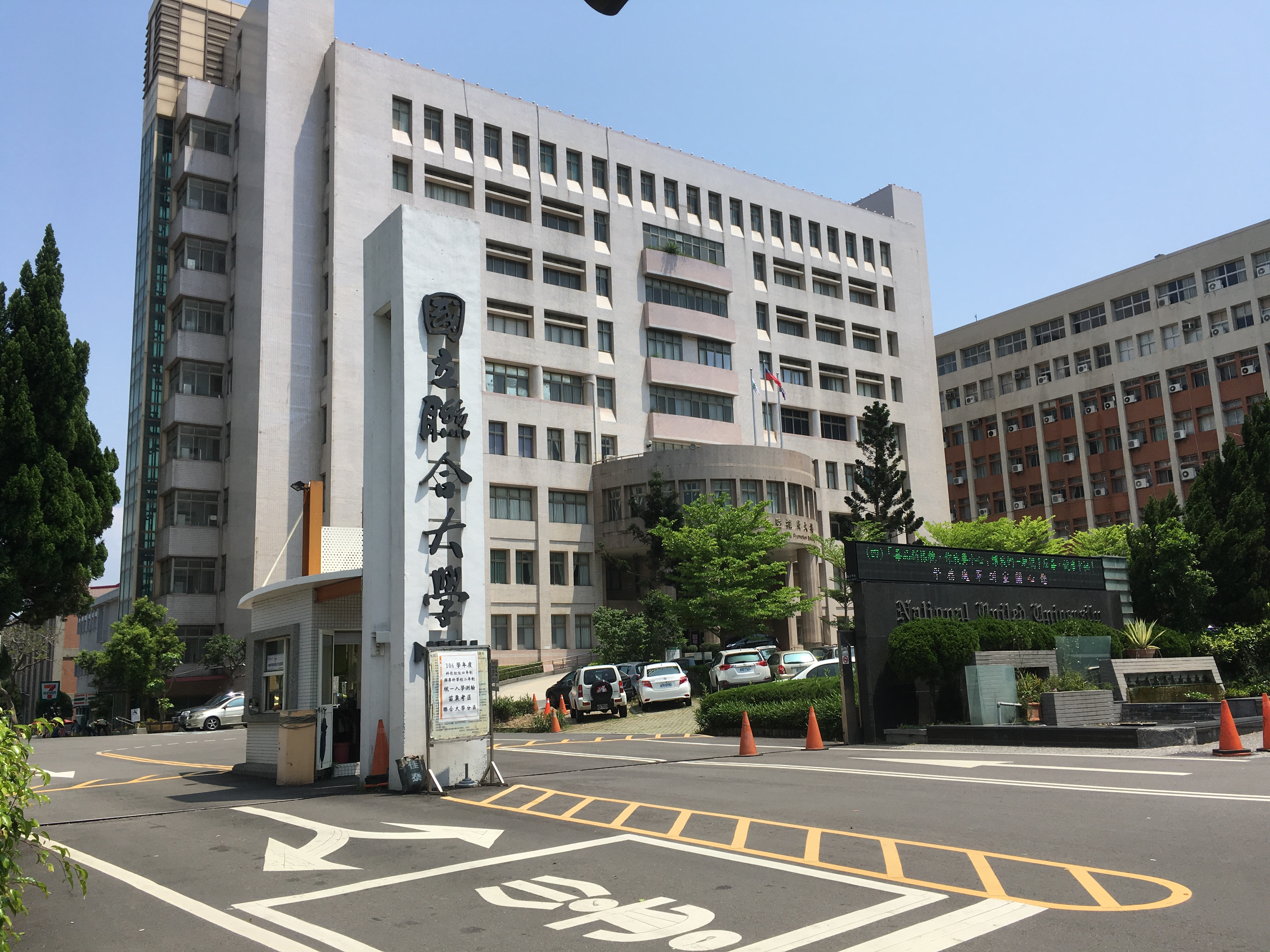
National United University

Education-related affairs in Miaoli County is regulated by Education Department of the Miaoli County Government. At the end of 2004, the population of people older than 15 years old was 451,128, among which 97.91% of them were literate. There were 108,052 college-educated, 156,870 senior high school or junior college graduates, 176,755 junior high school or lower graduates. The percentage of people receiving education higher than college was relatively low.

Miaoli County houses several universities and colleges, such as the National United University, Yu Da University and Jen-Teh Junior College of Medicine, Nursing and Management.

== Energy ==
=== Power generation ===
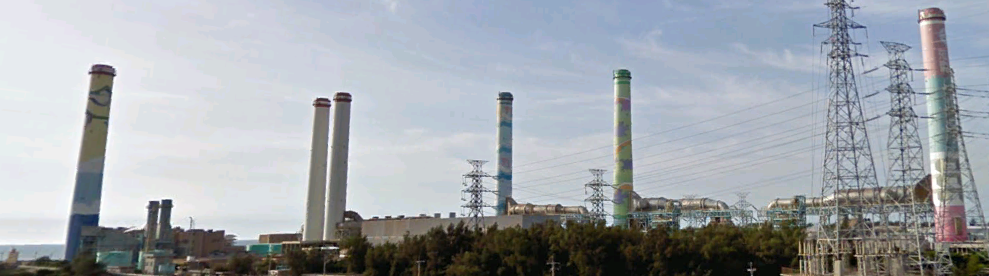
Tunghsiao Power Plant

Miaoli County houses the gas-fired Tunghsiao Power Plant in Tongxiao Township, the second largest gas-fired power plant in Taiwan with a capacity of 1,815 MW. The county also houses Taiwan's first offshore wind power plant named Formosa 1 Offshore Wind Farm.

=== Water supply ===
The Mingde Dam in Touwu Township supplies water for irrigation and water supply for the county. The dam has a capacity of 17.1 million cubic meters.

== Tourism ==
Tourist arrivals to Miaoli in 2011 was 17,000,000 people.

=== Tourist attractions ===
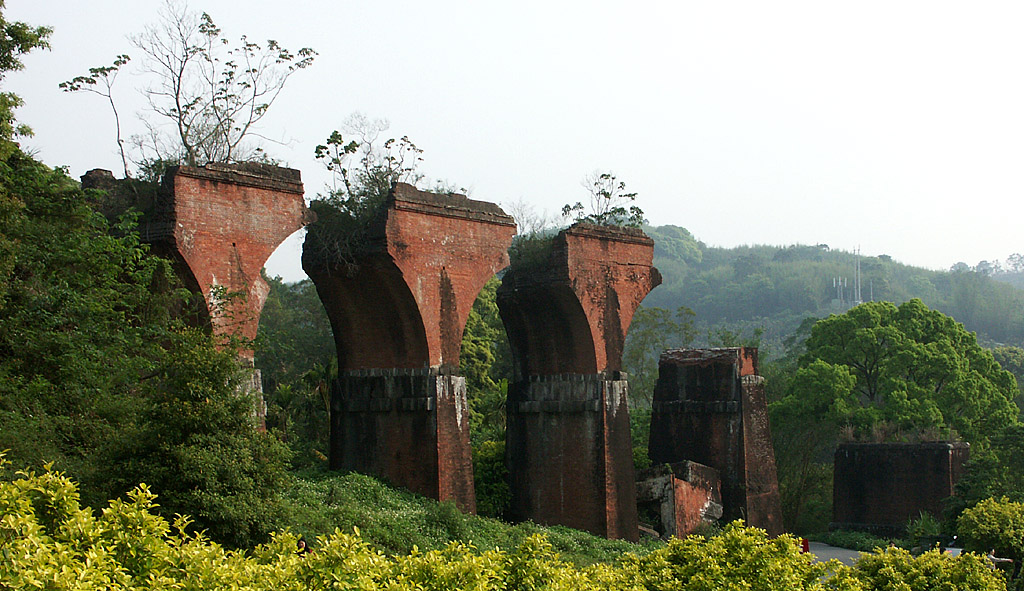
Longteng Bridge in Sanyi Township

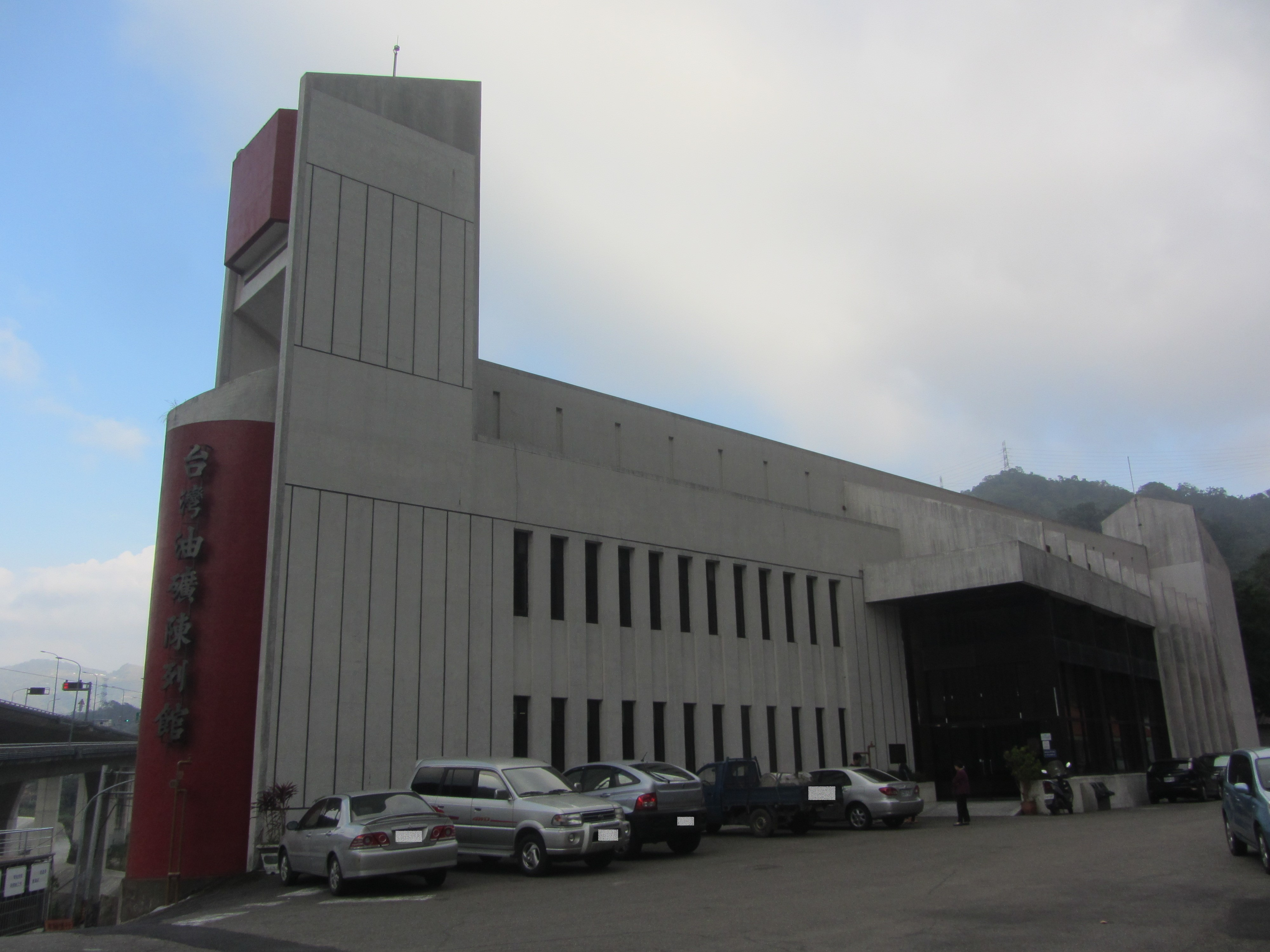
Taiwan Oil Field Exhibition Hall

==== Nature ====
Nature tourism in Miaoli County includes Flying Cow Ranch, Longfeng Fishing Port, Shei-Pa National Park, Waipu Fishing Port and Yongheshan Reservoir.

==== Museums and galleries ====
The county houses several museums, such as Huoyan Mountain Ecology Museum, Miaoli Ceramics Museum, Miaoli County Urban Planning Exhibition Center, Miaoli Railway Museum, Museum of Saisiat Folklore, Sanyi Wood Sculpture Museum, Taiwan Oil Field Exhibition Hall, Triangle Rush Exhibition Hall and Zaochiao Charcoal Museum.

==== Cultural centers ====
Cultural centers in the county include the Miaoli Park, Wu Chuo-liu Art and Cultural Hall, Wugu Cultural Village, Yingtsai Academy and Hakka Round House.

==== Entertainment centers ====
Entertainment centers in the county are Nanzhuang Theater and West Lake Resortopia.

==== Temples ====
Temples in the county are Zhonggang Cihyu Temple, Gongtian Temple, Shuntian Temple, Yuqing Temple, Miaoli Wenchang Temple, Xuanwang Temple and Maling Temple.

==== Festivals ====
The various cultural festivals of Miaoli County include, Miaoli Marine Tourism, Meng-Hua Literary Award, Hakka Tung Hua Festival, Hakka folk song festival, and Miaoli international tourism festival.

== Transportation ==
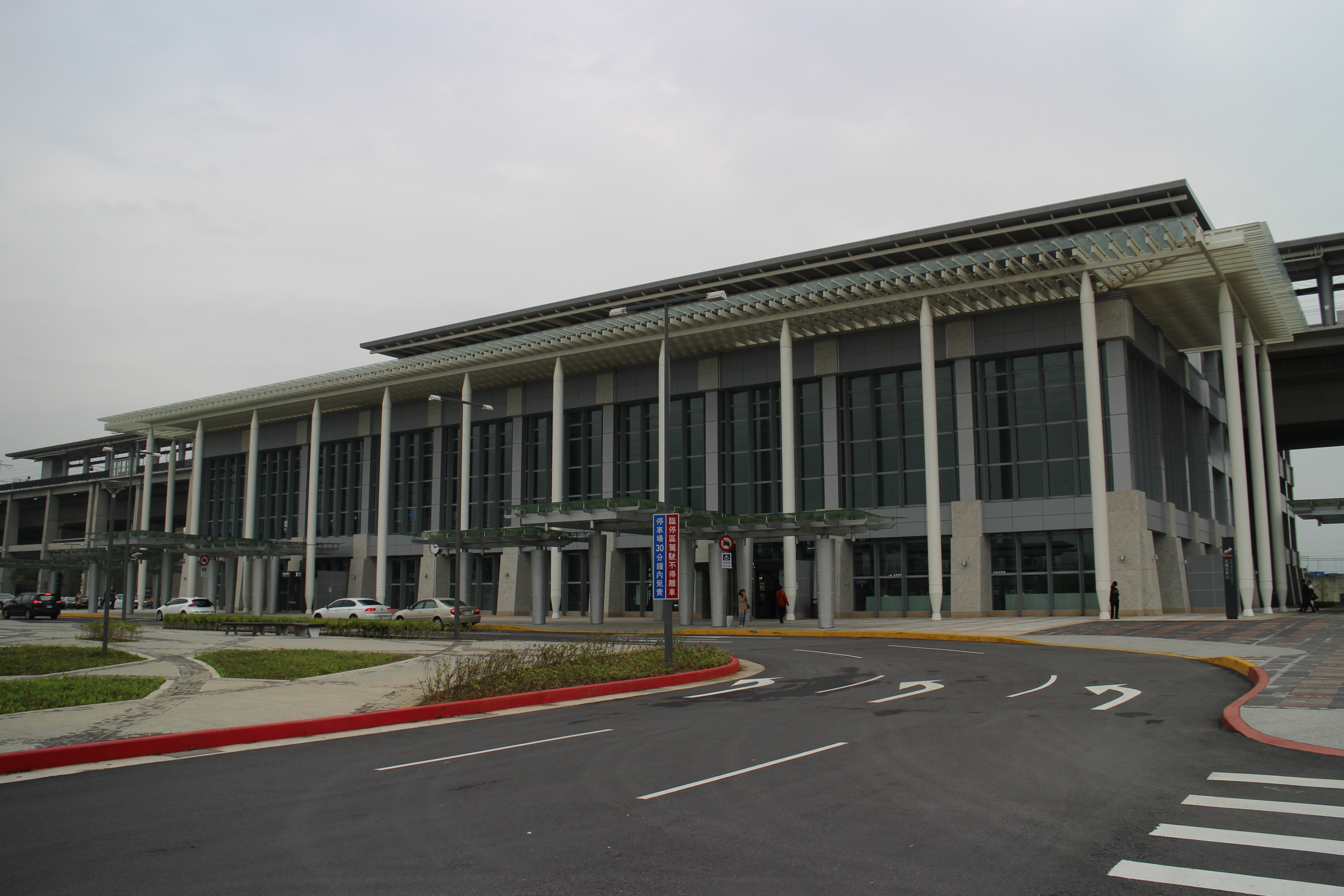
HSR Miaoli Station

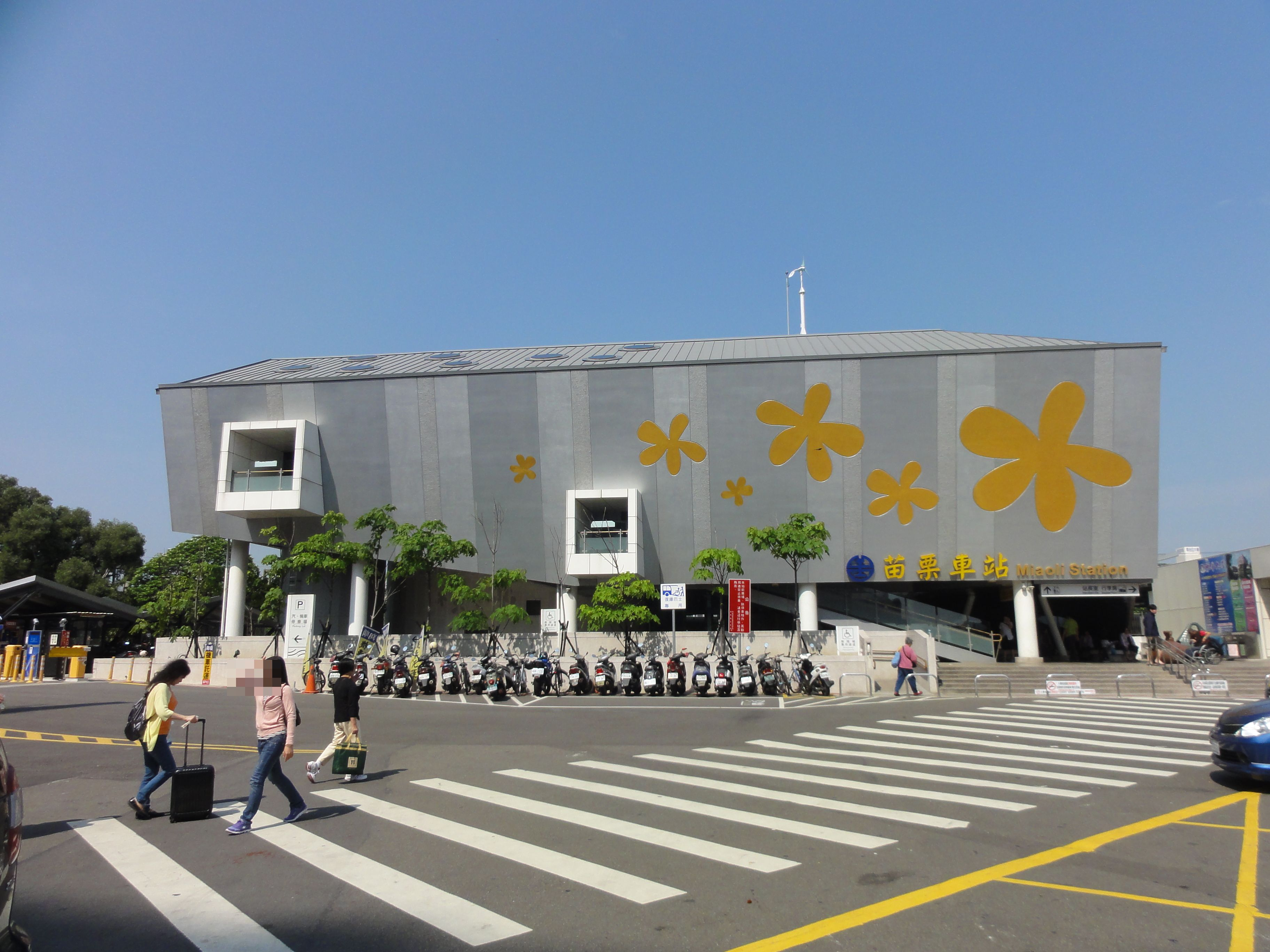
TRA Miaoli Station

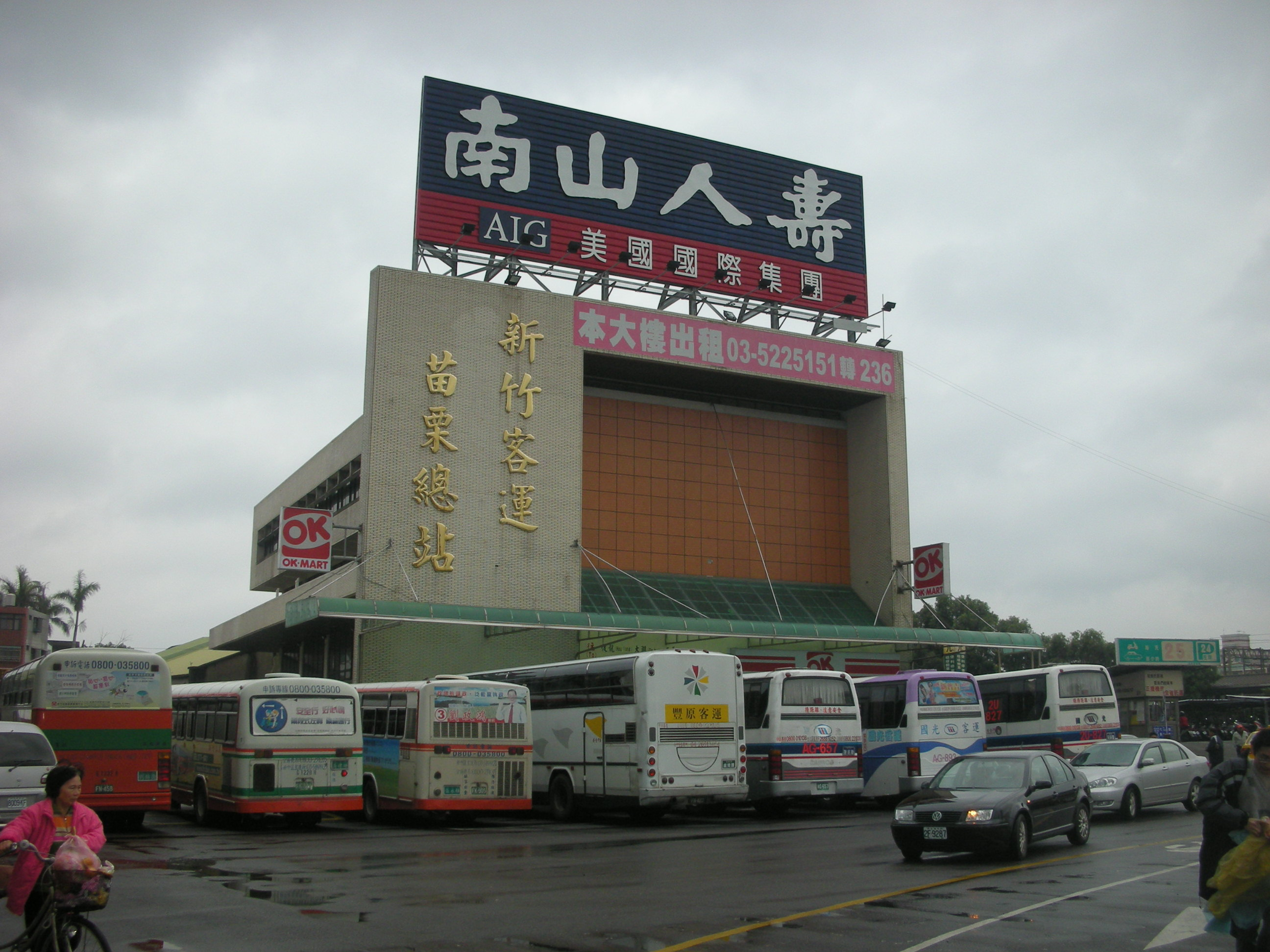
Miaoli Bus Station

=== Rail ===
Miaoli Station of the Taiwan High Speed Rail is located in Houlong Township. The county is also served by the Western Trunk Line and Taichung Line of Taiwan Railway. Stations on the Western Trunk Line include:

- Qiding
- Zhunan
- Tanwen
- Dashan
- Houlong
- Longgang
- Baishatun
- Xinpu
- Tongxiao
- Yuanli

Stations on the Taichung Line include the Zhunan, Zaoqiao, Fengfu, Miaoli, Nanshi, Tongluo, and Sanyi Stations.

=== Road ===
Both National Freeway 1 and National Freeway 3 pass through Miaoli County.

== Notable people ==
This is a list of notable people from Miaoli.

- Kao Yi-feng, novelist

== See also ==
- Nangang River
