= Zhunan railway station =

Railway station in Miaoli, Taiwan

Zhunan 竹南
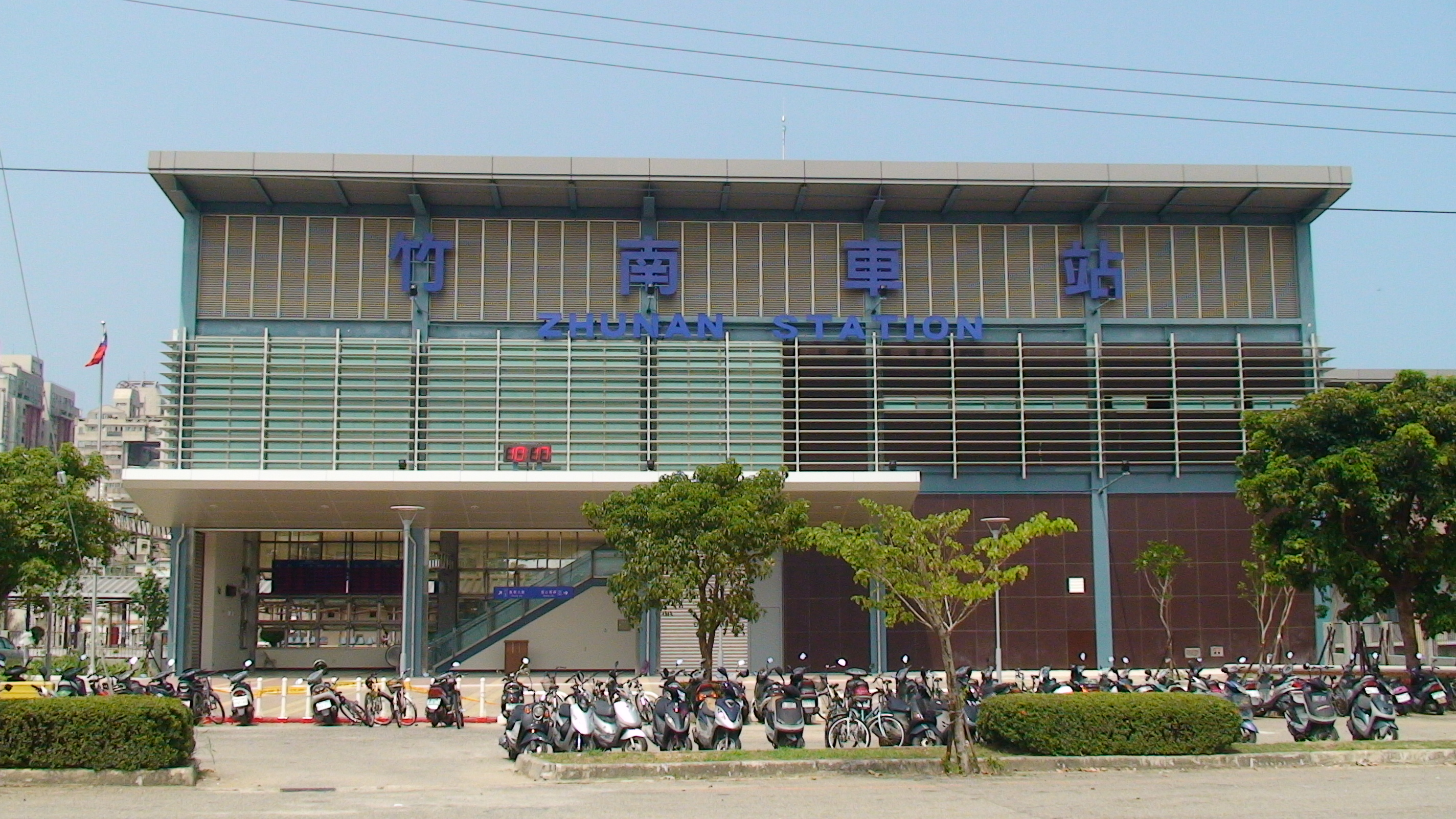

Chinese name
- Traditional Chinese: 竹南
Transcriptions
Standard Mandarin
- Hanyu Pinyin: Zhúnán
- Bopomofo: ㄓㄨˊ ㄋㄢˊ

General information
- Location: 166 Zhongshan Rd, Zhunan, Miaoli County, Taiwan
- Coordinates: 24.6865°N 120.8807°E
- System: Taiwan Railway railway station
- Lines: Western Trunk line; Western Trunk line (coastal)
- Distance: 125.4 km to Keelung
- Connections: Local bus; Coach

Construction
- Structure type: Ground level

Other information
- Station code: A32 (statistical)
- Classification: First class (Chinese: 一等)
- Website: www.railway.gov.tw/jhunan/ (in Chinese)

History
- Opened: 10 August 1902
- Rebuilt: 15 August 2009
- Electrified: 24 February 1978

Passengers
- 2017: 5.840 million per year ▲1.78%
- Rank: 23 out of 228

Services
Preceding station	Taiwan Railway	Following station
Qiding towards Keelung	Western Trunk line	Zaoqiao towards Kaohsiung
Terminus	Western Trunk line (coastal)	Tanwen towards Changhua
Location
- Location within Taiwan

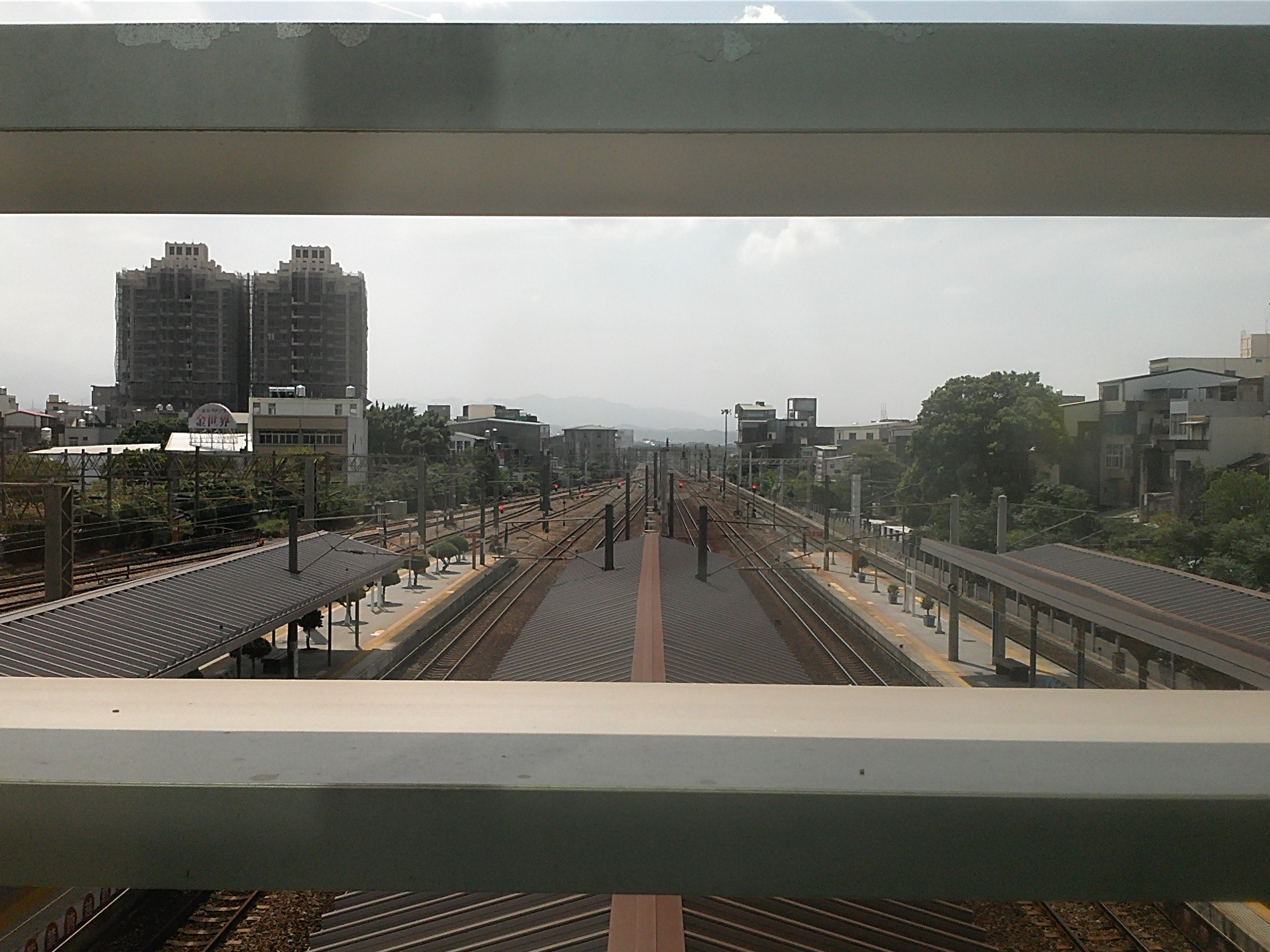
Zhunan Station platform

Zhunan (Chinese: 竹南; pinyin: Zhúnán) is a railway station in Miaoli County, Taiwan served by Taiwan Railway. It lies at the northern junction of the Mountain and Coast lines of the West Coast line.

== Overview ==
The station has three island platforms. Although it is a first-class station, the Taroko Express, a variant of the Tzu-Chiang Limited Express which passes through the Taichung line (Mountain line), does not stop at this station.

== History ==
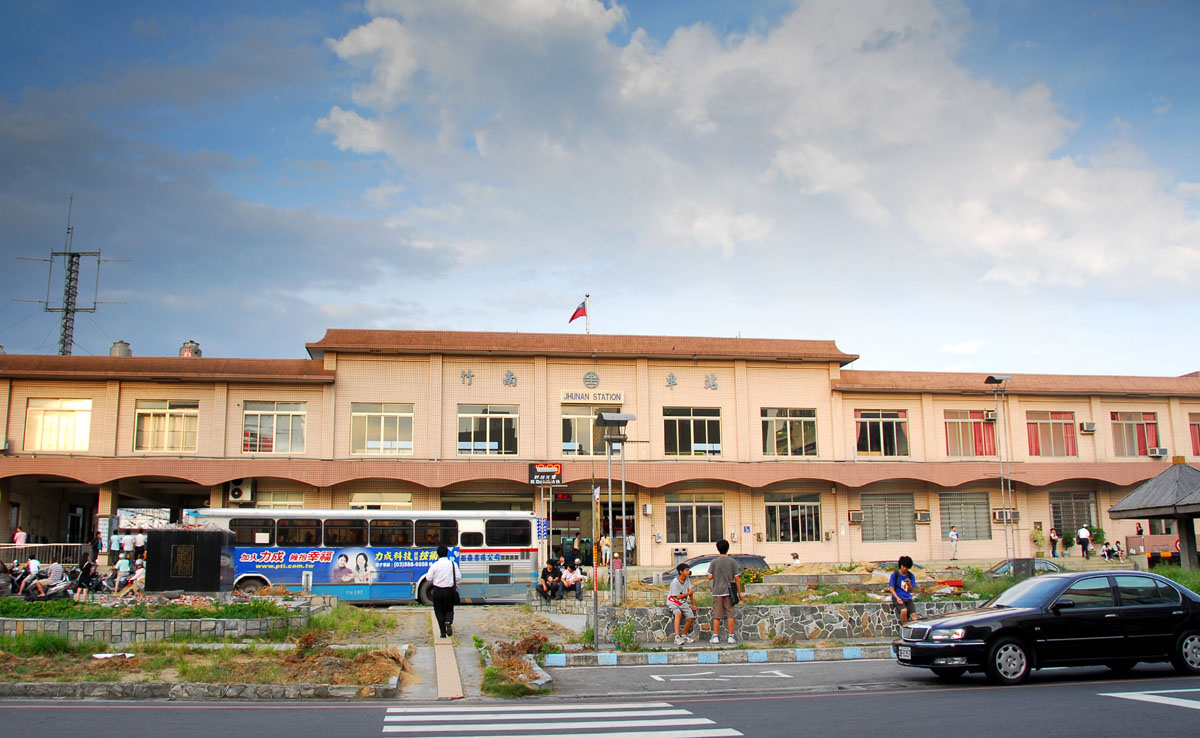
Former Zhunan station building

- 1902-08-10: The station first opens for service as Chūkō-eki (Japanese: 中港驛). It was a wooden station building.
- 1903-05-25: The section to Byōritsu opens for service.
- 1920-10-01: The station name is changed to "Chikunan Station".
- Due to its location on the Coastal line, the station is upgraded to a first-class station.
- 1931-03-01: The section between Taipei and Chikunan becomes double-tracked.
- 1935-11-06: Due to the earthquake on 1935-04-24, the station is reconstructed as a concrete building.
- 1943-04: The new southern station building is constructed.
- 1949-09: The new northern station building is constructed.
- 1995-05-22: As part of the double-tracking construction for the Mountain line, the station structure is demolished.
- 1997-01-01: The new station opens for service.
- 2001: The southern station building is demolished and relocated to Jiji.
- 2007-11: The northern part of the new station is completed.
- 2009-01: The southern part of the new station is completed.
- 2009-08-15: The entire station is completed and begins service.
- 2011-02-26: Due to the celebration of the Taiwan Lantern Festival, the station sets a single-day record of 160,000 passengers.

== Station layout ==
Platform 1A	← (Tanwen) Coastal line Southbound (originating) toward Shalu, Dajia
Island platform
Platform 1B	Passing track toward Taipei, Taitung (Qiding)→
Platform 2A	← (Zaoqiao) Mountain line toward Miaoli, Kaohsiung
Island platform
Platform 2B	← (Tanwen) Coastal line toward Houlong, Pingtung
Platform 3A	Northbound track toward Keelung, Hsinchu (Qiding)→
Island platform
Platform 3B	←(Zaoqiao) Mountain line southbound toward Taichung, Changhua

== Around the station ==
- Asia-Pacific Institute of Creativity
- Zhonggang Cihyu Temple

== See also ==
- West Coast line (Taiwan)
- Taichung line
