= Zaoqiao =

Rural township in Miaoli County, Taiwan

Coordinates: 24°39′N 120°52′E

Zaoqiao Township 造橋鄉 Zaociao
- Rural township
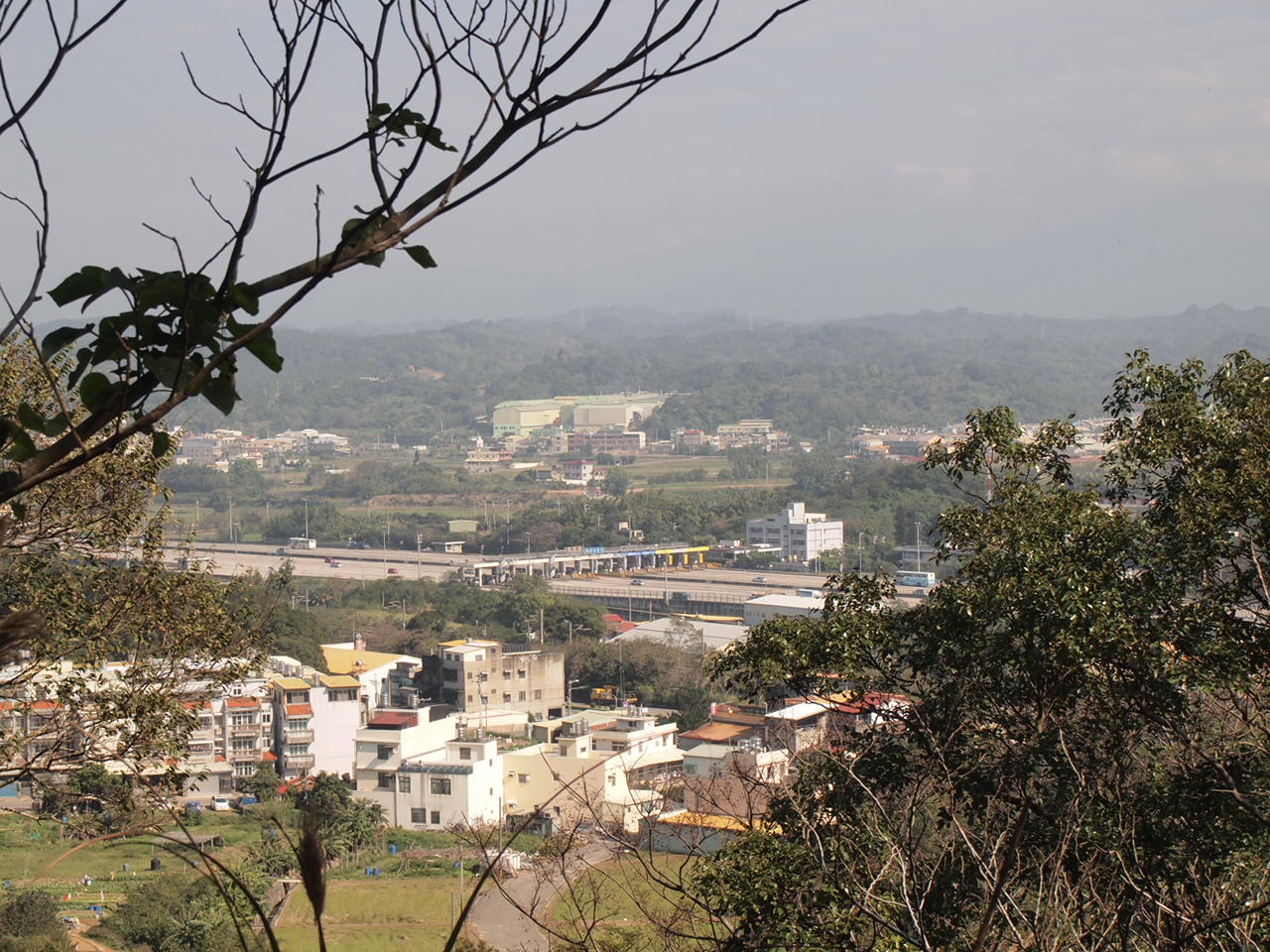

- Zaociao Township Office, Miaoli County

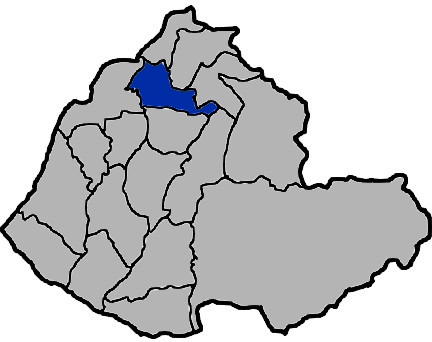
- Zaoqiao Township in Miaoli County
- Location: Miaoli County, Taiwan

Area
  - Total: 48 km^{2} (19 sq mi)

Population (September 2023)
  - Total: 11,639
  - Density: 240/km^{2} (630/sq mi)
- Website: www.tch.gov.tw (in Chinese)

Zaoqiao Township
- Chinese: 造橋鄉
- Hanyu Pinyin: Zàoqiáo Xiāng
- Wade–Giles: Tsao^{4}-ch'iao^{2} Hsiang^{1}
- Tongyong Pinyin: Zàociáo Siang
- Pha̍k-fa-sṳ: Cho-khièu-hiông
- Hokkien POJ: Chō-kiô-hiong

Zaoqiao Township / Zaociao Township is a rural township in northern Miaoli County, Taiwan.

== Geography ==
- Area: 48.00 square kilometres (18.53 sq mi)
- Population: 11,639 (September 2023)

== Administrative divisions ==
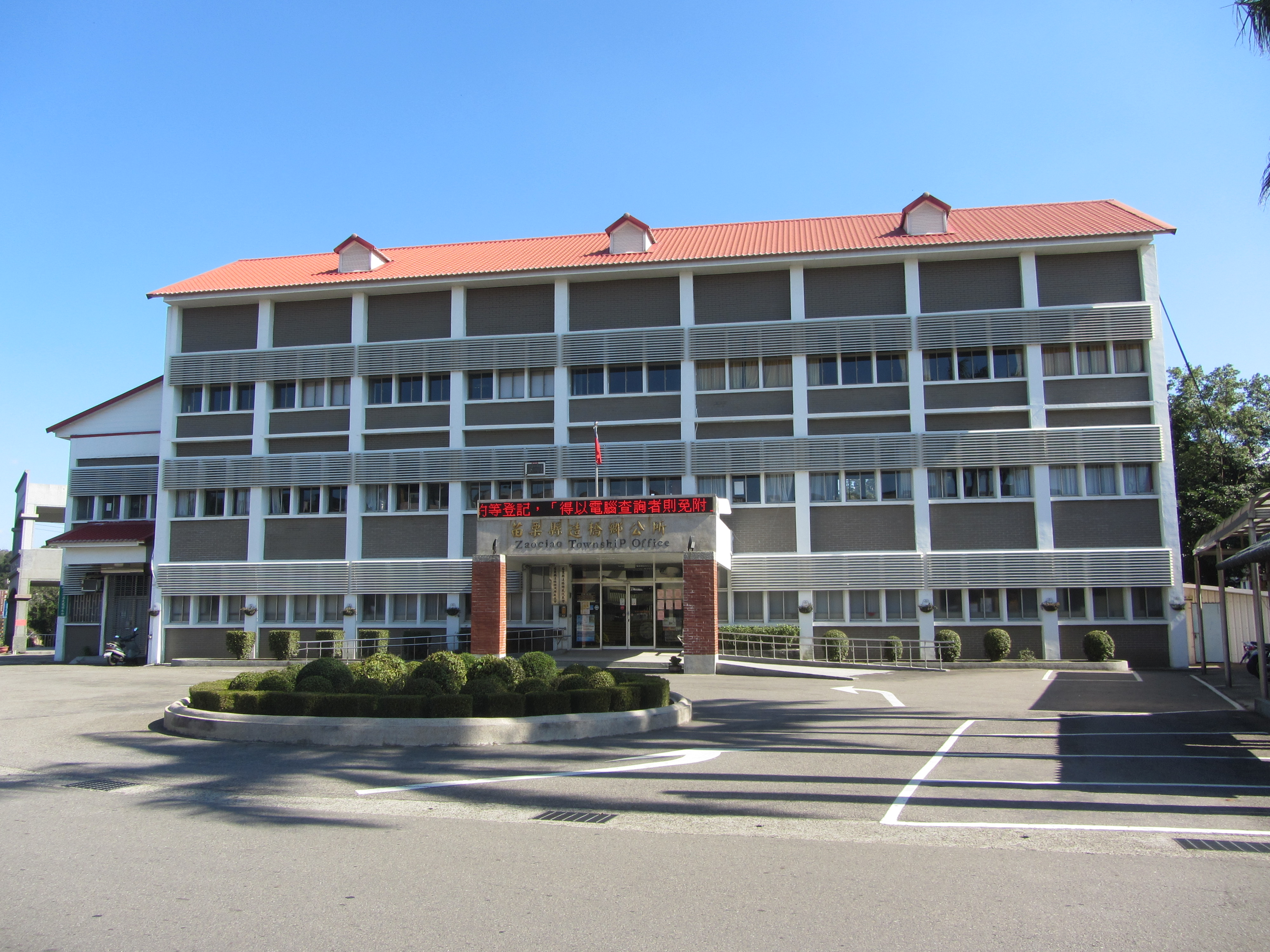
Zaociao Township Office

The township comprises nine villages: Dalong, Daxi, Fenghu, Jinshui, Longsheng, Pingxing, Tanwen, Zaoqiao and Zhaoyang.

== Politics ==
The township is part of Miaoli County Constituency I electoral district for Legislative Yuan.

== Education ==
- Yu Da University of Science and Technology

== Tourist attractions ==
- Shan Gri-La Paradise
- Zaochiao Charcoal Museum

== Transportation ==
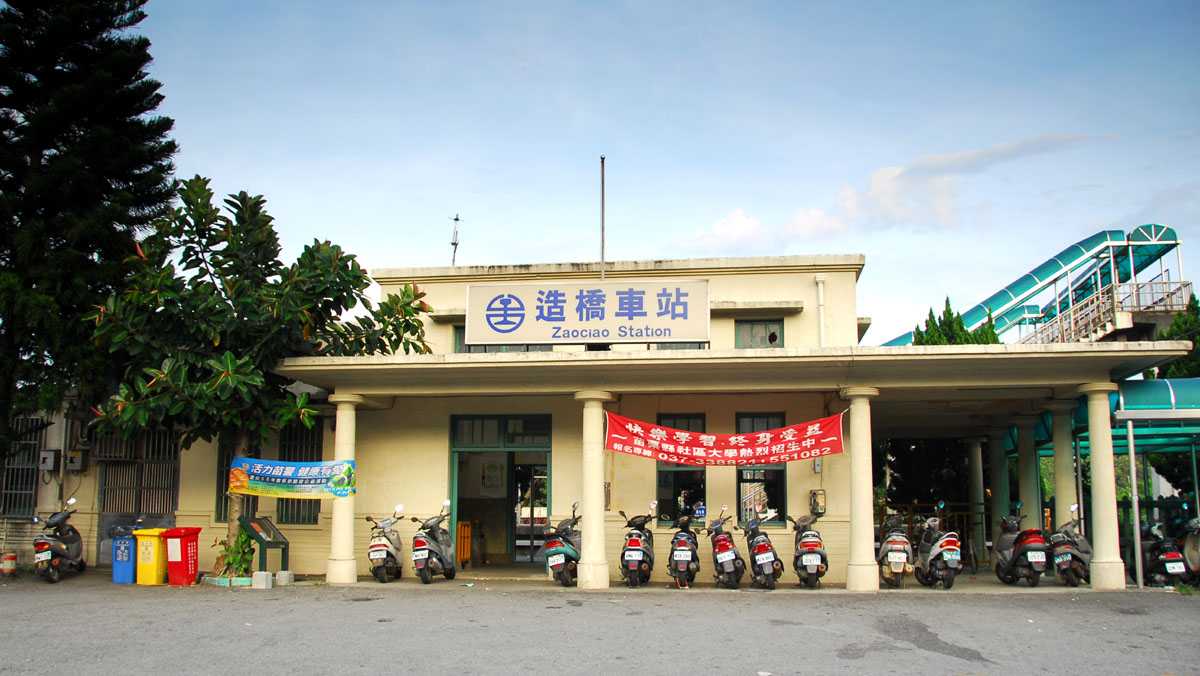
Zaoqiao Station

The township is accessible from Tanwen Station and Zaoqiao Station of Taiwan Railway. Taiwan High Speed Rail also passes through the central part of the township, but no station is located here. The closest HSR services are from Miaoli HSR station in Houlong Township.

== Notable people ==
- He Delai (1904-1986), painter
