= Zhunan =

Urban township in Miaoli County, Taiwan

Coordinates: 24°41′N 120°53′E

Zhunan Township 竹南鎮 Jhunan
- Urban township
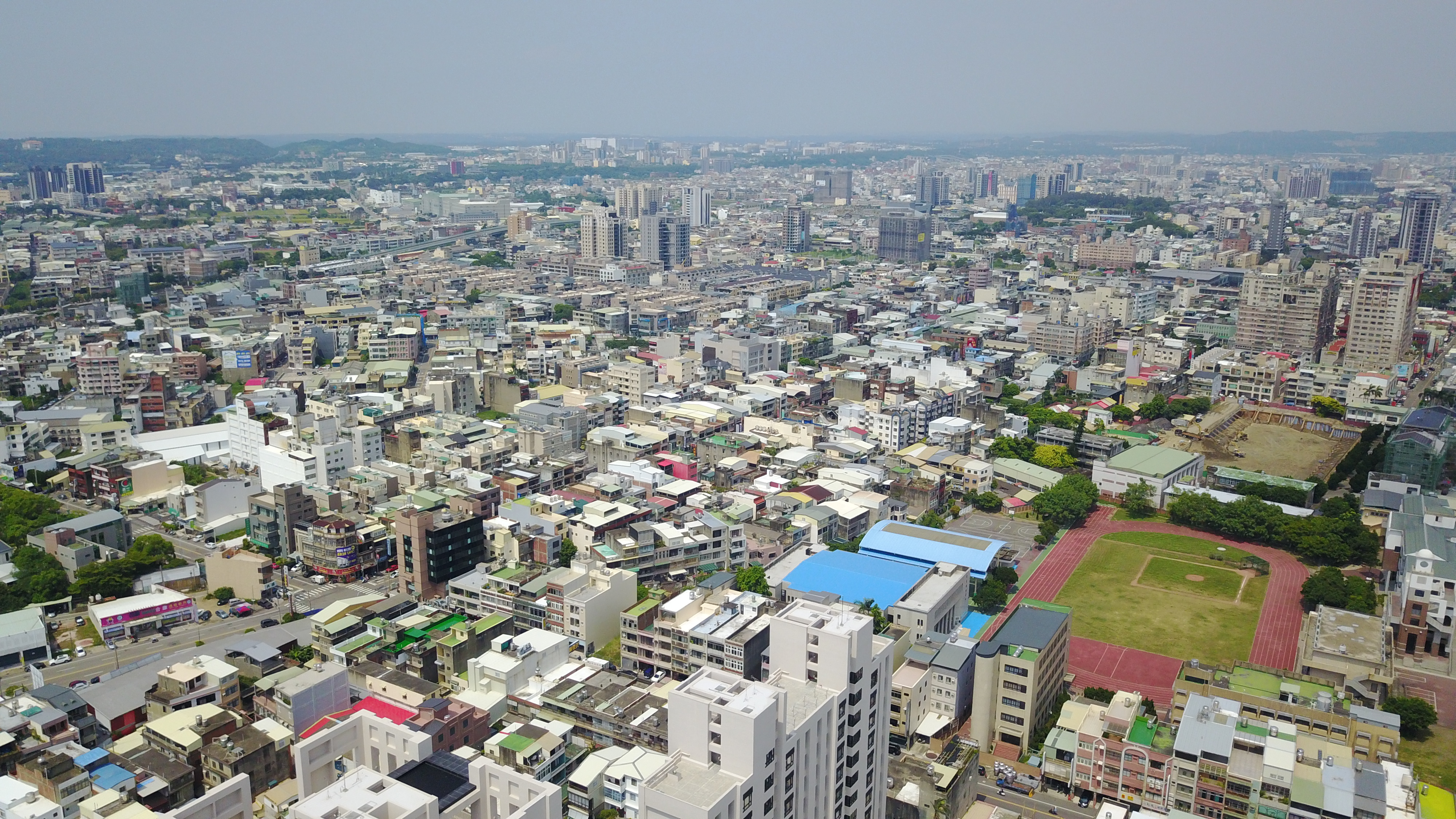

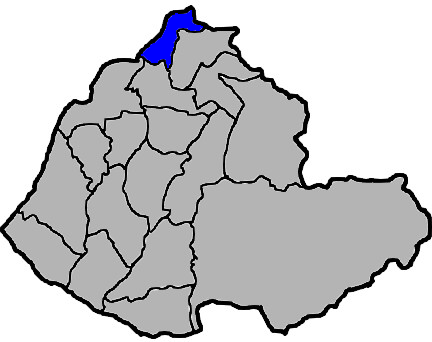
- Zhunan Township in Miaoli County
- Location: Miaoli County, Taiwan

Area
  - Total: 37.56 km^{2} (14.50 sq mi)

Population (September 2023)
  - Total: 89,420
- Website: www.chunan.gov.tw (in Chinese)

Zhunan Township
- Chinese: 竹南鎮
- Hanyu Pinyin: Zhúnán Zhèn
- Wade–Giles: Chu^{2}-nan^{2} Chen^{4}
- Tongyong Pinyin: Jhúnán Jhèn
- Pha̍k-fa-sṳ: Tsuk-nàm-chṳ́n
- Hokkien POJ: Tek-lâm-tìn

Zhunan Township is an urban township in northern Miaoli County, Taiwan. Its city centre forms a continuous urban area with Toufen.

== Name ==
Literally, Zhúnán (竹南) means "bamboo south" but in this context, zhú is short for "Hsinchu". Thus, Zhunan lies south of Hsinchu (cf. Zhubei which lies north [běi] of Hsinchu). A previous name of the area was Tiong-káng (中港), literally "central port", a name preserved in Zhonggang (中港), one of the 25 constituent villages of Zhunan. The present name was adopted under Japanese rule in 1920.

== Geography ==
- Area: 37.56 square kilometres (14.50 sq mi)
- Population: 89,420 (September 2023 estimate)

== Administrative divisions ==
The township comprises 25 villages: Dacuo, Dapu, Dingpu, Gangqi, Gongguan, Gongyi, Haikou, Jiaxing, Kaiyuan, Longfeng, Longshan, Qiding, Shanjia, Shengfu, Tianwen, Xinnan, Yingpan, Zhaonan, Zhengnan, Zhonggang, Zhonghua, Zhongmei, Zhongying, Zhunan and Zhuxing.

== Politics ==
The township is part of Miaoli County Constituency I electoral district for Legislative Yuan.

== Institutions ==
- National Health Research Institutes

== Sights and facilities ==
Zhunan was traditionally a beach and fishing community, and is closely associated with Goddess Mazu, who is the Goddess of Sea and Patron Deity of fishermen, sailors and any occupations related to sea/ocean. Zhunan's main tourist attraction is its prominent Mazu Temples like Zhonggang Cihyu Temple and Hotsu Longfong Temple which has a statue of the Goddess that is over 100 feet tall.

Zhunan is now part of Taiwan's computer sector and has a large Science Park.

Zhunan has wide open beaches and some cycling routes that run parallel to the beaches. Beach access was difficult until a bridge connecting the harbour and the beaches opened in 2008. It is a favourite spot among locals for surfing, kiteboarding, and windsurfing due to the year-round winds. Mountains overlook the town and are within a 20-minute drive.

- Longfeng Fishing Port
- Qiding Tunnels
- Zhonggang Cihyu Temple
- Hotsu Longfong Temple
- Northern Miaoli Art Center
- Ten Ren Tea Culture Museum
- Zhunan Brewery

== Infrastructures ==
- Miaoli County Refuse Incineration Plant

== Transportation ==
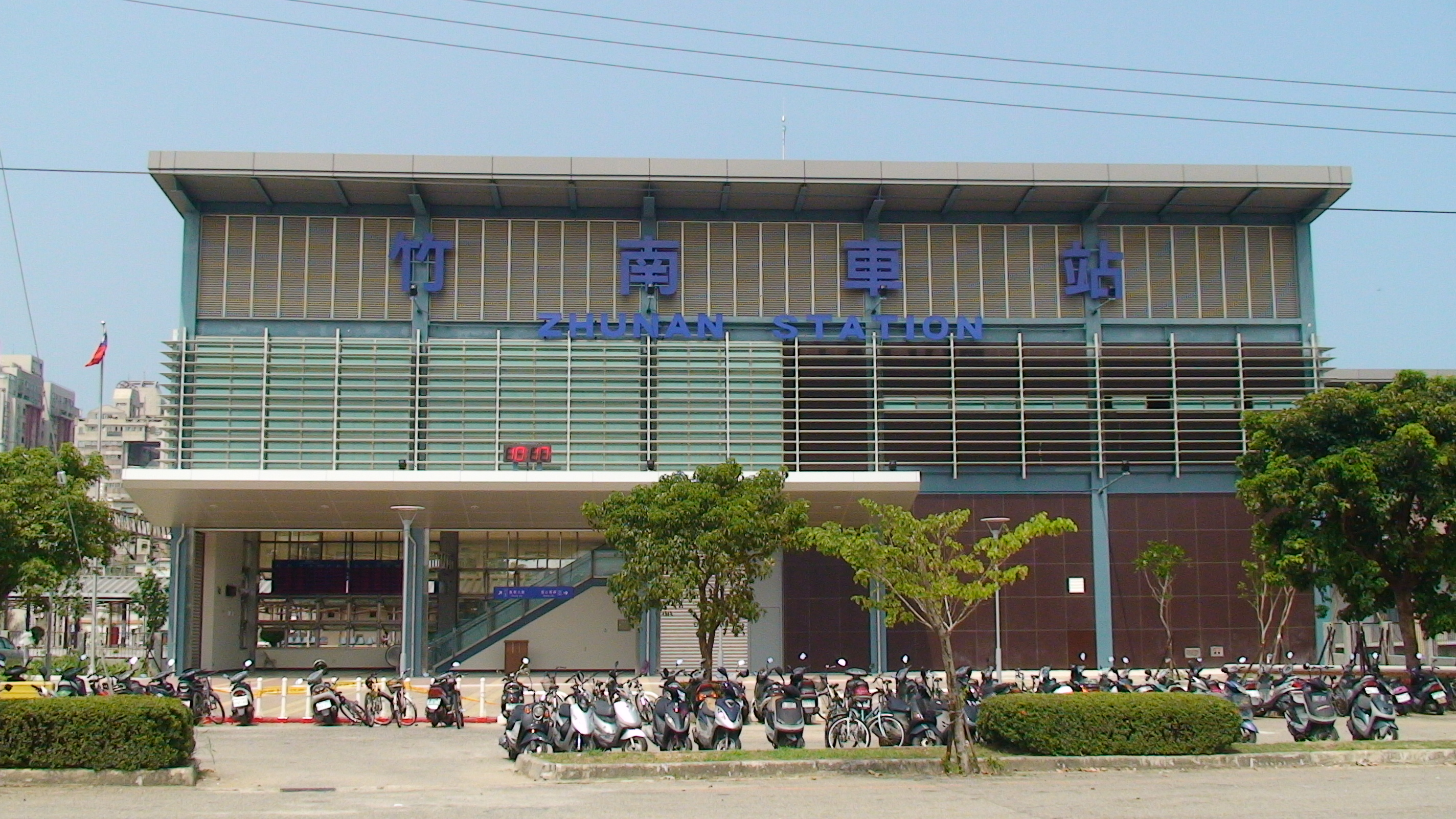
Zhunan Station

Zhunan is served by National Freeway 3 and Provincial Highway 61. The township is accessible from Zhunan Station and Qiding Station of Taiwan Railway.

== Notable natives ==
- Kang Shih-ju, member of Legislative Yuan (2009–2012)
- Tsai Wan-lin, former businessman
- Tsai Wan-tsai, former banker
