= Xuanwang Temple =

Temple in Miaoli County, Taiwan

- 宣王宮
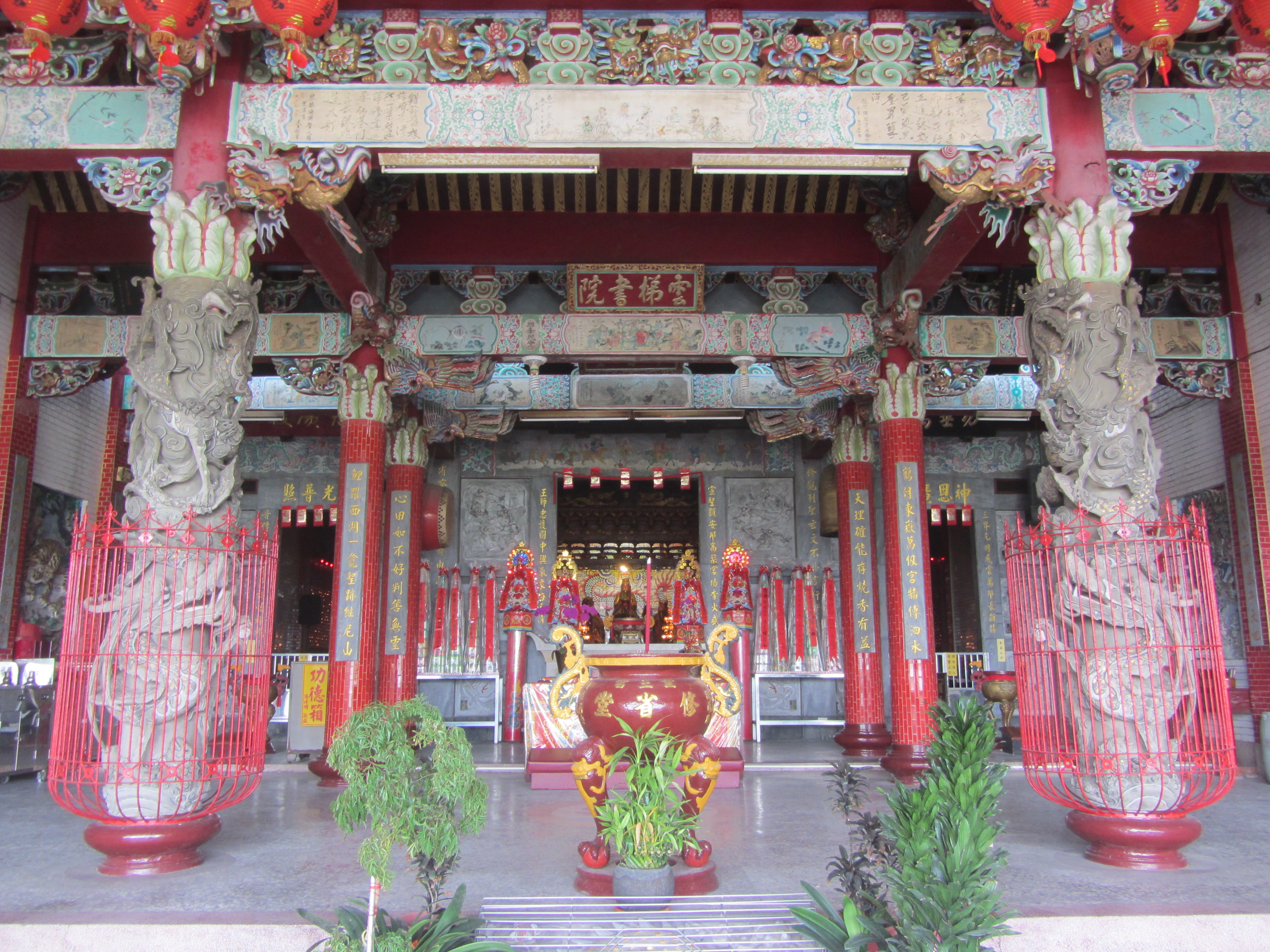

Religion
- Affiliation: Taoism
- Deity: Confucius

Location
- Location: Xihu, Miaoli County
- Country: Taiwan
- Interactive map of Xuanwang Temple
- Coordinates: 24.5313°N 120.7451°E

Architecture
- Completed: 1840
- Direction of façade: East

Xuanwang Temple (Chinese: 宣王宮; pinyin: Xuānwáng Gōng), formerly known as Yunti Academy (Chinese: 雲梯書院; pinyin: Yúntī Shūyuàn), is a temple in Xihu Township, Miaoli County, Taiwan. Established in 1829 as the first privately owned school (known as a shuyuan) in Miaoli, it was subsequently converted into a temple of Confucius under pressure from the Japanese government. In the temple, a tower for joss paper named Jingshengting and a Tudigong shrine are protected as county-level historic buildings.

== History ==
In 1829, Liu En-quan (劉恩寬) moved from Hui'an County in Fujian to Xihu. Liu established Yunti Academy at the current site of Ruihu Elementary school, making it the first shuyuan in Miaoli. In 1840, he moved the shuyuan to its current site, where he also set up shrines for Confucius and the five major literary gods (Wenchang Wang, Kui Xing, Zhuyi, Guan Yu, and Lü Dongbin).

After Taiwan was ceded to Japan in the 1895 Treaty of Shimonoseki, the Japanese government pressured private shuyuan to close in favor of Japanese education. In 1900, Yunti Academy closed and the building was turned into a Confucian temple named Xiusheng Temple (修省堂), but still served as a meeting place for local scholars. In 1976, the temple was rebuilt and renamed to Xuanwang Temple.

== Protected structures ==
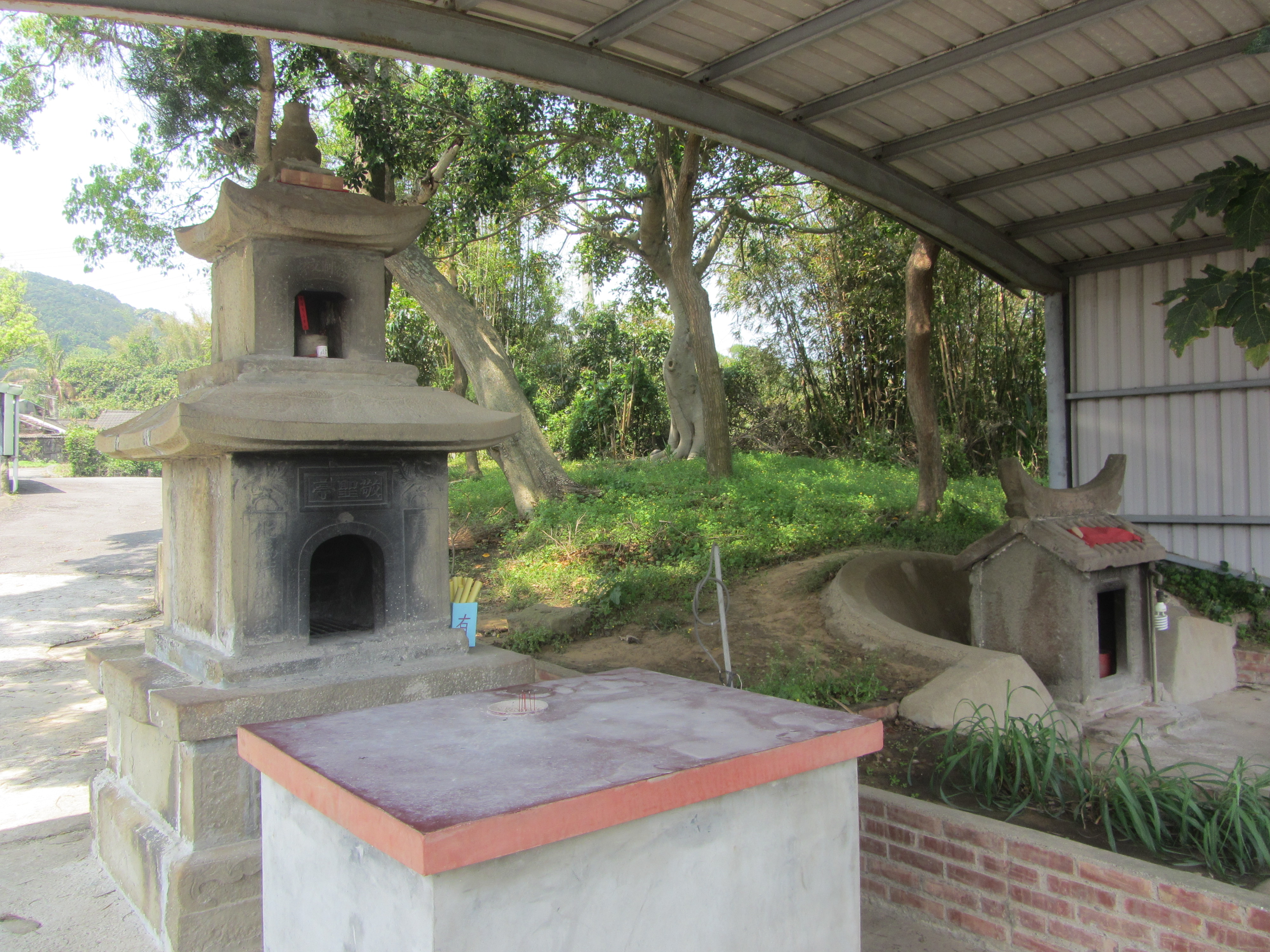
Jingshengting (left) and the Tudigong shrine (right)

On 21 October 2010, the Miaoli County Government protected two structures within Xuanwang Temple:

=== Jingshengting ===
Jingshengting (Chinese: 敬聖亭; pinyin: Jìngshèngtíng) is a sandstone furnace to burn joss paper. The structure is approximately three meters tall composed of a foundation, a hole for joss paper, and a shrine to Cangjie on top. This type of structure is known as a "cherish words tower" (惜字塔, xi zi ta) which were built because in the past, people considered it a privilege to be educated.

=== Tudigong shrine ===
The Tudigong shrine is located directly adjacent to Jingshengting. It is a small, rectangular shrine also carved out of sandstone. Inside, a stone table is placed engraved with "Fu De Zheng Shen", a formal honorary title for Tudigong.
