= Xihu, Miaoli =

Rural township in Miaoli County, Taiwan

Xihu Township 西湖鄉 Sihu
- Rural township
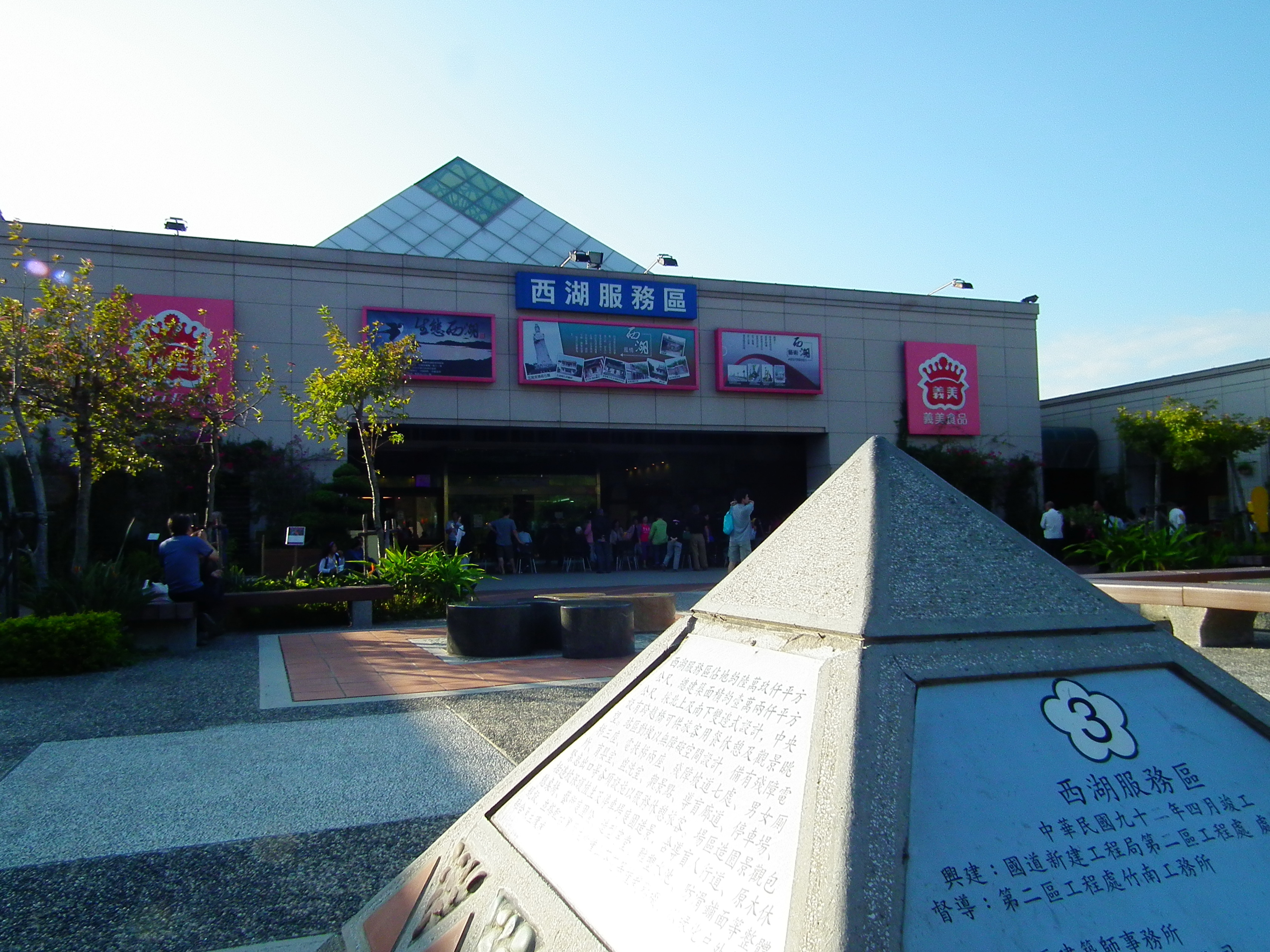
- Xihu Service Area

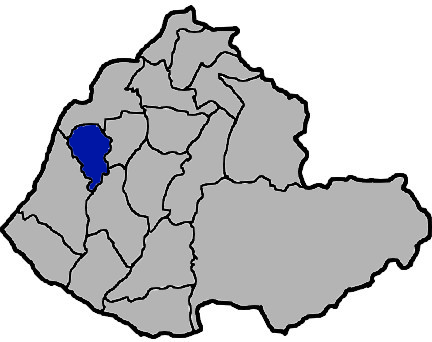
- Xihu Township in Miaoli County

- Location within Taiwan
- Location: Miaoli County, Taiwan

Area
  - Total: 41 km^{2} (16 sq mi)

Population (September 2023)
  - Total: 6,284
  - Density: 150/km^{2} (400/sq mi)
- Website: www.xihu.gov.tw (in Chinese)

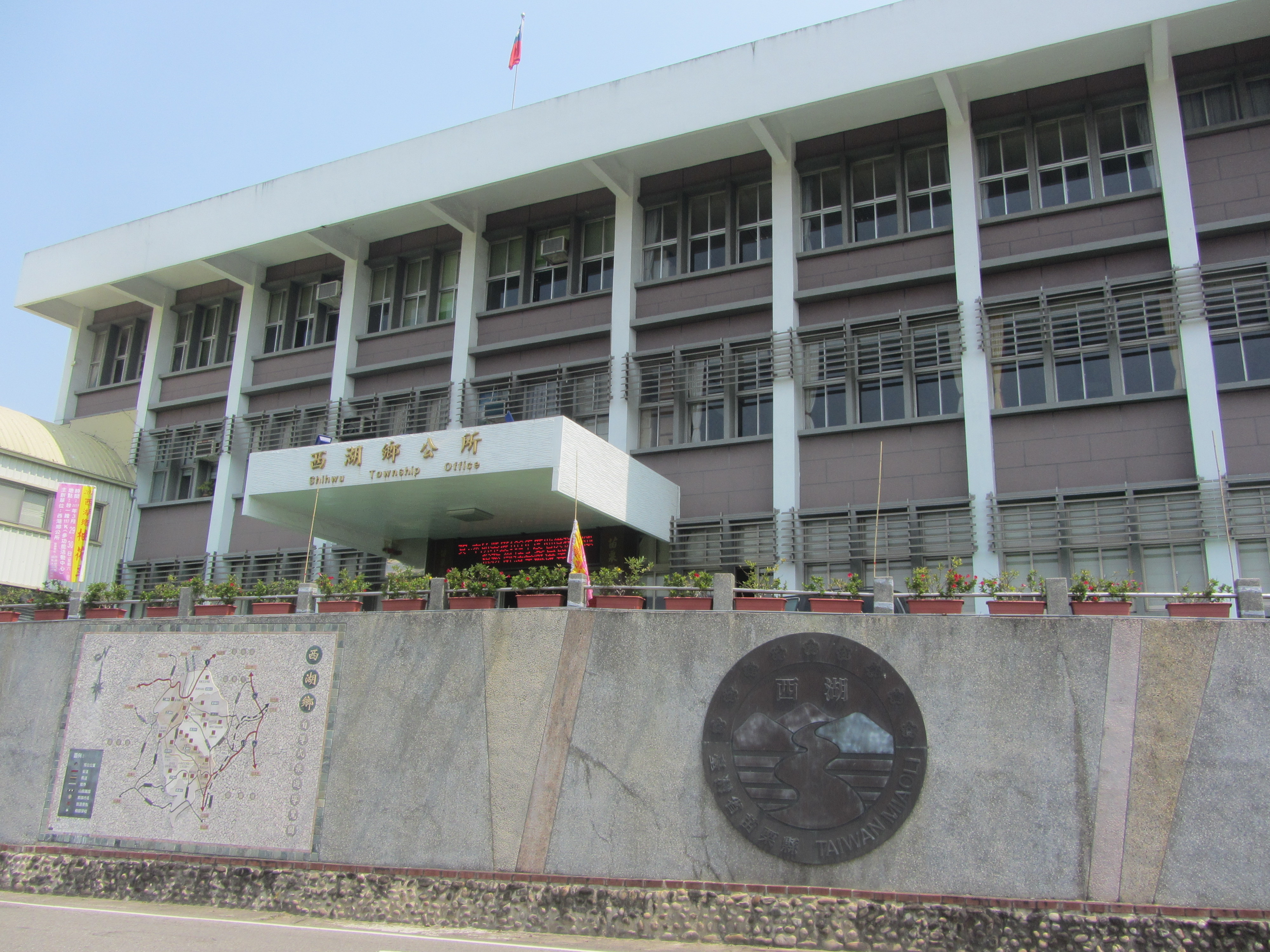
Xihu Township Office

Xihu Township (Chinese: 西湖鄉; pinyin: Xīhú Xiāng; Pe̍h-ōe-jī: Se-ô· hiong) is a rural township in Miaoli County, Taiwan.

== Geography ==
Xihu is surrounded by Miaoli City on its east, Houlong to the north, Tongxiao to the west, and Tongluo to the south. In September 2023, its population was estimated at 6,284.

== Administrative divisions ==
The township comprises nine villages: Erhu, Gaopu, Hutung, Jinshi, Longdong, Sanhu, Sihu, Wuhu and Xiapu.

== Tourist attractions ==
- Matsu Rock Sculpture
- Wu Chuo-liu Art and Cultural Hall
- Xuanwang Temple

== Transportation ==
Taiwan High Speed Rail passes through the central part of the township, but no station is currently planned.
