= NUU =

NUU may refer to:

- University of Ulster at Coleraine in Northern Ireland, United Kingdom
- National United University in Miaoli County, Taiwan
