= Miaoli railway station =

Railway station located in Miaoli, Taiwan

Miaoli 苗栗
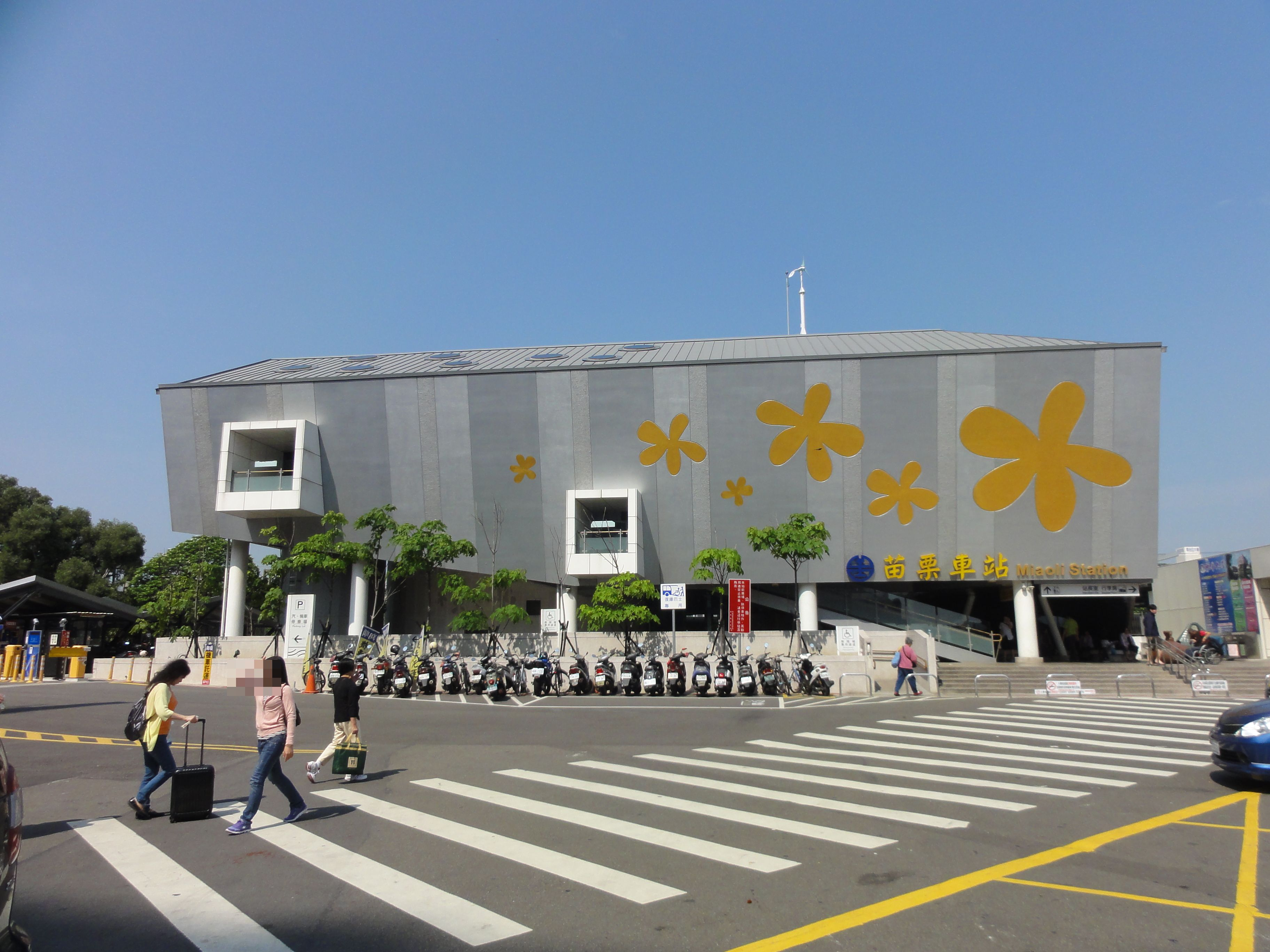

Chinese name
- Traditional Chinese: 苗栗
Transcriptions
Standard Mandarin
- Hanyu Pinyin: Miáolì
- Bopomofo: ㄇㄧㄠˊ ㄌㄧˋ
Hakka
- Romanization: Měu-lid (Sixian dialect); Miau-lìd (Hailu dialect)
Southern Min
- Tâi-lô: Biâu-li̍k; Miâu-li̍k

General information
- Location: 1 Weigong Rd; Miaoli, Miaoli County; Taiwan
- Coordinates: 24.5700°N 120.8223°E
- System: Taiwan Railway railway station
- Line: Western Trunk line
- Distance: 140.6 km to Keelung
- Connections: Local bus; Coach

Construction
- Structure type: Ground level

Other information
- Station code: T03 (statistical)
- Classification: First class (Chinese: 一等)
- Website: www.railway.gov.tw/miaoli (in Chinese)

History
- Opened: 25 May 1903
- Electrified: 18 July 1978
- Former names: Byōritsu (Japanese: 苗栗)

Passengers
- 2017: 4.426 million per year ▲0.55%
- Rank: 29 out of 228

Services
Preceding station	Taiwan Railway	Following station
Fengfu towards Keelung	Western Trunk line	Nanshi towards Kaohsiung
Location
- Location within Taiwan

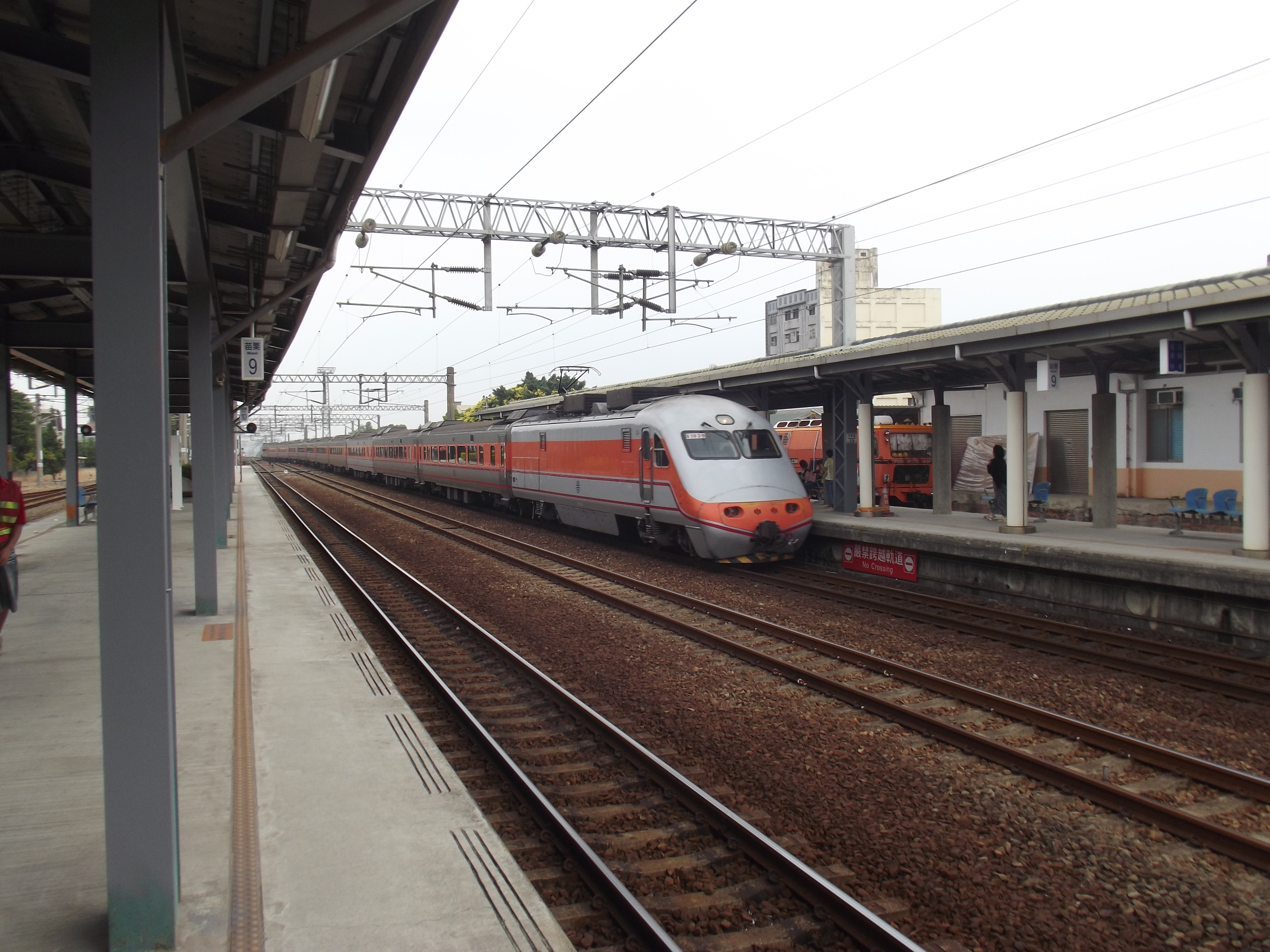
Miaoli station platform

Miaoli (Chinese: 苗栗; pinyin: Miáolì) is a railway station in Miaoli County, Taiwan served by Taiwan Railway.

== Overview ==
The station has one side platform and one island platform. It also has a tourist information center. Miaoli station is an important station on the Taichung line and has facilities for freight/cargo services.

== History ==
- 25 May 1903: The station was built in the Japanese-era as Byōritsu-eki (苗栗驛).
- 1930: The station was reconstructed as a brick building.
- 21 April 1935: After the 1935 Shinchiku-Taichū earthquake, the station was rebuilt.
- 24 April 1935: The station train depot was reconstructed.
- 1943: The station was destroyed by bombing during the Pacific War.
- August 1955: Due to increased traffic at the station, platform 1 was reconstructed, the elevated walkway was demolished, and a new tunnel was constructed.
- November 1975: The third-generation station was reconstructed using reinforced concrete as a two-story station.
- 1978: The second story and the station entrance were reconstructed to include a clock.
- 1997: Due to the construction for double-tracking of the Mountain line, the station was once again reconstructed including the entrance, the platforms, and expansion of the station.
- 11 October 1998: After the completion of the double-tracking project, the station became a stop.
- 10 June 1999: The TRA Railroad Museum opened for service.
- 1 November 2006: The Fu-an Underground Passage opened for use.
- 25 June 2008: The Taroko Express began servicing the station.
- 16 June 2009: The station became an origin point for the Tzu-Chiang Limited Express.
- 29 October 2010: The construction for a cross-platform station design began.
- 22 December 2010: As part of the 100th anniversary celebrations of the Republic of China, the TRA began running a Miaoli to Hualien service (via the South-link line).

== Platform layout ==
=== Passenger service ===
1	1	■ West Coast line (southbound)	Toward Taichung, Chiayi, Kaohsiung, Pingtung
2	(no platform)	■ Transfer line	Parking/Transfer Track
3	2A	■ West Coast line (northbound)	Toward Taoyuan, Taipei, Qidu, Keelung
3	2A	■ Eastern line (cross-line southbound)	Toward Yilan, Suao, Hualien, Taitung
4	2B	■ West Coast line (southbound, originating)	Toward Kaohsiung, Pingtung, Taitung, Hualien
4	2B	■ West Coast line - Coastal line (northbound, originating via the Chengzhui line)	Toward Yuanli, Taipei, Hualien, Taitung
4	2B	■ West Coast line (northbound, originating)	Toward Keelung, Suao, Hualien, Taitung
4	2B	■ West Coast line (southbound, originating)	Toward Changhua, Douliu, Chiayi, Kaohsiung

=== Freight service ===
1	1	■ West Coast line (freight); North/southbound	Toward Taitung, Taoyuan, Taipei, Keelung
1	1	■ West Coast line (freight); Cross-line north/southbound	Toward Yilan, Suao, Hualien, Kaohsiung

== Around the station ==
- Miaoli County Government
- Miaoli County Urban Planning Exhibition Center
- Miaoli Railway Museum
- National United University
- Carrefour Miaoli Branch
- Fengnian St. Night Market
- Cultural Center Night Market
- Station Front Market
- Miaoli Yiming Temple
- Zhongshan Rd. Old Street
- Zhongzheng Rd. Old Street
- Miaoli County Public Library
- Miaoli County Government International Culture Center

== See also ==
- List of railway stations in Taiwan
