= Yuqing Temple =

Temple in Miaoli City, Taiwan

- 玉清宮
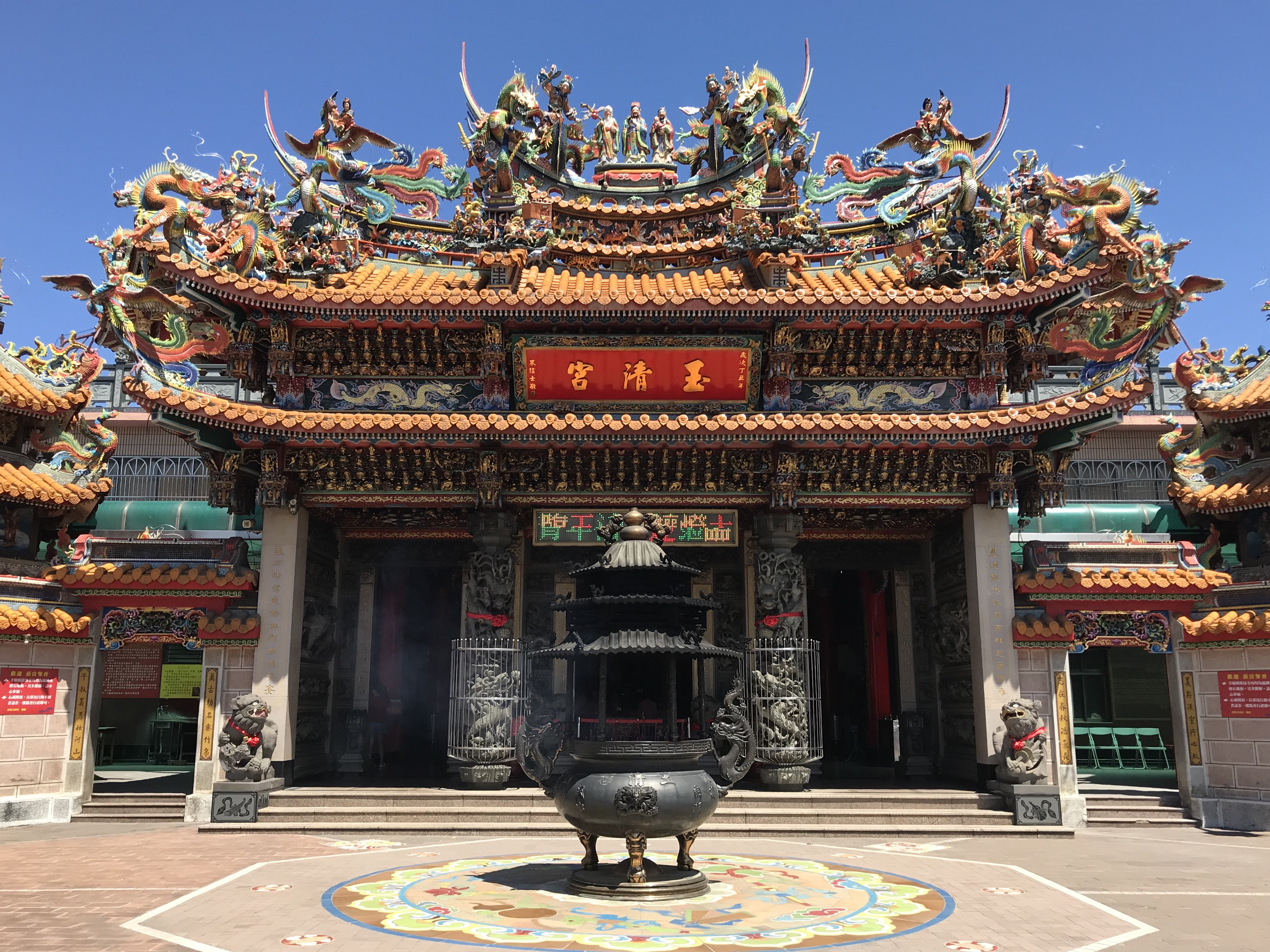

Religion
- Affiliation: Taoism
- Deity: Guan Yu

Location
- Location: Miaoli City, Miaoli County
- Country: Taiwan
- Interactive map of Yuqing Temple
- Coordinates: 24.5647°N 120.8266°E

Architecture
- Completed: 1906
- Direction of façade: South

Miaoli Yuqing Temple (Chinese: 苗栗玉清宮; pinyin: Miáolì Yùqīng Gōng) is a temple located in Miaoli City, Miaoli County, Taiwan. The temple is dedicated to Lord Guan or Guansheng Dijun (關聖帝君), the deified form of Guan Yu.

== History ==
The temple was established in 1906 by Hu Atong (胡阿統), though the building's construction was not completed until 1917. The temple was also known by many other names, including Guanyin Temple (觀音宮) and Potangxia Yuqing Temple (坡塘下玉清宮). The temple was heavily damaged by the 1935 Shinchiku-Taichū earthquake, but was crudely repaired. In 1965, local politician Tang Qingsong (湯慶松) called for the temple's renovation, and the original building was replaced by a reinforced concrete structure in 1967. Other buildings were also constructed on the temple's premises, including a senior citizens' center in 1976, a park in 1986, and a paifang in 1996.

== Structure ==
The main hall of Yuqing Temple is dedicated to Lord Guan or Guansheng Dijun (關聖帝君), whose statue is accompanied by Fuyou Dijun (孚佑帝君) and the Siming Zhenjun (司命真君). Altars to other deities are located on the sides and on the second floor. Yuqing Temple also has a public park located next to the front courtyard, which is designed with Chinese garden architecture and features a large statue of Lord Guan on his horse overlooking the courtyard.

== Traditions ==
Every year during Lantern Festival, Yuqing Temple holds a festival known as "Dragon Bombing" (Chinese: 𪹚龍; pinyin: Bànglóng), which is common among Hakka communities. The ceremony involves dragon dances where each dragon's eyes are painted with a mixture of chicken blood, rice wine, and cinnabar. During the ceremony, the dragons form a gate for worshippers to walk through, which is said to bring good fortune.

Yuqing Temple is the first temple in Miaoli County to not burn joss paper. The temple stopped the practice in 1999 to reduce its environmental impact, and the furnace outside the temple is covered up. The temple does continue to burn incense.

== Gallery ==
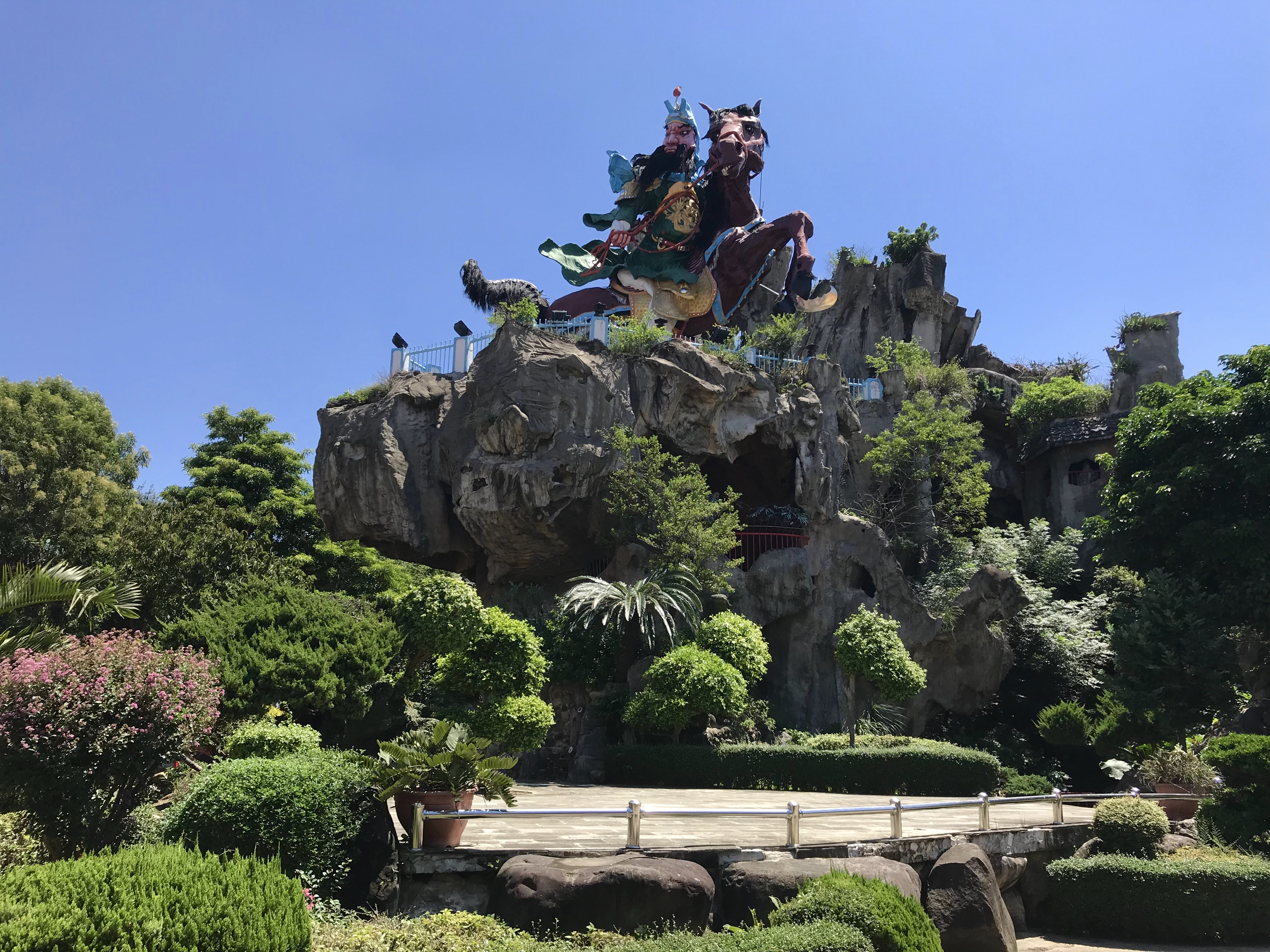
Lord Guan statue in Yuqing Park

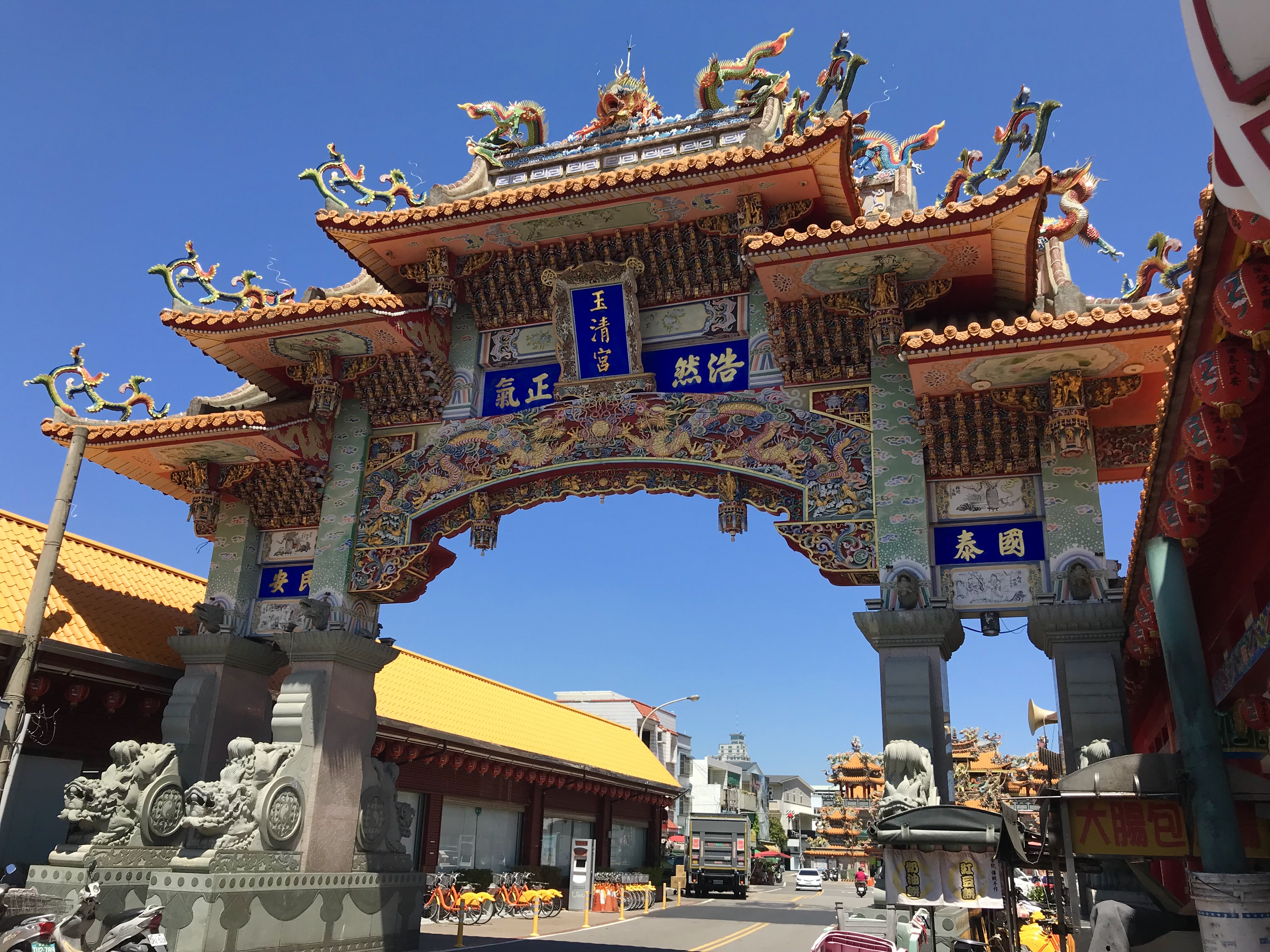
Paifang

== See also ==
- Lukang Wen Wu Temple
- Sun Moon Lake Wen Wu Temple
- Xingtian Temple
- List of temples in Taiwan
