= Wu Chuo-liu Art and Cultural Hall =

Arts and cultural center in Xihu, Miaoli County, Taiwan

- 吳濁流文學藝術館
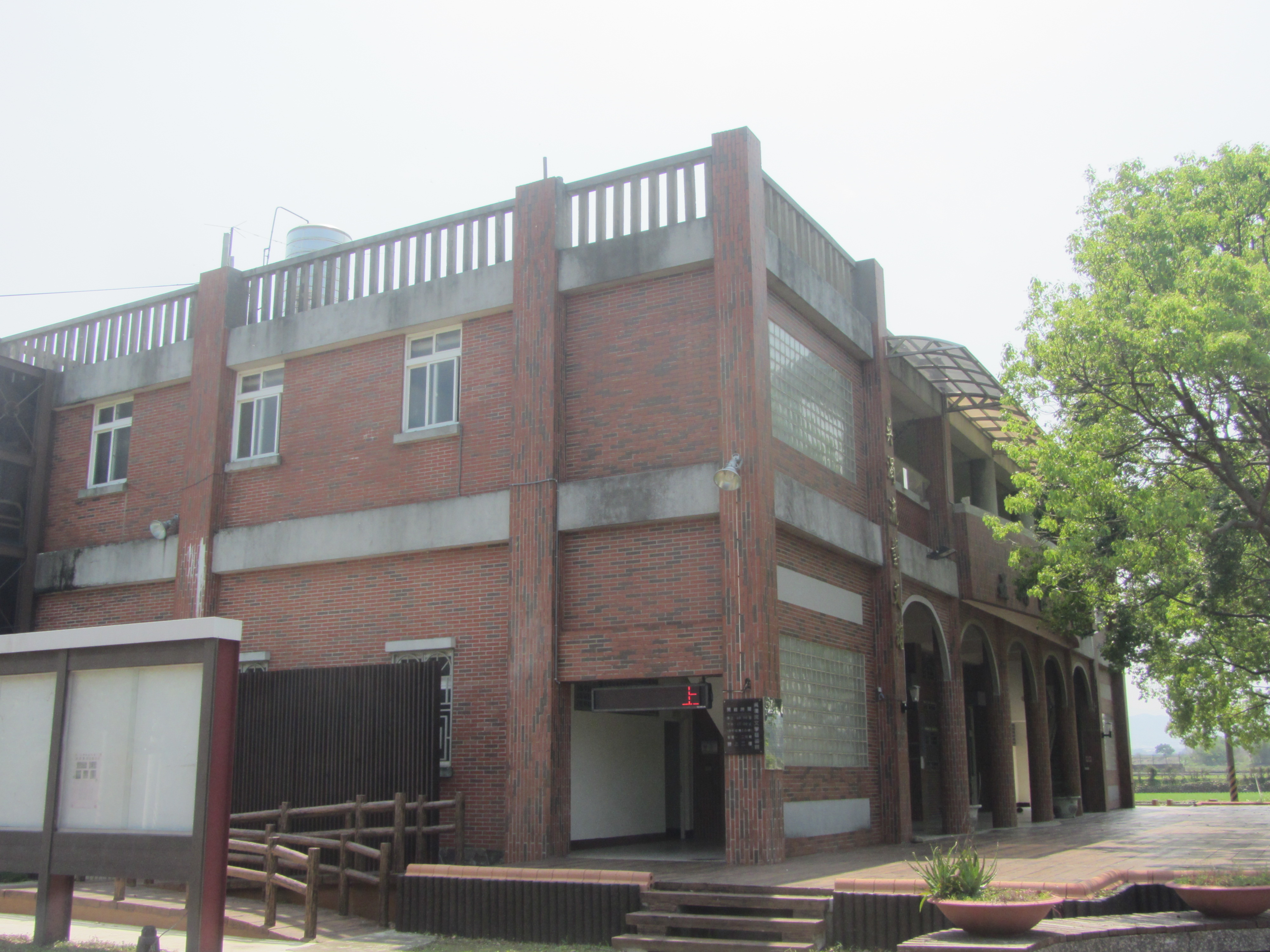
- Interactive map of Wu Chuo-liu Art and Cultural Hall
- Location: Xihu, Miaoli County, Taiwan
- Coordinates: 24°31′28.8″N 120°46′13.2″E
- Type: art and cultural center
- Public transit: Nanshi Station

The Wu Chuo-liu Art and Cultural Hall (traditional Chinese: 吳濁流文學藝術館; simplified Chinese: 吴浊流文学艺术馆; pinyin: Wú Zhuóliú Wénxué Yìshùguǎn) is an art and cultural center in Xihu Township, Miaoli County, Taiwan dedicated to Wu Chuo-liu for his contribution to Taiwanese literature.

== Exhibitions ==
The hall displays the renowned works of Wu Chuo-liu. It also acts to gather the literature, art, tourism, local attraction and cultural resources in the cultural construction campaign.

== Transportation ==
The hall is accessible within walking distance west of Nanshi Station of Taiwan Railway.

== See also ==
- List of tourist attractions in Taiwan
