= Miaoli Railway Museum =

Museum in Miaoli City, Miaoli County, Taiwan

- 苗栗鐵道文物展示館
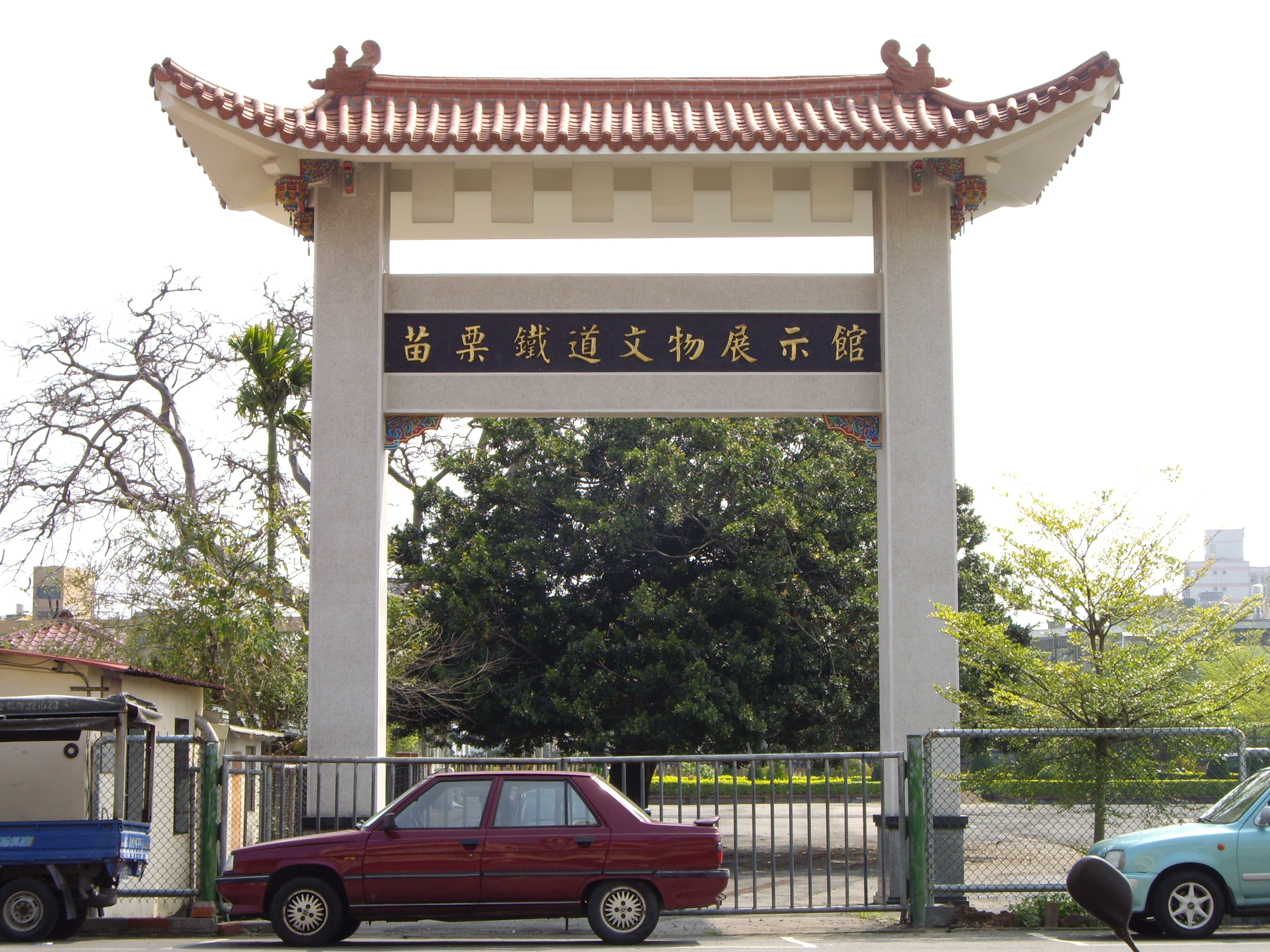
- Established: 10 June 1999
- Location: Miaoli City, Miaoli County, Taiwan
- Coordinates: 24°34′04″N 120°49′19″E
- Type: transport museum
- Website: www.railway.gov.tw/Miaoli

The Miaoli Railway Museum (traditional Chinese: 苗栗鐵道文物展示館; simplified Chinese: 苗栗铁道文物展示馆; pinyin: Miáolì Zhídào Wénwù Zhǎnshìguǎn) is a railway park in Miaoli City, Miaoli County, Taiwan.

== History ==
The museum will open up a new railway park within its vicinity in 2023, which will display several locomotives and railway-related artifacts. It is built on a 1.91 hectares of land and cost NT$1 billion.

The original operator of the railway park unexpectedly terminated its lease on the property in September 2024. In November, a new operator was selected and the park is now anticipated to open as early as April 2025.

== Diesel locomotives ==
- TRA Class R0 diesel-electric locomotive R6
- TRA Class S300 diesel-electric locomotive S305
- TRA Class S400 diesel-electric locomotive S405
- TRA LDH101 Narrow track 762mm diesel-hydraulic locomotives
- Taiwan Alishan Railway 11403-5 diesel-mechanical locomotive
- Taiwan Alishan Railway 11403-1 diesel-mechanical locomotive

== Steam locomotives ==
- TRA Class CT150 steam locomotive CT152
- TRA Class DT560 steam locomotive DT561
- Taiwan Alishan Railway number 28 Shay locomotive
- Taiwan Sugar Corporation number 331 tank locomotive

== Passenger cars ==
- 30SP2502
- 25TPK2053
- LTPB1813
- SPC2

== Work train ==
- Taiwan Sugar Corporation number 254 Draisine

== Railway monuments and historic buildings ==
- Locomotive garage
- Railway turntable

== Transportation ==
The museum is in walking distance south of Miaoli Station of Taiwan Railway.

== Gallery ==
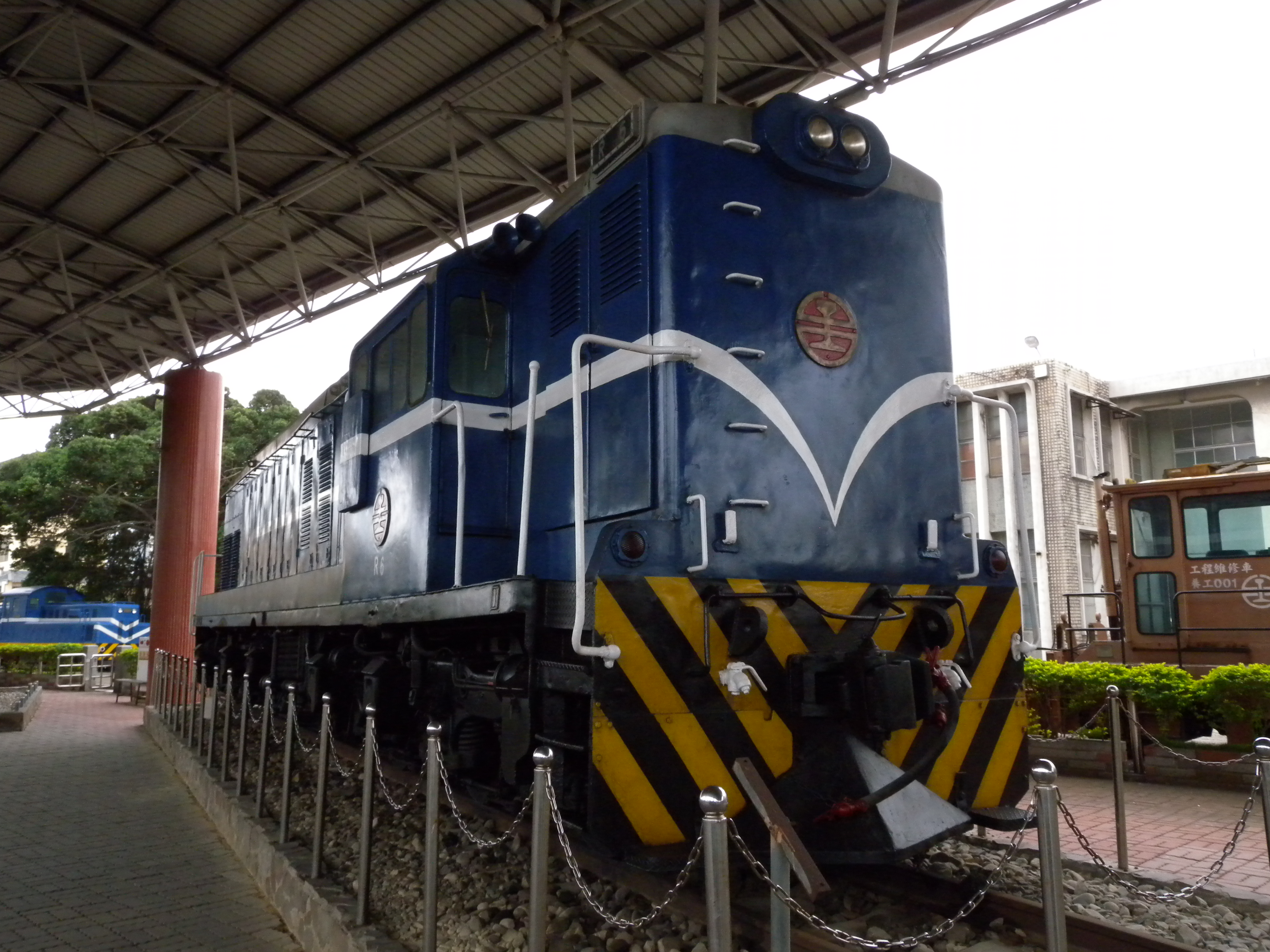
Taiwan Railway Class R0 R6 Diesel locomotive

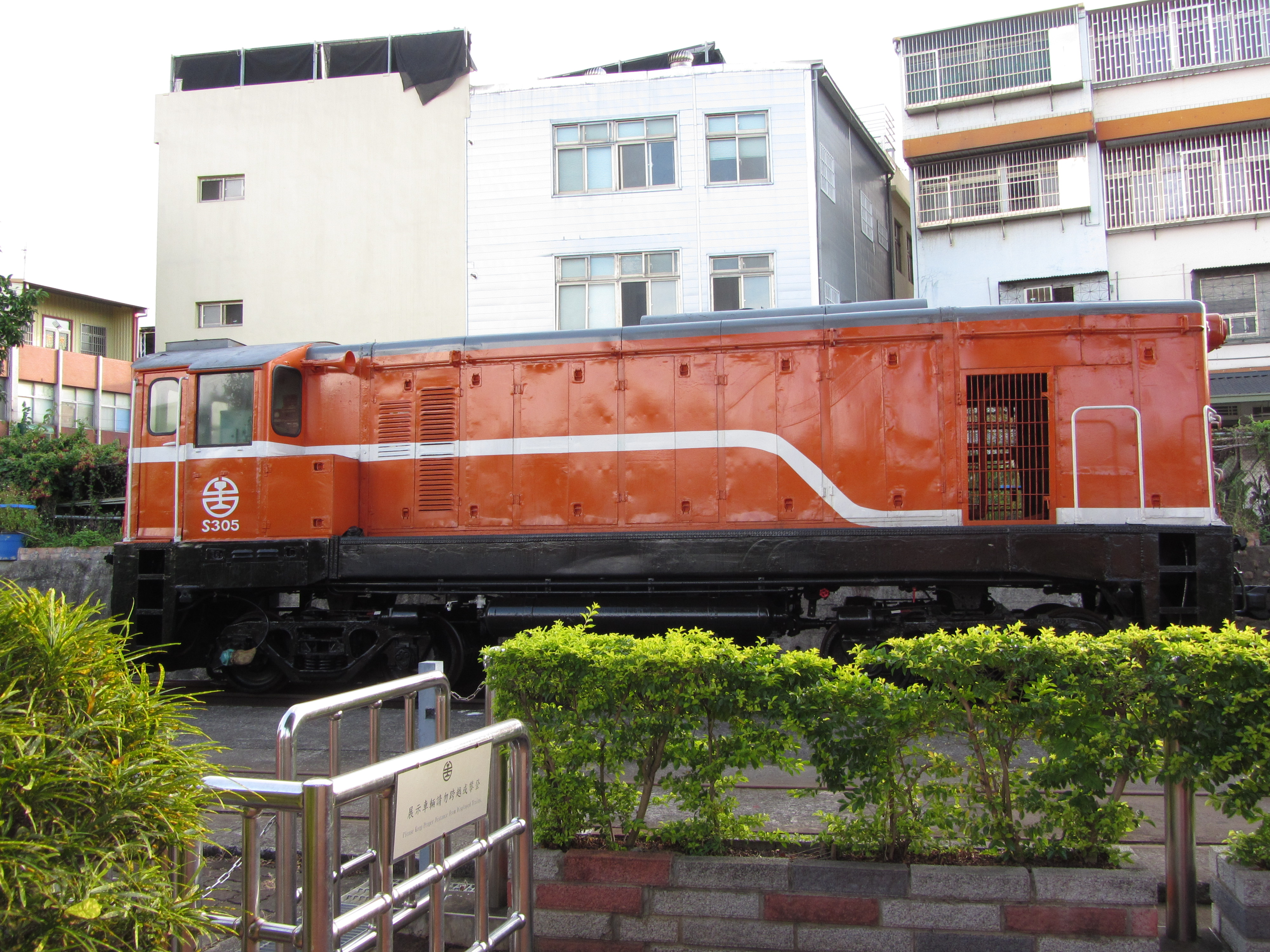
Taiwan Railway Class S300 S305 Diesel locomotive

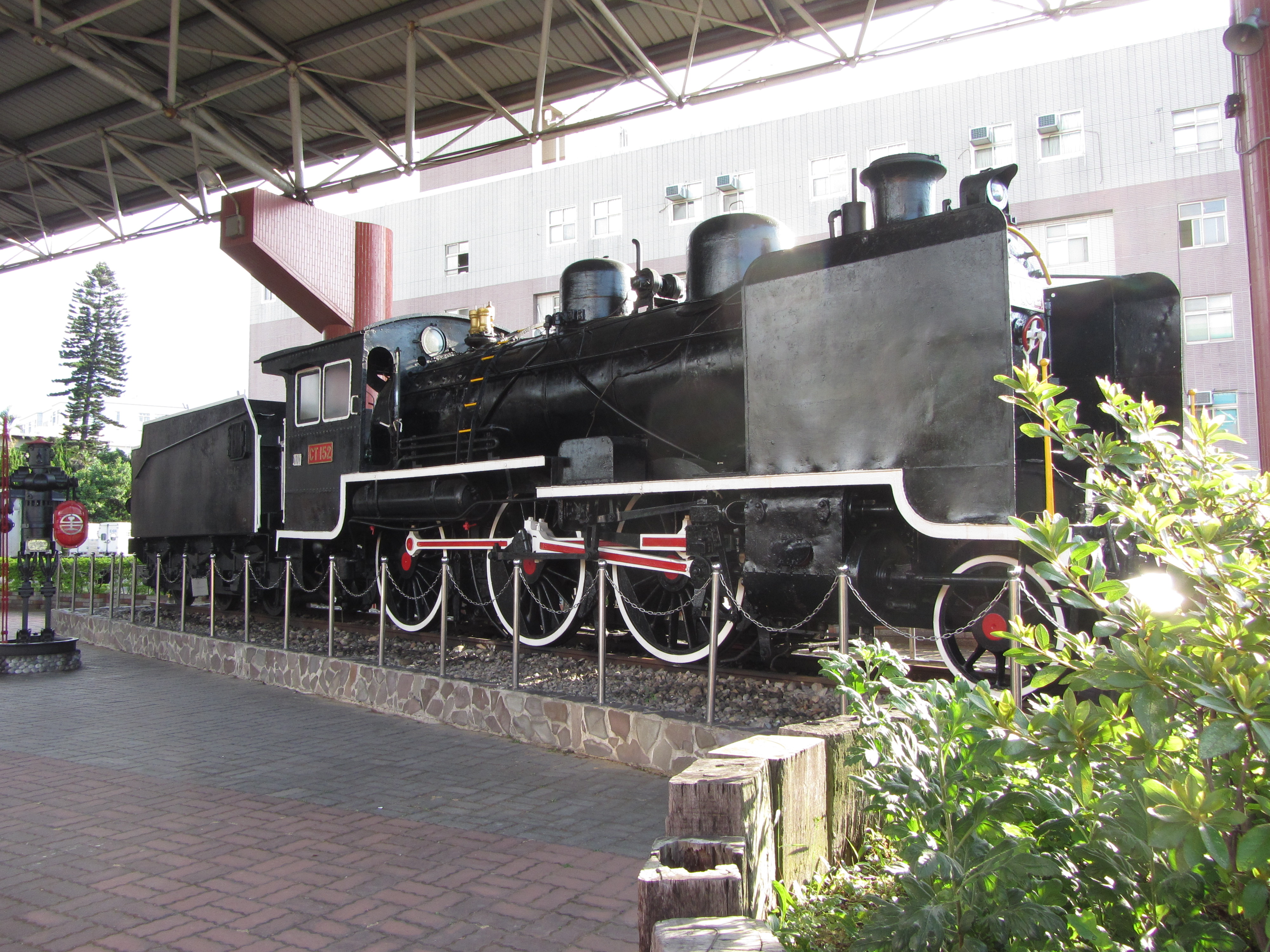
Taiwan Railway CT152 steam locomotive

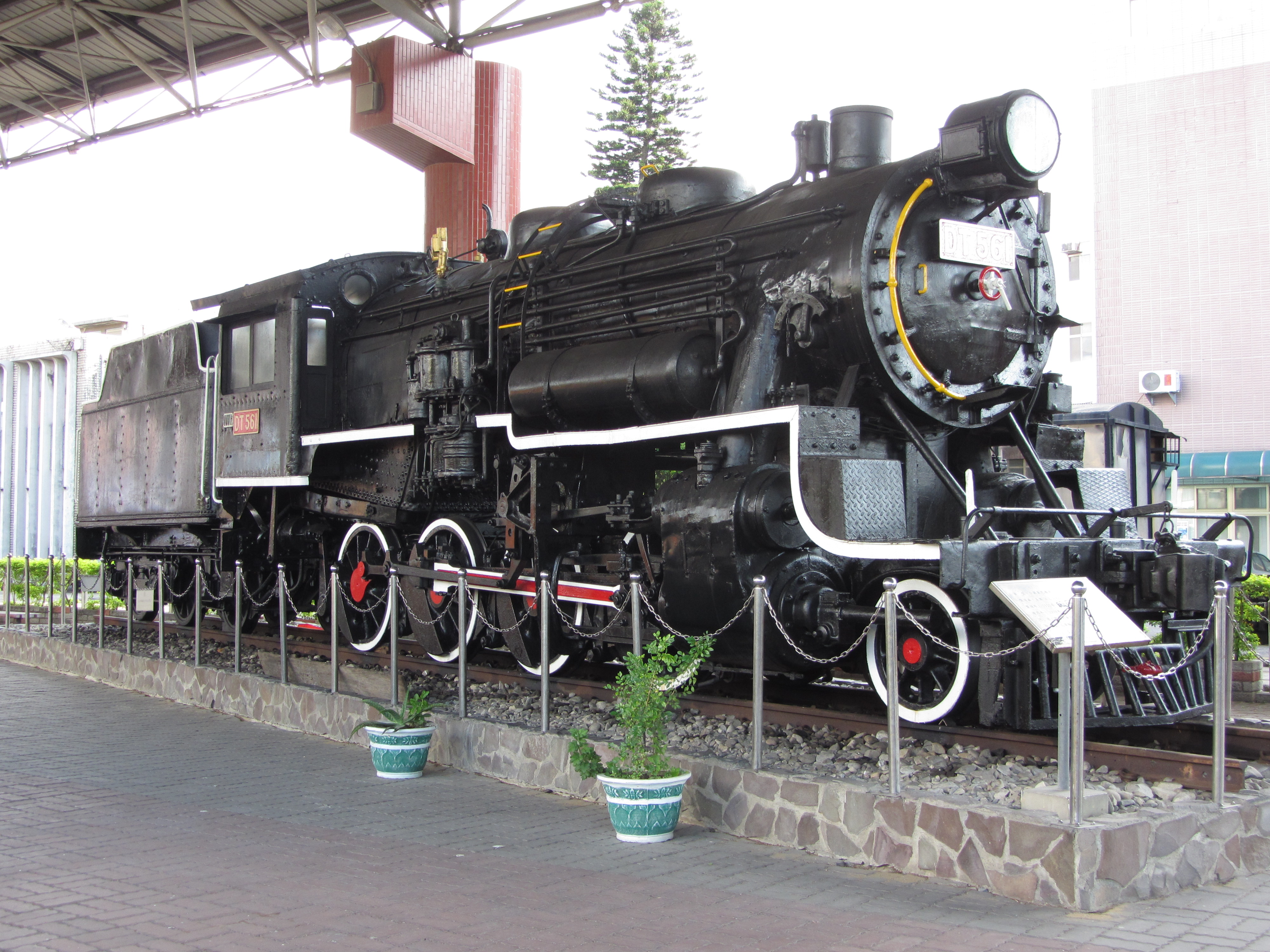
Taiwan Railway DT561 steam locomotive

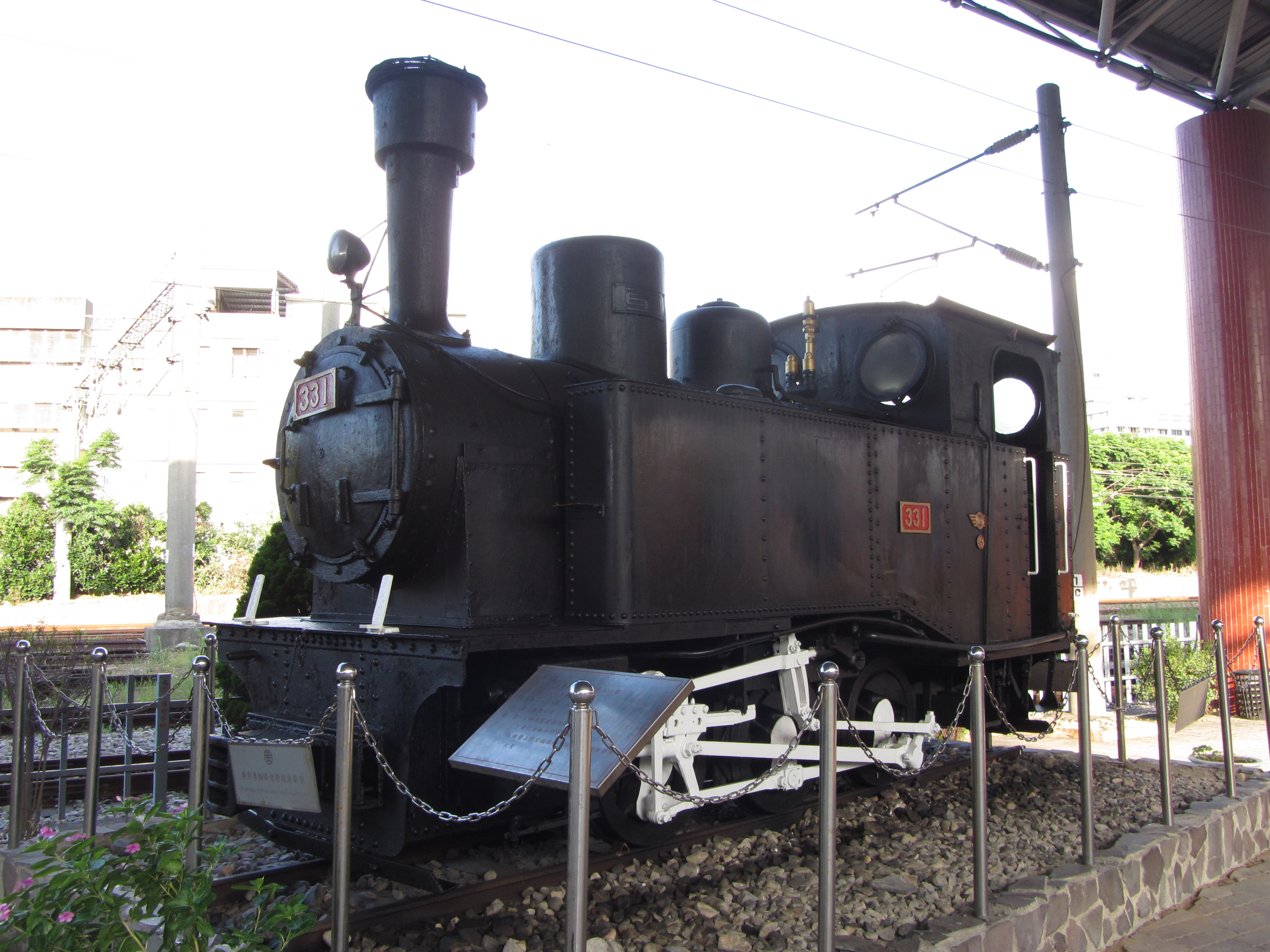
Taiwan Sugar Corporation number 331 tank locomotive

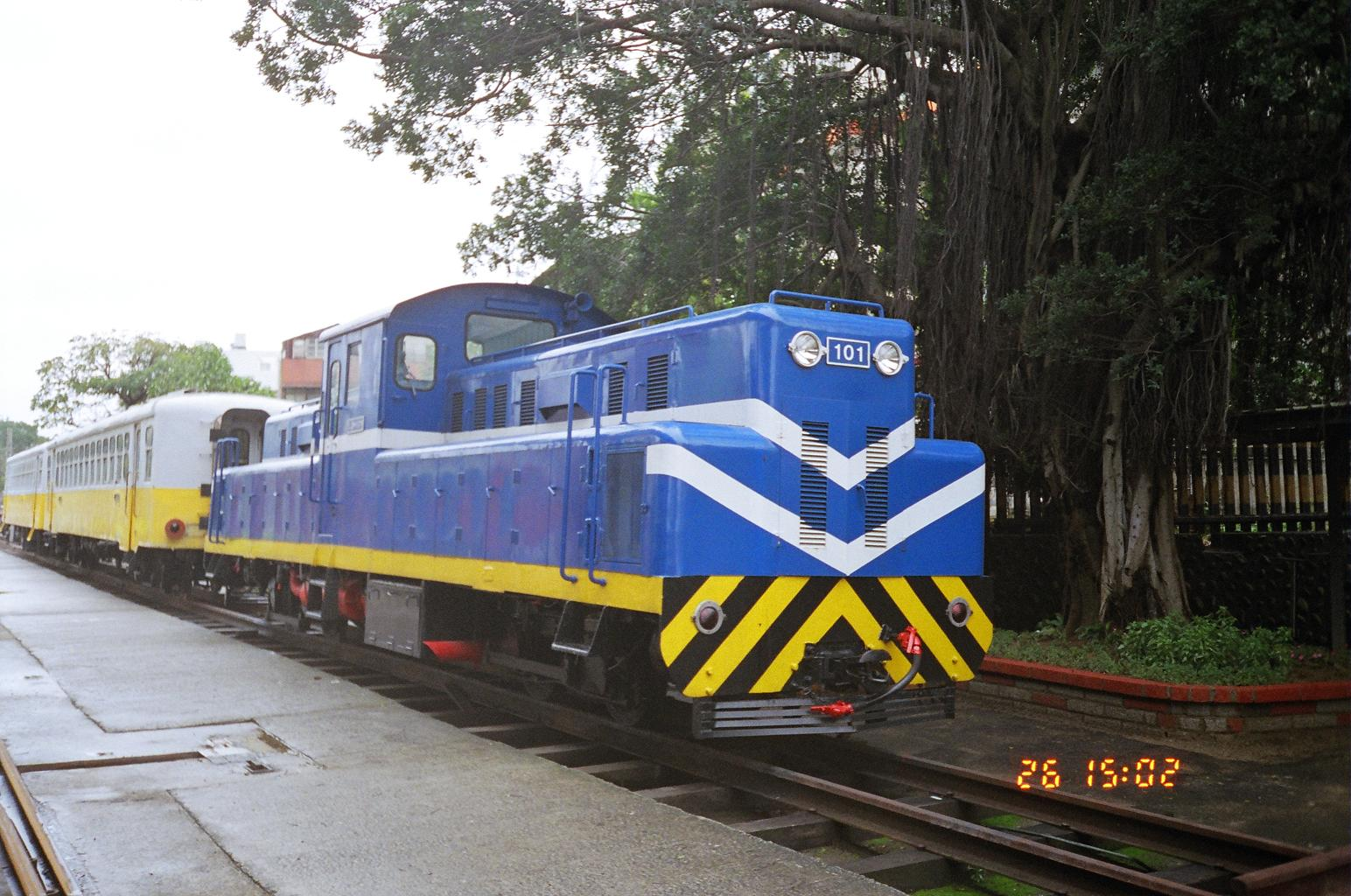
Taiwan Railway LDH101 Narrow track 762mm Diesel-Hydraulic locomotive

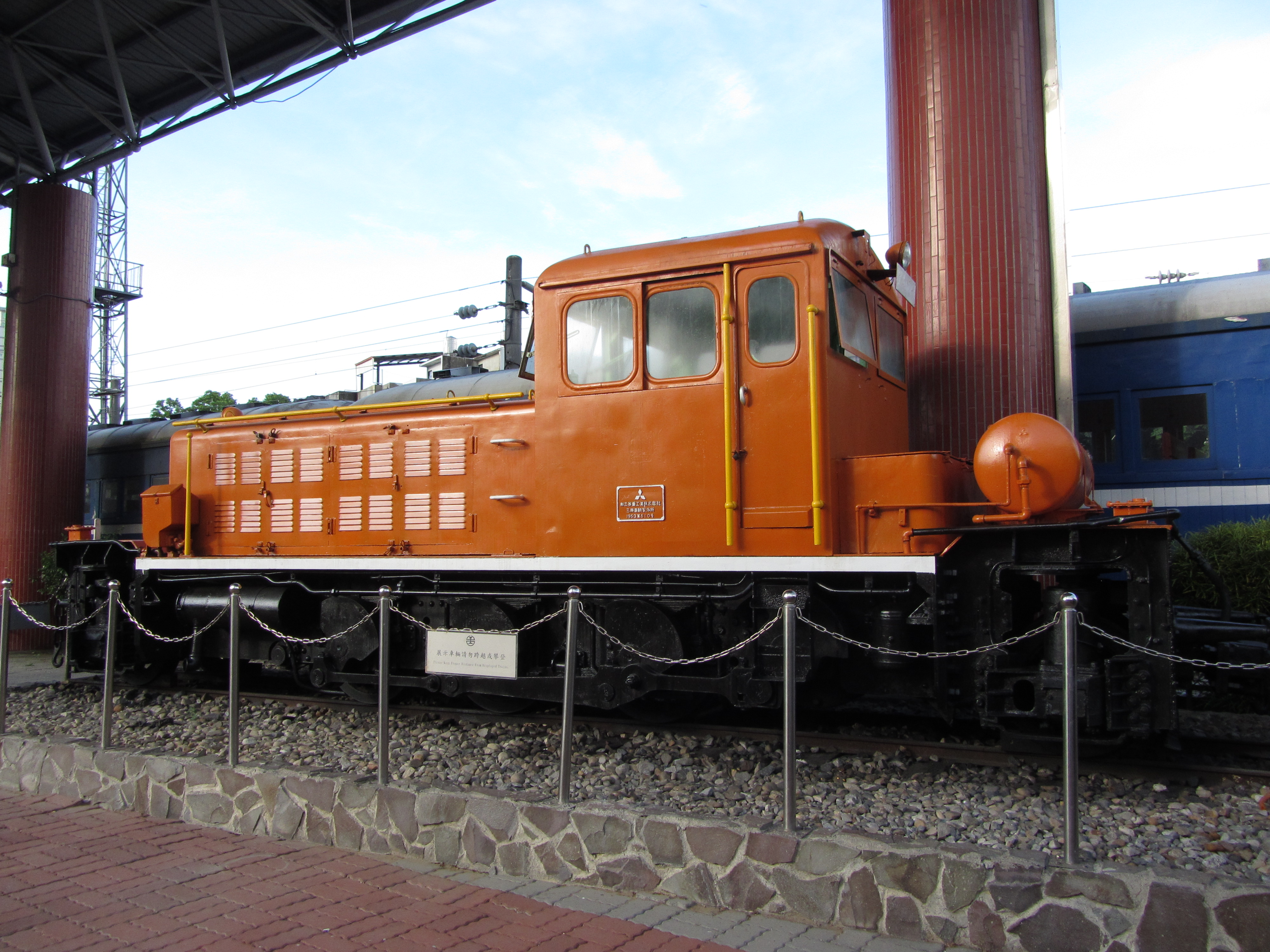
Taiwan Alishan Railway 11403-1 Diesel locomotive

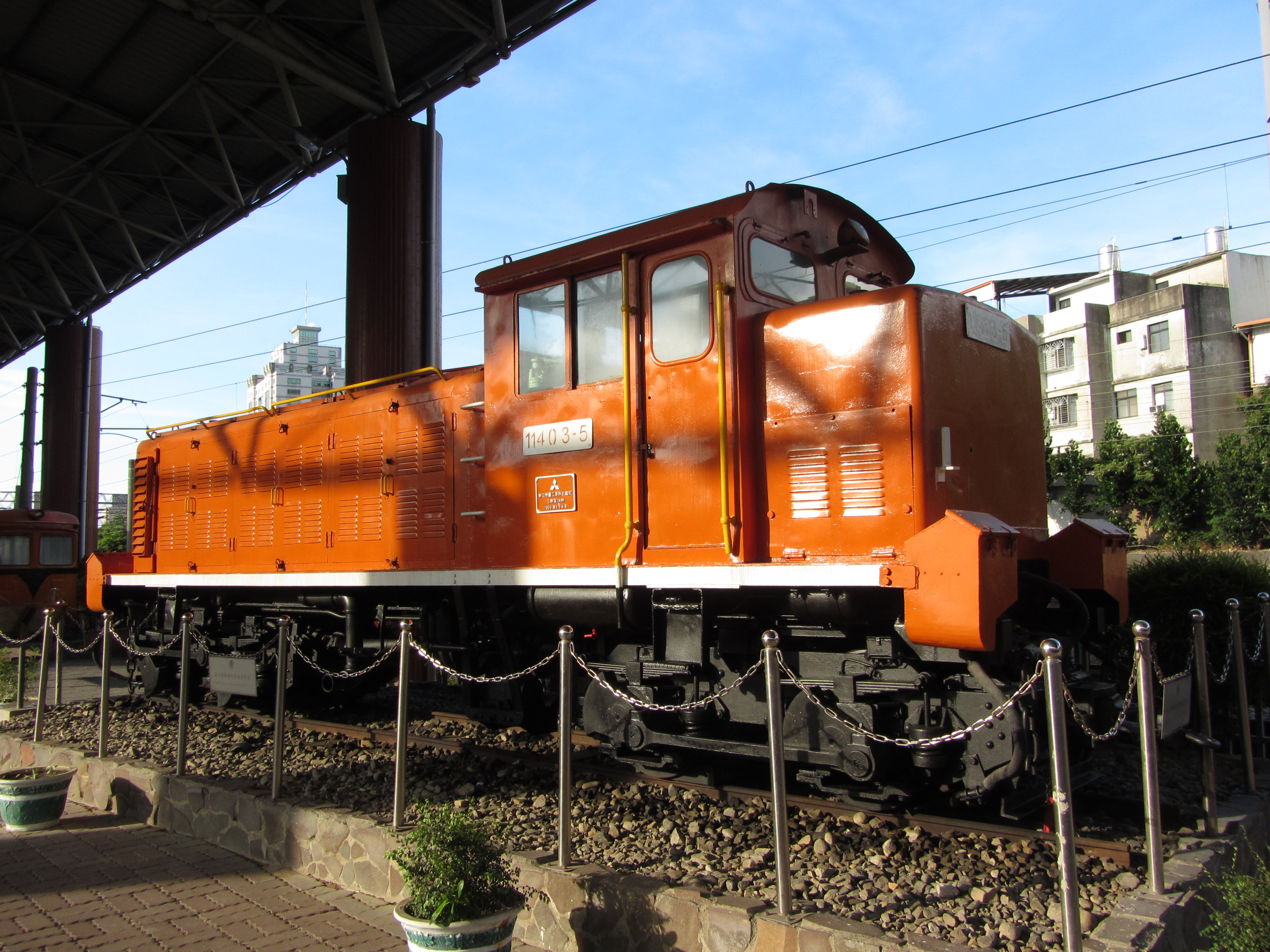
Taiwan Alishan Railway 11403-5 Diesel locomotive

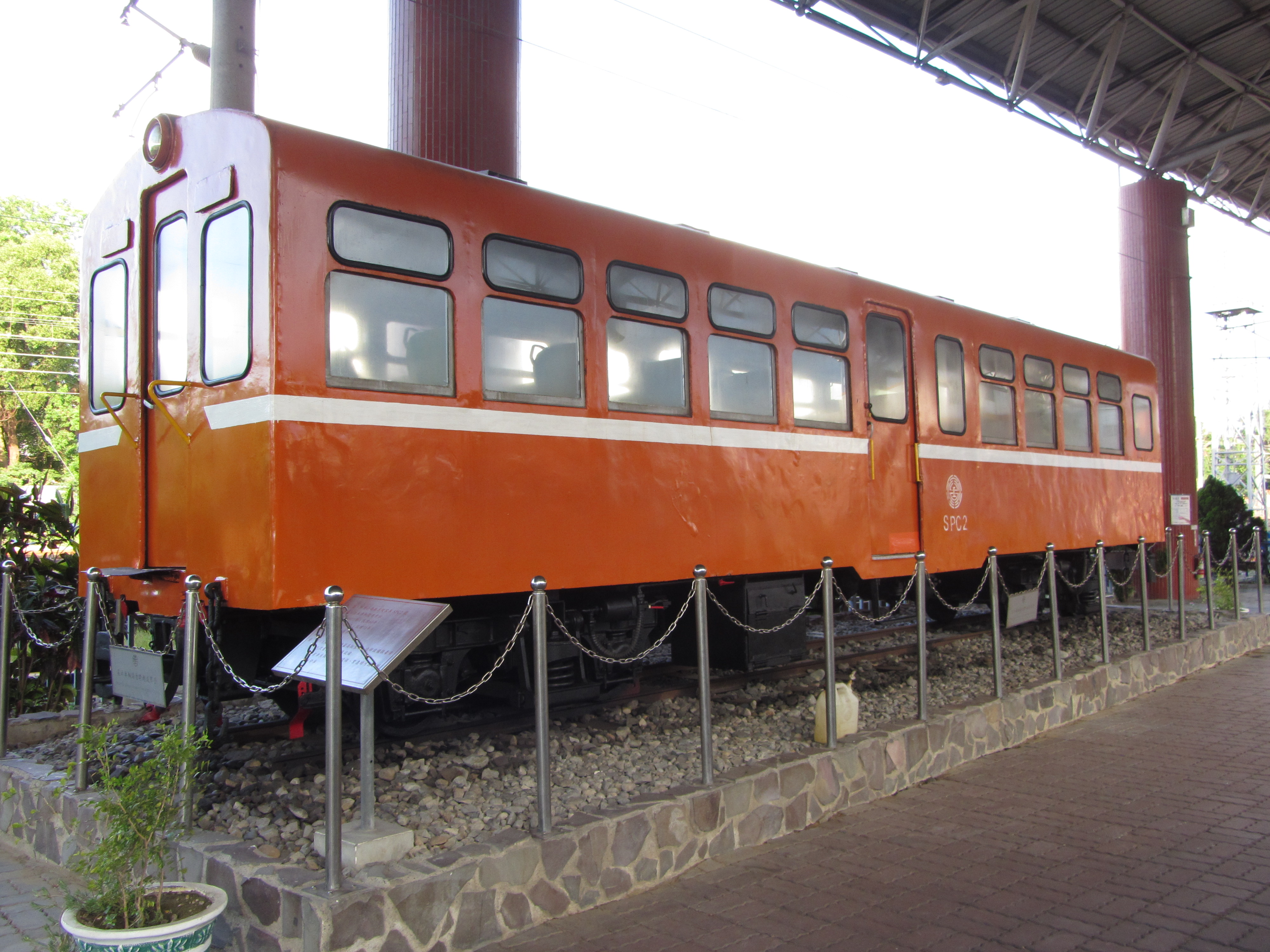
Taiwan Alishan Railway Guangfu passenger car

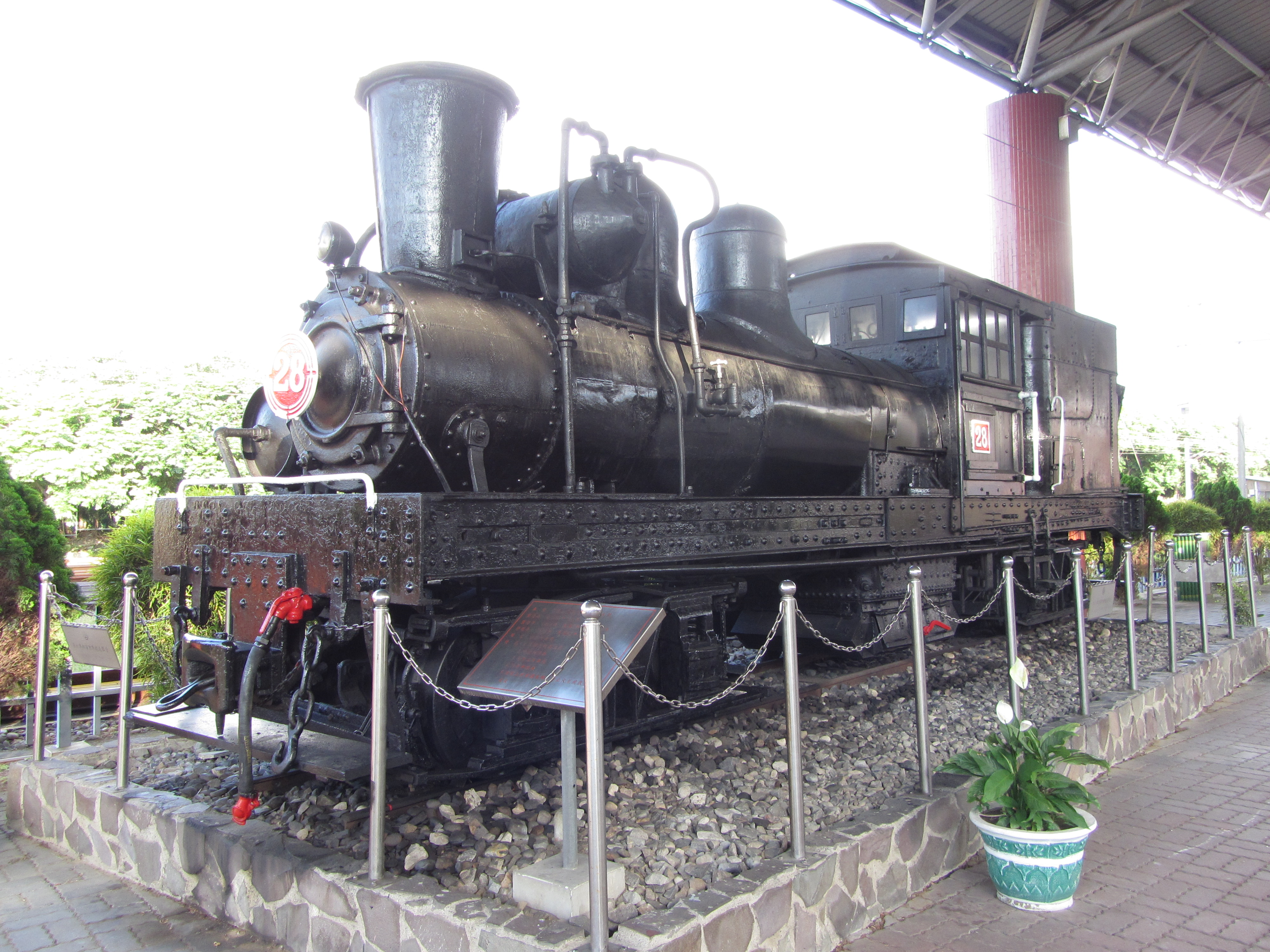
Taiwan Alishan Railway number 28 Shay locomotive

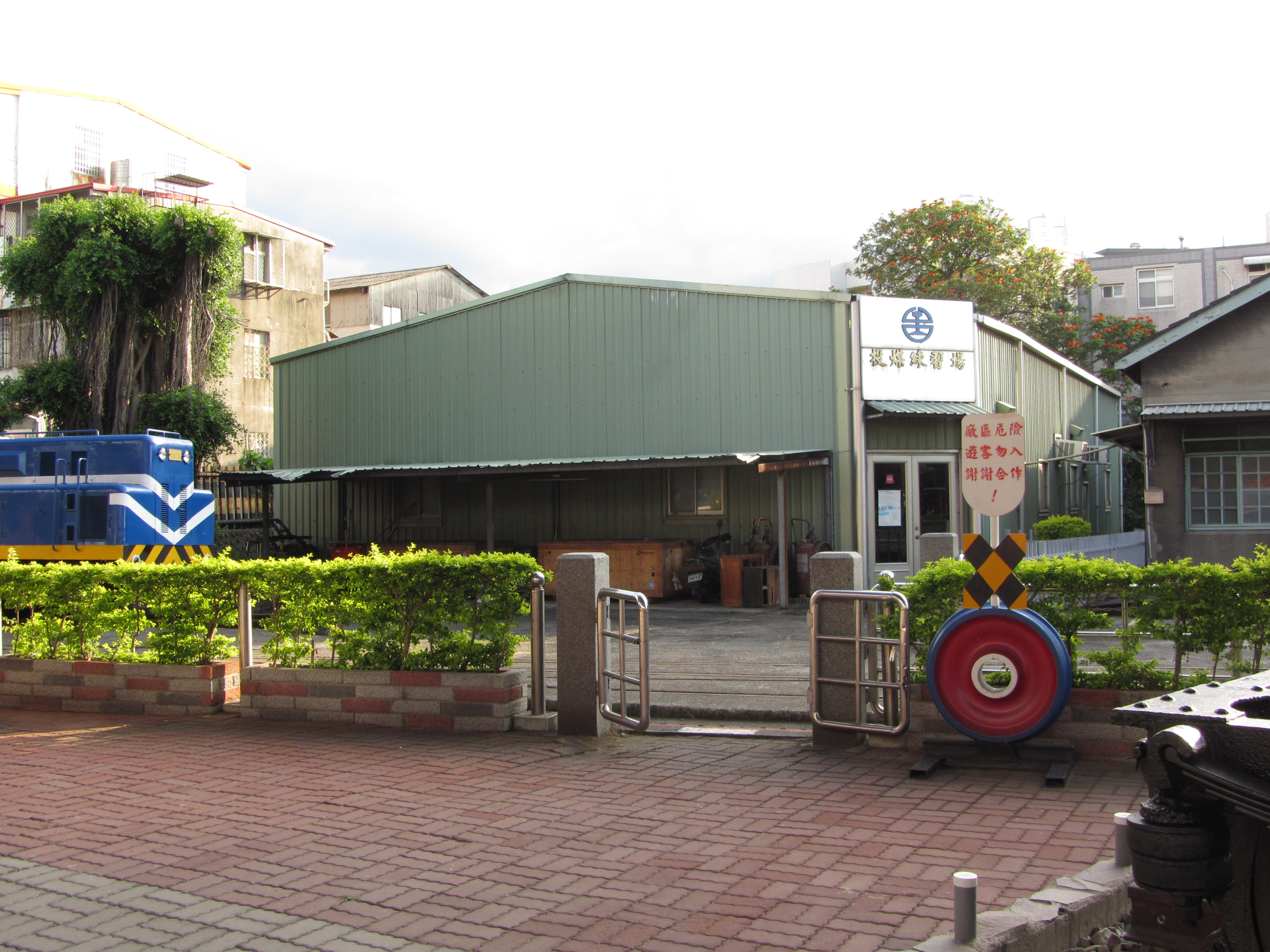
Taiwan Railway Cast coal driving range

== See also ==
- List of museums in Taiwan
