= Miaoli County Urban Planning Exhibition Center =

Gallery in Miaoli County, Miaoli County, Taiwan

- 苗栗縣城市規劃館
- Interactive map of the Miaoli County Urban Planning Exhibition Center area

General information
- Type: gallery
- Location: Miaoli City, Miaoli County, Taiwan
- Coordinates: 24°33′53.3″N 120°49′11.6″E
- Cost: NT$164 million

Technical details
- Floor count: 2

The Miaoli County Urban Planning Exhibition Center (traditional Chinese: 苗栗縣城市規劃館; simplified Chinese: 苗栗县城市规划馆; pinyin: Miáolì Táocí Bówùguǎn) is a gallery of in Miaoli City, Miaoli County, Taiwan about the history of Miaoli County.

== History ==
The building of the center used to be the building for Miaoli County Government before it moved to the building next to the center. The center was constructed with a cost of NT$164 million.

== Architecture ==
The center is housed in a 2-story building.

== Exhibitions ==
The center exhibits the current information and history about Miaoli County which are displayed through imaging technology and scale models.

== Transportation ==
The center is accessible within walking distance south of Miaoli Station of Taiwan Railway.

== See also ==
- List of museums in Taiwan
