= Gongweixu Tunnel =

Former railway tunnel in Taiwan

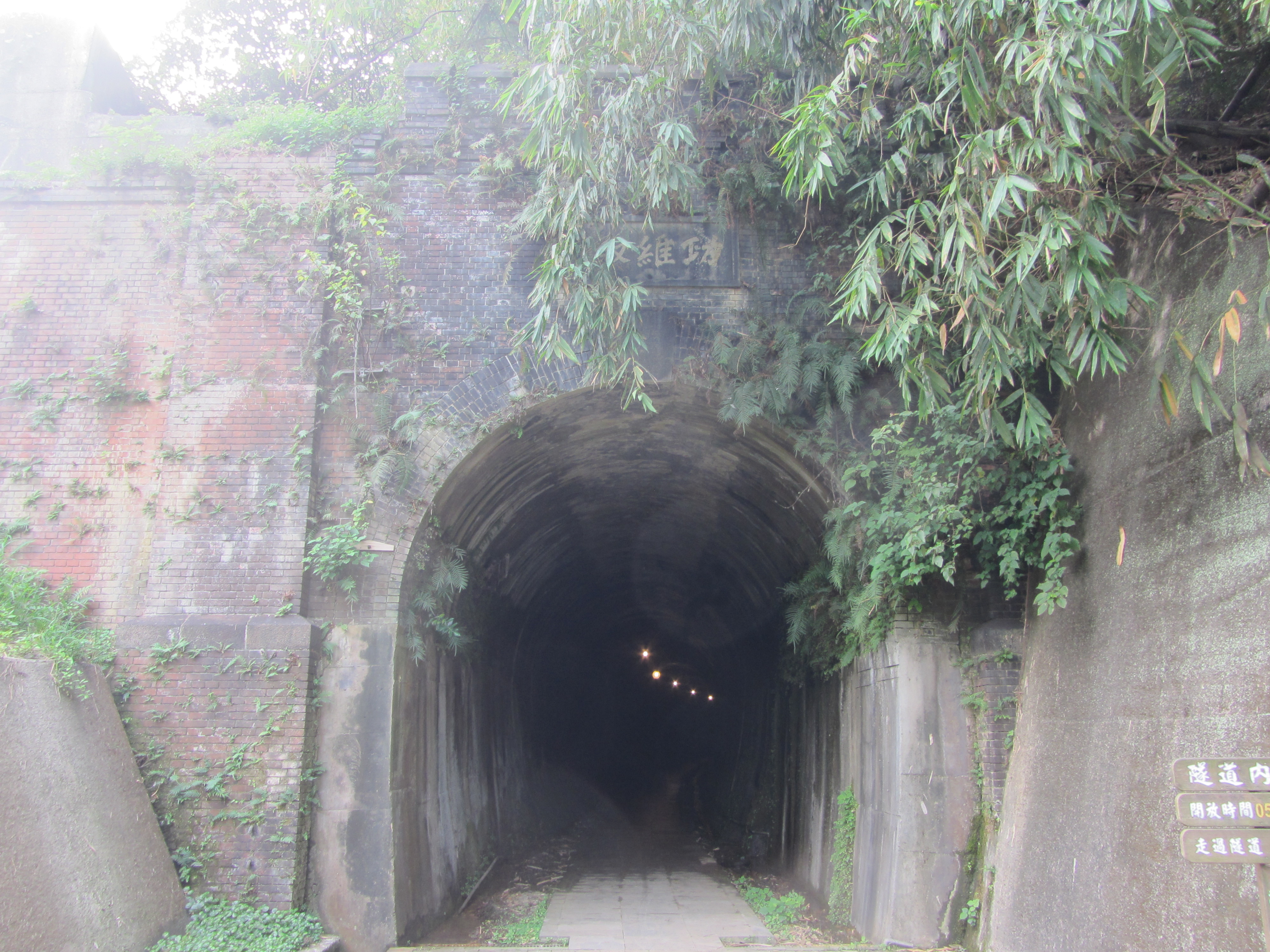
- The north entrance to Gongweixu Tunnel.
- Interactive map of Gongweixu Tunnel

Overview
- Official name: Miaoli Tunnel
- Line: Taichung line
- Location: Miaoli City, Taiwan
- Coordinates: 24.553625°N 120.809125°E
- Status: Converted to pedestrian path

Operation
- Work began: 25 June 1902 (Meiji 35)
- Opened: 31 March 1903 (Meiji 36)
- Closed: 19 September 1998
- Reopened: 2003
- Operator: Taiwan Railway Administration

Technical
- Length: 460 m (1,510 ft)
- Track gauge: 1,067 mm (3 ft 6 in)
- Electrified: Yes

Miaoli Tunnel, commonly known as Gongweixu Tunnel, is a former railway tunnel in Miaoli City, Miaoli County, Taiwan. In 2003, the tunnel was converted into a pedestrian walkway as part of Maolishan Park and is a popular tourist attraction.

== Etymology ==
The official name of the tunnel used by the Taiwan Railway Administration is Miaoli Tunnel (Chinese: 苗栗隧道; pinyin: Miáolì Suìdào). However, the tunnel is more commonly known as "Gongweixu Tunnel" (Chinese: 功維敘隧道; pinyin: Gōngwéixù Suìdào) or simply "Gongweixu". When the tunnel was completed in 1903, then Governor General of Taiwan Kodama Gentarō visited the site and wrote the characters "Gongweixu" on the plaque above the north entrance, hence the alternative name. The source of "Gongweixu" is thought to be the "Counsels of Great Yu" chapter of the Book of Documents.

== History ==
Miaoli Tunnel was constructed between 1902 and 1903 by Taiwan Governor-General Railways during Japan's rule over the island. The 460 m long tunnel was single-tracked and constructed with brick walls. The 1935 Shinchiku-Taichū earthquake dealt significant damage to the earthquake and the tunnel was closed until 1938. In 1993, heavy rain destroyed a corner of the tunnel's north entrance.

The tunnel remained in use until 1998, when a new, double-tracked tunnel named Miaonan Tunnel (苗南隧道) was dug directly to the south. In 2003, the Miaoli City government redeveloped the tunnel into a tourist attraction by turning it into a pedestrian path and illuminating the walls with colorful LED lights. From October 2019 to January 2020, the tunnel was renovated to become wheelchair accessible.

== Layout ==
The north entrance of Gongweixu Tunnel is located in Maolishan Park. At the south entrance, there is a visitor center built out of shipping containers, which has a retired R20 series diesel-electric locomotive (numbered R46) and a passenger car on display. The visitor center also features a bridge built as a replica of the original north entrance.

== Photo gallery ==
North entrance

pedestrian path illuminated by colorful LED lights

pedestrian path illuminated by colorful LED lights
