= Nanshi railway station =

Railway station located in Miaoli, Taiwan

Nanshi Station 南勢車站
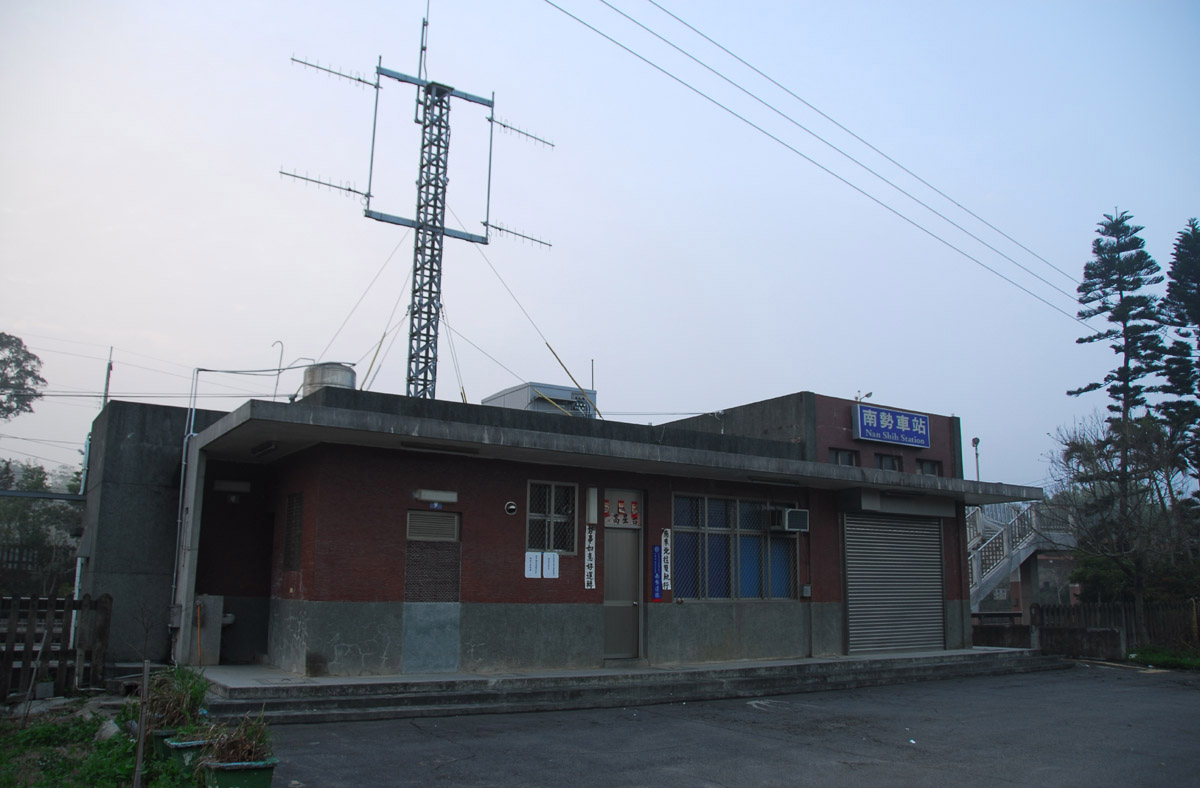

General information
- Location: Miaoli City, Miaoli County, Taiwan
- Coordinates: 24°31′23.42″N 120°47′30.41″E
- Owner: Taiwan Railway Corporation
- Operator: Taiwan Railway Corporation
- Line: West Coast
- Train operators: Taiwan Railway Corporation

History
- Opened: 1 July 1903

Services
Preceding station	Taiwan Railway	Following station
Miaoli towards Keelung	Western Trunk line	Tongluo towards Kaohsiung
Location

Nanshi (Chinese: 南勢車站; Hanyu Pinyin: Nánshì Chēzhàn; Tongyong Pinyin: Nánshìh Chejhàn) is a railway station on the Taiwan Railway West Coast line (Mountain line) located in Miaoli City, Miaoli County, Taiwan.

== History ==
The station was opened on 1 July 1903.

== Around the station ==
- National United University
- Wu Chuo-liu Art and Cultural Hall

== See also ==
- List of railway stations in Taiwan
