= Miaoli =

City in Miaoli County, Taiwan

Coordinates: 24°34′12″N 120°49′12″E

Miaoli 苗栗市
- County-administered city
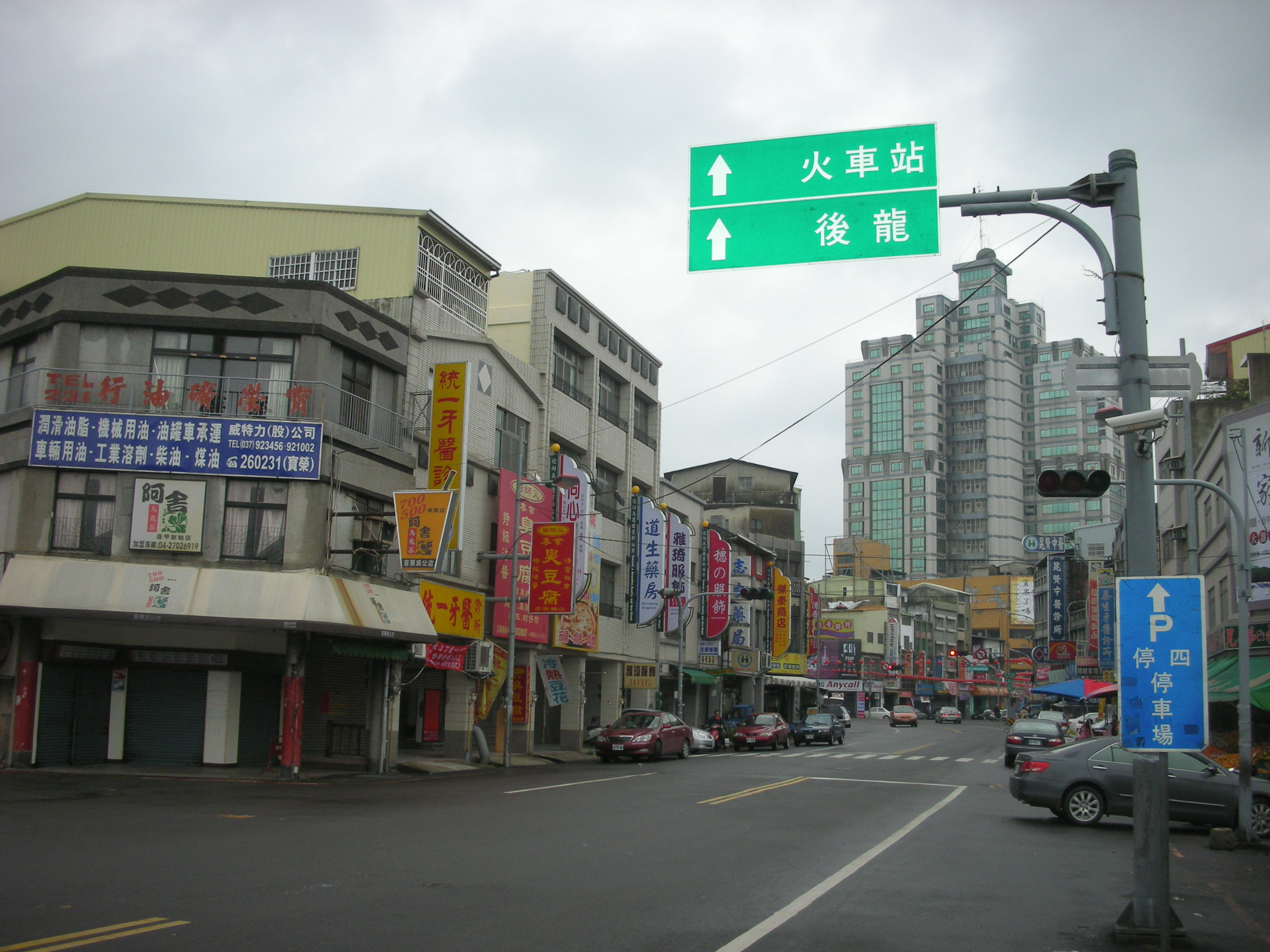

- Seal

- Country: Republic of China (Taiwan)
- Province: Taiwan Province (de facto dormant)
- County: Miaoli

Government
  - Mayor: Yu Wen-chung (余文忠)

Area
  - Total: 37.89 km^{2} (14.63 sq mi)

Population (September 2023)
  - Total: 86,327
  - Density: 2,314/km^{2} (5,990/sq mi)
- Website: www.mlcg.gov.tw (in Chinese)

Miaoli City
- Chinese: 苗栗市
Transcriptions
Standard Mandarin
- Hanyu Pinyin: Miáolì Shì
- Bopomofo: ㄇㄧㄠˊ ㄌㄧˋ ㄕˋ
- Gwoyeu Romatzyh: Miaulih Shyh
- Wade–Giles: Miao^{2}-li^{4} Shih^{4}
- Tongyong Pinyin: Miáolì Shìh
- Yale Romanization: Myáulì Shr̀
- MPS2: Miáulì Shr̀
- IPA: [mjǎʊ.lî ʂɻ̩̂]
Hakka
- Pha̍k-fa-sṳ: Mèu-li̍t-sṳ
Southern Min
- Hokkien POJ: Biâu-le̍k-chhī or Miâu-le̍k-chhī
- Tâi-lô: Biâu-li̍k-tshī or Miâu-li̍k-tshī

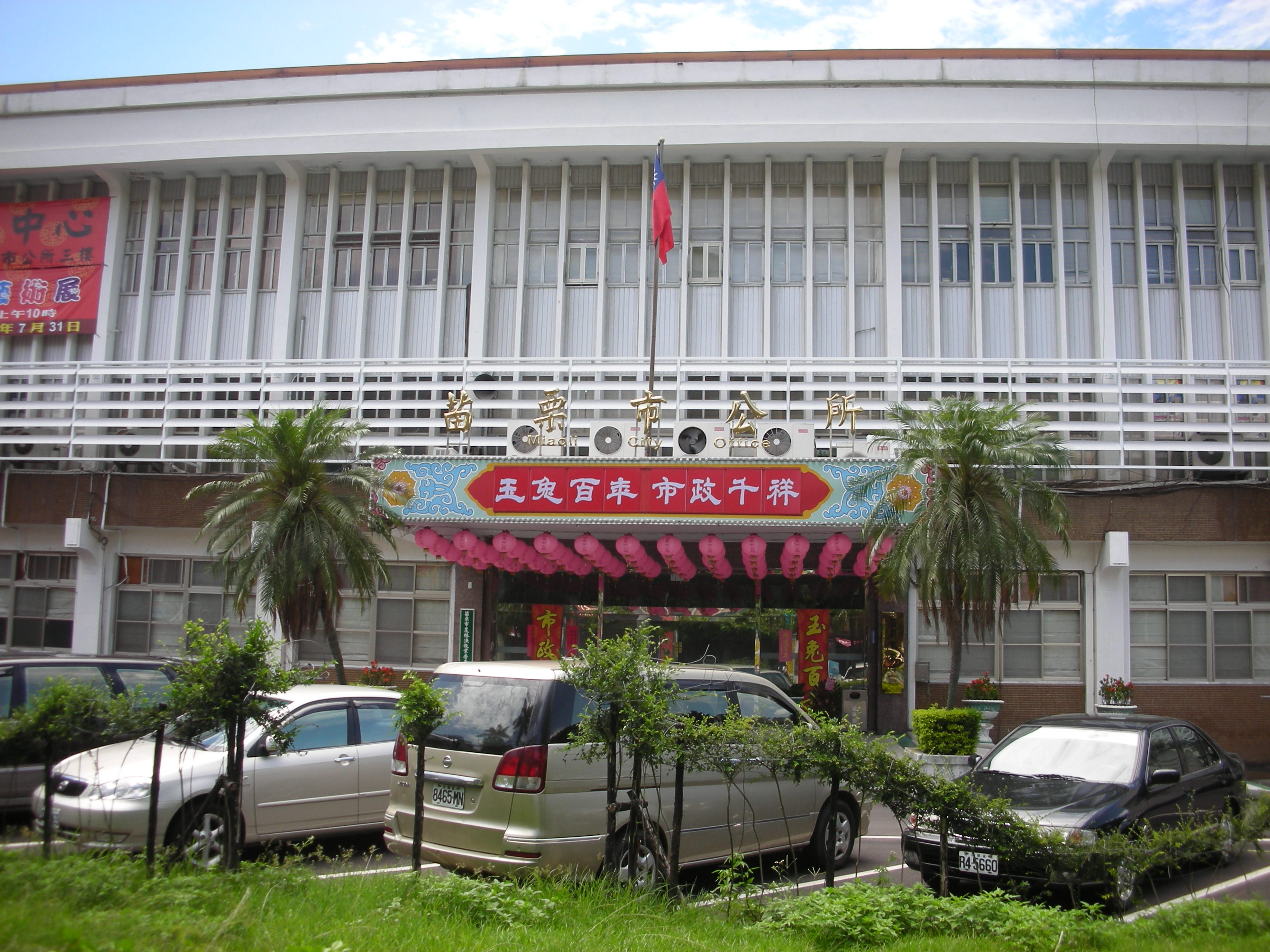
Miaoli City Office

Miaoli City (Wade–Giles: Miao²-li⁴-shih⁴; Hakka PFS: Mèu-li̍t-sṳ; Hokkien POJ: Biâu-le̍k-chhī or Miâu-le̍k-chhī; Japanese Byōritsushi) is a county-administered city and the county seat of Miaoli County, Taiwan. Miaoli has a relatively high percentage of Hakka people. It had the second highest residential price and the highest commercial price for land in Miaoli County as of 2004, at NT$28,601 per square meter and NT$63,317 per square meter, respectively.

== Etymology ==
The name Miaoli was coined using two Hakka syllables, 貓貍, which phonetically approximate Pali (Bari) from the Taokas language.

== History ==
=== Empire of Japan ===
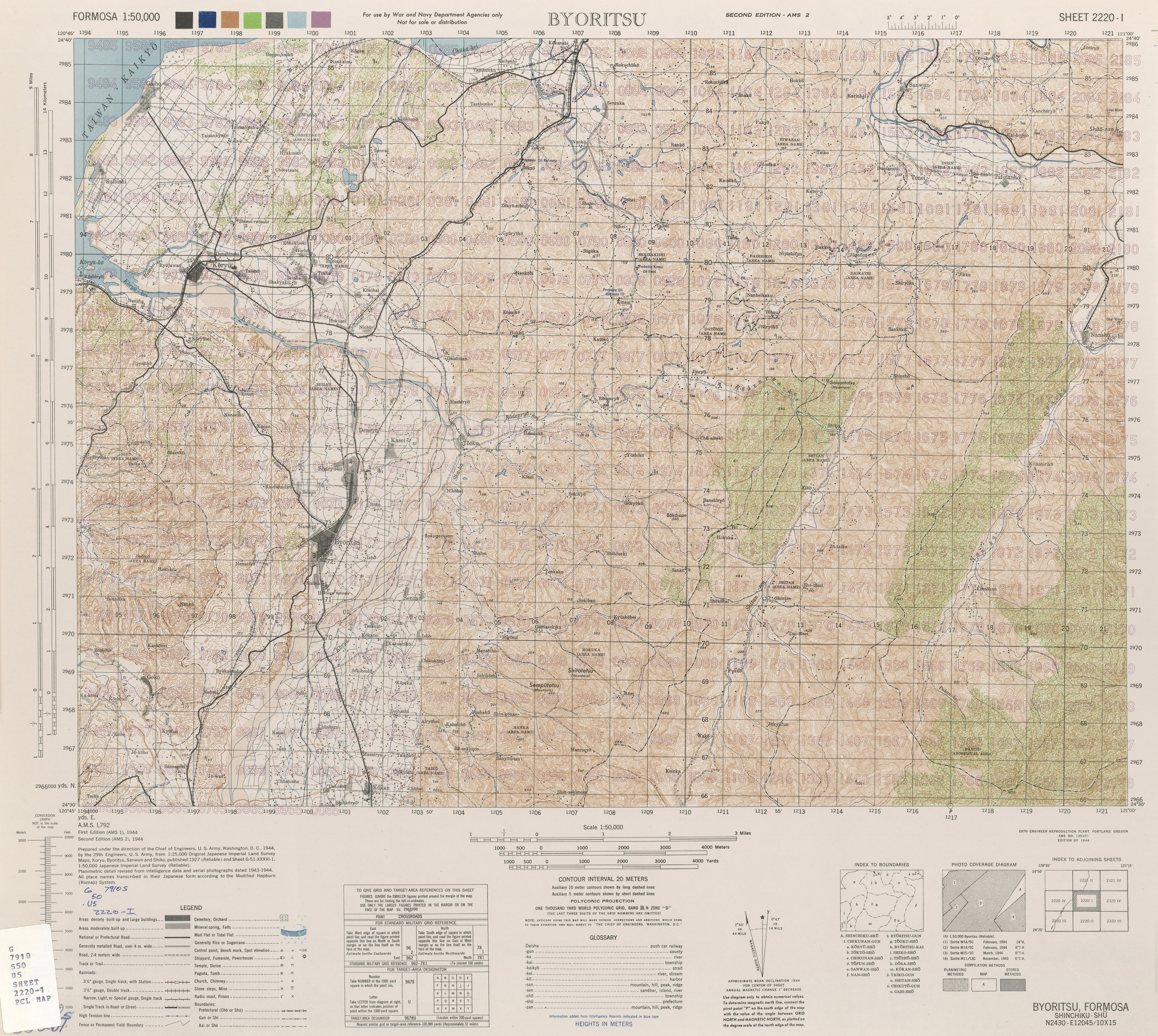
Map of Miaoli (labeled as Byōritsu) and surrounding areas (1944)

Miaoli Hsien was at first eliminated under Japanese rule. Bioritsu Cho (苗栗廳, Byōritsu Chō) was established in 1901. It was then divided over Shinchiku Chō (新竹廳) and Taichū Chō (臺中廳) in 1909. From 1920 to 1945, Byōritsu Town (苗栗街), Enri Town (苑裡街) and six villages were under the jurisdiction of Byōritsu District (苗栗郡), under Shinchiku Prefecture.

=== Republic of China ===
On 16 August 1950, Miaoli City (then Miaoli Township) was designed as the county seat of the newly established Miaoli County. On 25 December 1981, Miaoli Township was upgraded from urban township to a county-administered city as Miaoli City.

== Population ==
As of September 2023, the population of Miaoli City was estimated at 86,327.

== Administrative divisions ==
Villages in Miaoli City

The city is administered as 28 villages: Beimiao, Datong, Fuan, Fuli, Fuxing, Gaomiao, Gongjing, Jiacheng, Jiangong, Jiaxin, Jingmiao, Lumiao, Nanshi, Qinghua, Shangmiao, Shengli, Shuiyuan, Weixiang, Weixin, Wenshan, Wensheng, Xinchuan, Xinmiao, Xinying, Yuhua, Yumiao, Yuqing and Zhongmiao.

== Government institutions ==
- Miaoli County Government
- Miaoli County Council

== Education ==
- National United University

== Tourist attractions ==
- Chiou Chang-hai Commemorative Monument
- Gongweixu Tunnel
- Lai's Chastity Stone Arch
- Martyr's Commemorative Tower
- Miaoli County Urban Planning Exhibition Center
- Miaoli Craft Park
- Miaoli Mountain Park
- Miaoli Railway Museum
- Miaoli Wenchang Temple
- Thinking Mother Pavilion
- Yuqing Temple

== Transportation ==
Notable bridge in the city is Xindong Bridge.

=== Rail ===
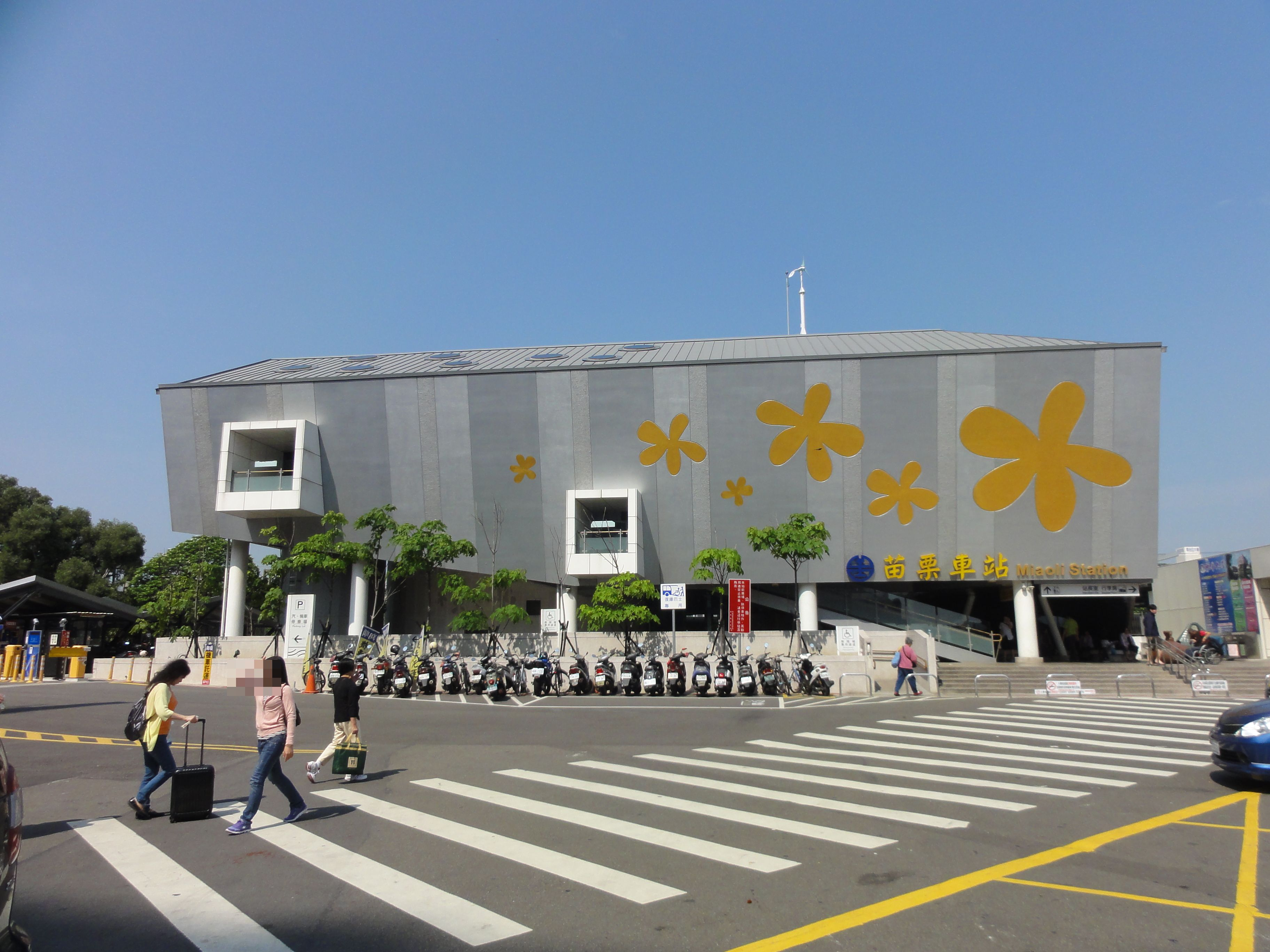
Miaoli Station

- Taiwan Railway Miaoli Station
- Taiwan Railway Nanshi Station

Taiwan High Speed Rail cuts through a part of the city, but no station is currently planned.

=== Bus ===
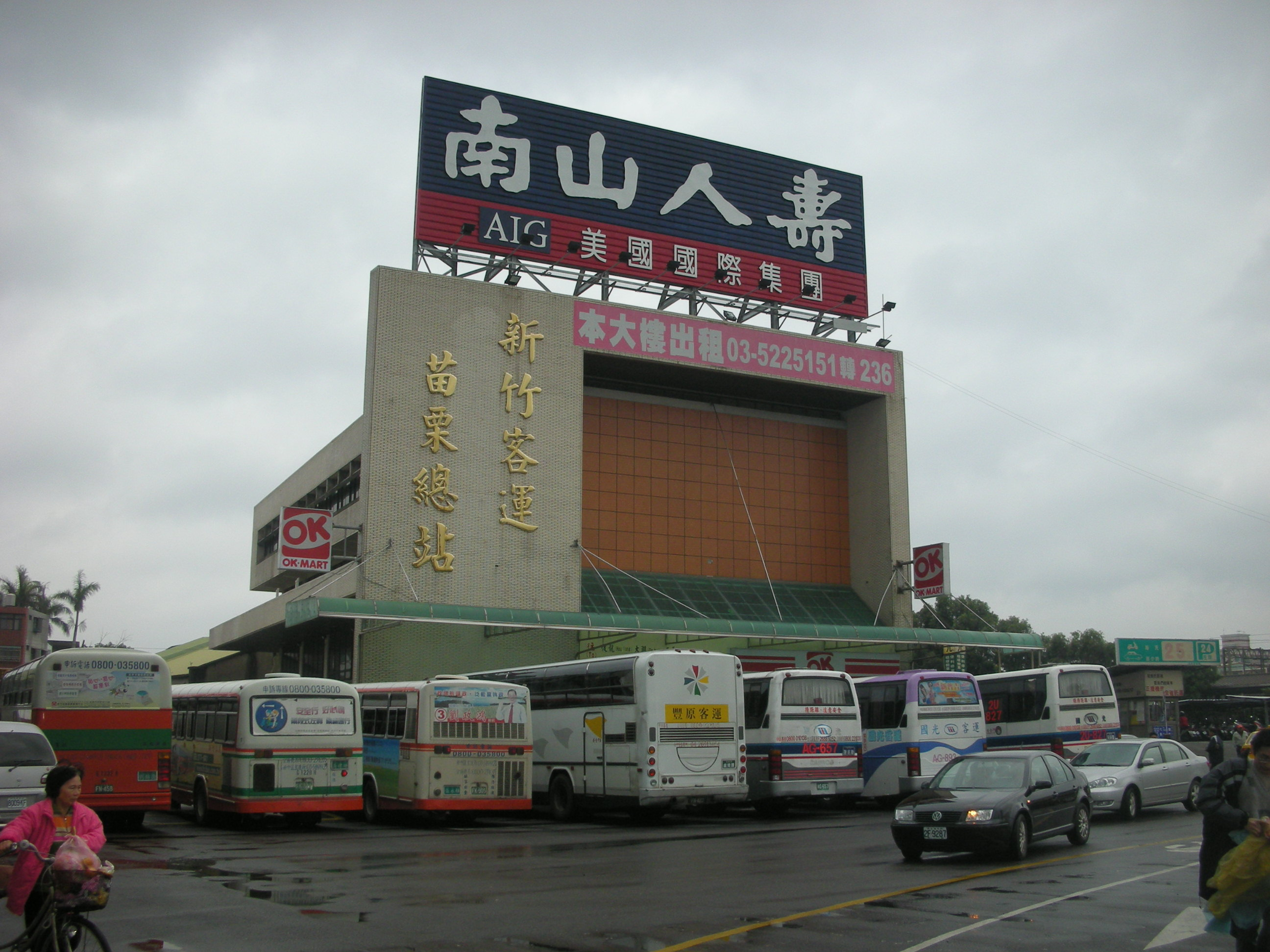
Miaoli Bus Station

Bus services are operated by Miaoli Bus, Hsinchu Bus, and Kuo-Kuang Bus.

== Sister city relations ==
- - Shimizu, Shizuoka Prefecture, Japan.

== Climate ==
Climate data for Miaoli City (2012–2023 normals, extremes 2012–present)
Month	Jan	Feb	Mar	Apr	May	Jun	Jul	Aug	Sep	Oct	Nov	Dec	Year
Record high °C (°F)	29.5 (85.1)	32.8 (91.0)	32.3 (90.1)	33.8 (92.8)	36.0 (96.8)	36.2 (97.2)	38.8 (101.8)	38.4 (101.1)	37.0 (98.6)	36.8 (98.2)	32.6 (90.7)	30.2 (86.4)	38.8 (101.8)
Mean daily maximum °C (°F)	19.9 (67.8)	20.0 (68.0)	23.1 (73.6)	26.8 (80.2)	30.0 (86.0)	32.4 (90.3)	33.8 (92.8)	33.1 (91.6)	32.1 (89.8)	29.1 (84.4)	26.2 (79.2)	21.4 (70.5)	27.3 (81.2)
Daily mean °C (°F)	16.1 (61.0)	16.1 (61.0)	18.9 (66.0)	22.7 (72.9)	26.3 (79.3)	28.9 (84.0)	29.9 (85.8)	29.2 (84.6)	28.1 (82.6)	25.0 (77.0)	22.1 (71.8)	17.7 (63.9)	23.4 (74.2)
Mean daily minimum °C (°F)	13.3 (55.9)	13.4 (56.1)	15.6 (60.1)	19.5 (67.1)	23.3 (73.9)	26.2 (79.2)	26.9 (80.4)	26.3 (79.3)	25.0 (77.0)	22.0 (71.6)	19.1 (66.4)	14.9 (58.8)	20.5 (68.8)
Record low °C (°F)	2.8 (37.0)	6.3 (43.3)	8.3 (46.9)	10.9 (51.6)	14.9 (58.8)	21.8 (71.2)	22.4 (72.3)	23.7 (74.7)	20.3 (68.5)	14.8 (58.6)	8.0 (46.4)	6.8 (44.2)	2.8 (37.0)
Average precipitation mm (inches)	71.9 (2.83)	76.1 (3.00)	136.3 (5.37)	157.7 (6.21)	314.8 (12.39)	238.6 (9.39)	134.8 (5.31)	292.8 (11.53)	99.4 (3.91)	29.4 (1.16)	41.0 (1.61)	58.8 (2.31)	1,651.6 (65.02)
Average precipitation days	7.3	8.1	10.8	10.3	11.8	10.5	8.2	12.3	6.6	3.7	5.5	6.9	102
Average relative humidity (%)	79.0	81.5	79.5	77.0	77.8	74.1	70.9	74.4	73.6	72.3	76.6	76.6	76.1
Source 1: Central Weather Administration
Source 2: Atmospheric Science Research and Application Databank (precipitation 2012–2023, precipitation days and humidity 2011–2024)
