= National United University =

University in Miaoli County, Taiwan

Coordinates: 24°32′18.2″N 120°47′22.5″E

- 國立聯合大學 (Chinese)
- Motto: 誠、敬、勤、新
- Motto in English: Honesty, Respect, Diligence and Creativity
- Type: Public
- Established: September 1972
- President: Dr. Ming-Hsi Hsu
- Academic staff: 282
- Students: 7,269
- Undergraduates: 5,758
- Postgraduates: 231
- Location: Miaoli, Miaoli County, Taiwan
- Campus: Urban and Suburban
- Website: www.nuu.edu.tw

Chinese name
- Simplified Chinese: 国立联合大学
- Traditional Chinese: 國立聯合大學
Transcriptions
Standard Mandarin
- Hanyu Pinyin: Guólì Liánhé Dàxué
Hakka
- Pha̍k-fa-sṳ: Kwet-li̍p Lîen-ha̍p Thài-ho̍k
Southern Min
- Hokkien POJ: Kok-li̍p Liân-ha̍p Tāi-ha̍k

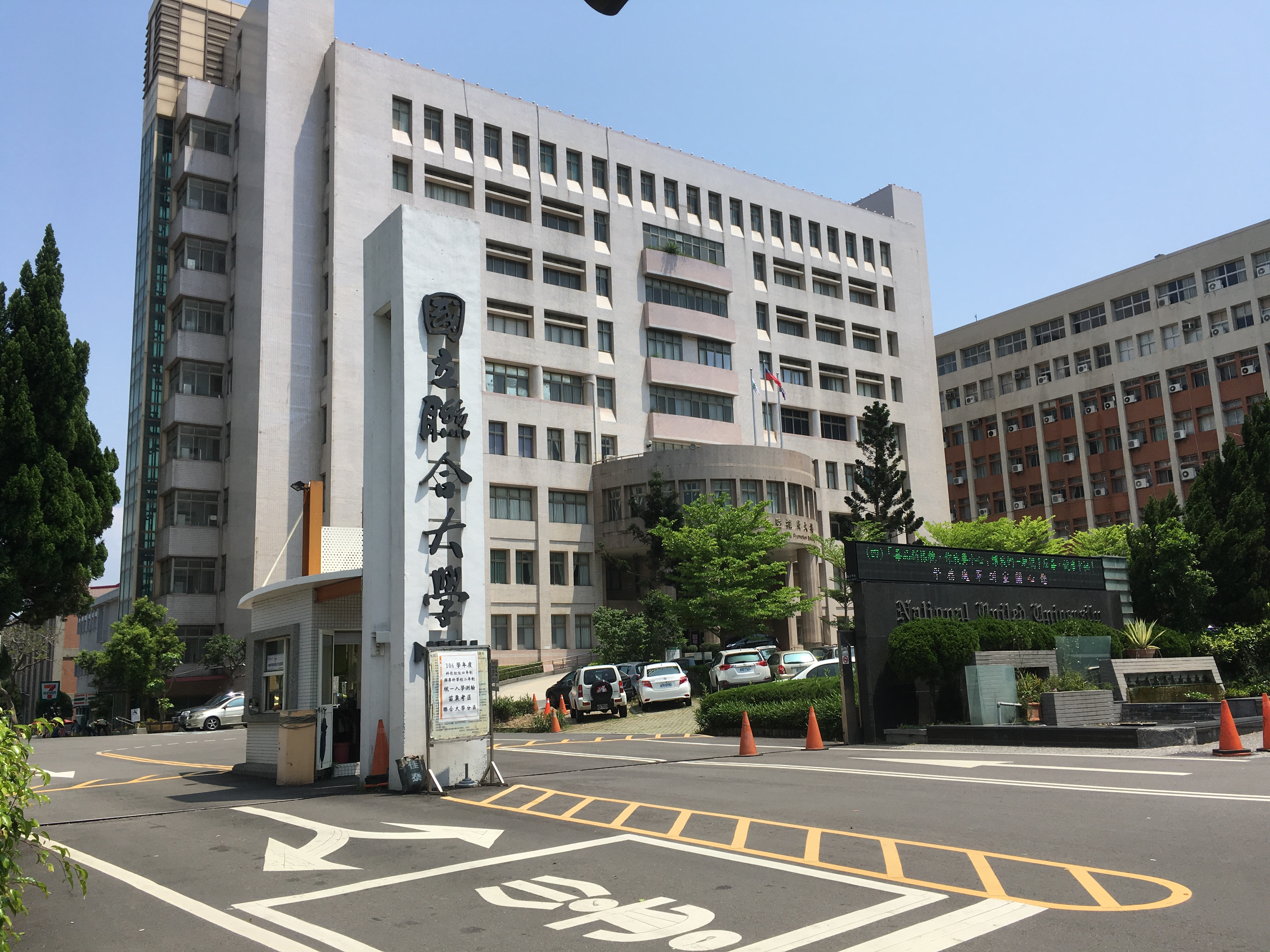
National United University

The National United University (NUU; Chinese: 國立聯合大學; Pha̍k-fa-sṳ: Kwet-li̍p Lîen-ha̍p Thài-ho̍k) is a public university in Miaoli City, Miaoli County, Taiwan.

NUU offers undergraduate and graduate programs in a wide range of fields, including business, engineering, humanities, law, science, and social sciences.

NUU has several research centers and institutes, such as the Institute of Law and Intellectual Property, the Institute of International Management, and the Research Center for Sustainable Energy and Environment.

== History ==
The school (then a two-year private junior college) started its first semester in September 1972 as Lien Ho Industrial and Technological Junior College. The college was the only higher education institution in the Miaoli region at the time. On 1 August 1973, it was renamed to Lien Ho Junior College of Technology.

In 1992 the college was renamed Lien Ho College of Technology and Commerce. On July 1, 1995, the Board of Directors donated the school to the Ministry of Education, and the college became a public institution named the National Lien Ho College of Technology and Commerce. In 1999, the College was reorganized into an institute of technology as National Lien Ho Institute of Technology. On August 1, 2003, the institute was upgraded to a university status as National United University.

== Academics ==
National United University rankings

Regional – Overall
- QS Asia: 801-850 (2025)

There are five academic programs at National United University:

- College of Engineering Science
- College of Electrical Engineering and Computer Science
- College of Management
- College of Humanities and Social Science
- College of Hakka Studies

== Transportation ==
The university is accessible within walking distance North of Miaoli Station or Nanshi Station of Taiwan Railway.

== See also ==
- List of universities in Taiwan
