= Miaoli County Government =

Government of Miaoli County, Taiwan

Coordinates: 24.5649°N 120.8207°E

- 苗栗縣政府
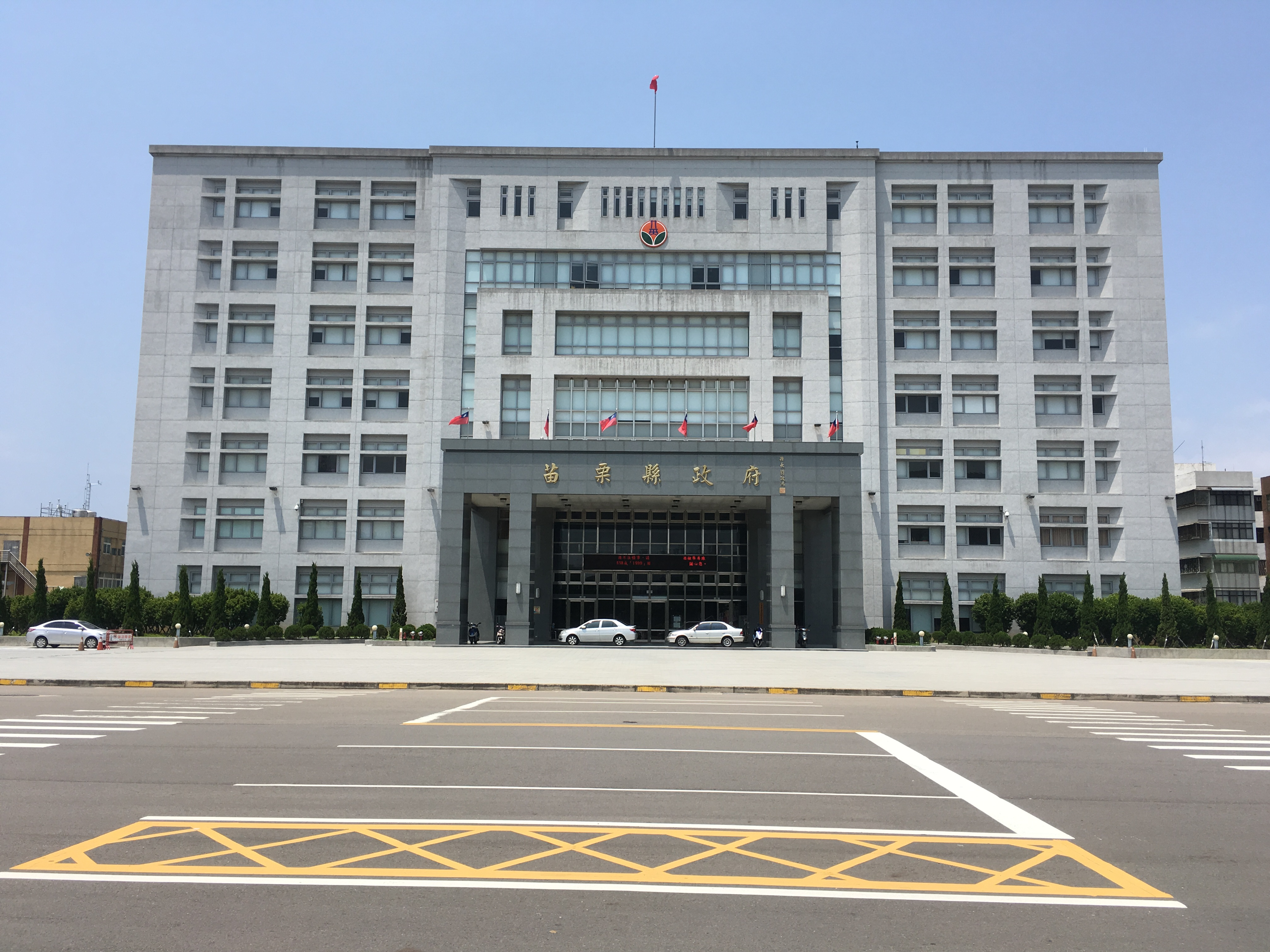
- Miaoli County Hall

Agency overview
- Jurisdiction: Miaoli County
- Headquarters: Miaoli City
- Agency executive: Chung Tung-chin, Magistrate
- Website: Official website

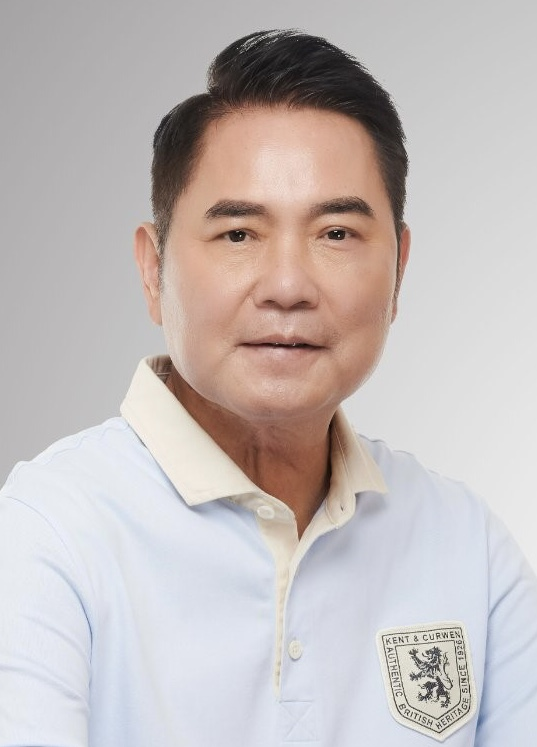
Chung Tung-chin, the incumbent Magistrate of Miaoli County

The Miaoli County Government (traditional Chinese: 苗栗縣政府; simplified Chinese: 苗栗县政府; pinyin: Miáolì Xiàn Zhèngfǔ) is the local government of Miaoli County, Taiwan.

== History ==
The county government used to be housed in a building next to the current building which is now used as the Miaoli County Urban Planning Exhibition Center.

== Organization ==
- County Executive
- Deputy County Executive
- County Administration Meeting
- Secretary-General
- Executive Officer or Secretary

=== Departments ===
- Civil Affairs Department
- Finance Department
- Water Resources and City Development Department
- Public Works Department
- Education Department
- Labor Affairs and Social Resources Department
- Agriculture Department
- Land Administration Department
- Economic Development Department
- Indigenous Affairs Department
- General Affairs Department
- Planning Department
- Accounting and Statistics Department
- Personnel Department
- Civil Service Ethics Department

=== Bureaus ===
- Police Bureau
- Fire Bureau
- Public Health Bureau
- International Culture and Tourism Bureau
- Local Tax Bureau
- Environmental Protection Bureau

== See also ==
- Miaoli County Council
