= Miaoli County Constituency 2 =

Constituency of the Legislative Yuan of Taiwan

- Single-member constituency for the Legislative Yuan
- District(s): Miaoli City, Toufen City, Dahu, Gongguan, Nanzhuang, Sanwan, Shitan, Touwu, Tai'an, Zhuolan
- Electorate: 231,863 (2024 election)

Current constituency
- Created: 2008
- Party: KMT
- Member: Chiu Chen-chun

Miaoli County Constituency 2 (Chinese: 苗栗縣第二選舉區) is one of the 73 regional constituencies represented in the Legislative Yuan, the national legislature of Taiwan. It was created in 2008 following a series of constitutional reforms, and elects one legislator, through first-past-the-post voting, to the Legislative Yuan. It has been represented by Chiu Chen-chun of the Kuomintang since 2024.

== Legislators ==
Election	Legislator	Party
2008 - 2015	Hsu Yao-chang	Kuomintang
2015 - 2024	Hsu Chih-jung	Kuomintang
2024	Chiu Chen-chun	Kuomintang

== Election results ==

=== 2008 ===
2008 Taiwanese legislative election: Miaoli County 2
Candidate	Party	Votes	%
Hsu Yao-chang	Kuomintang	57,880	45.63
Ho Chih-hui	Kuomintang	48,290	38.07
Chan Yun-hsi	Democratic Progressive Party	18,905	14.90
Kuo Yu-chih	Hakka Party	975	0.77
Chuang Yen	Democratic Liberal Party	474	0.37
Lai Chin-ming	Great Compassionate Salvation Party	335	0.26
Total		126,859	100.00
Valid votes		126,859	98.37
Invalid/blank votes		2,107	1.63
Total votes		128,966	100.00
Registered voters/turnout		216,025	59.70
Majority		9,590	7.56
Kuomintang win (new seat)			

=== 2012 ===
* denotes the incumbent legislator

2012 Taiwanese legislative election: Miaoli County 2
Candidate	Party	Votes	%	+/–
Hsu Yao-chang*	Kuomintang	118,858	71.65	▼12.05
Yiong Con-ziin	Democratic Progressive Party	47,022	28.35	▲13.45
Total		165,880	100.00	–
Valid votes		165,880	98.12	
Invalid/blank votes		3,172	1.88	
Total votes		169,052	100.00	
Registered voters/turnout		224,923	75.16	
Majority		71,836	43.3	
Kuomintang hold				

=== 2015 by-election ===
2015 Taiwanese legislative by-elections: Miaoli County 2
Candidate	Party	Votes	%	+/–
Hsu Chih-jung	Kuomintang	47,105	58.21	▼13.44
Wu Yi-chen	Democratic Progressive Party	32,966	40.74	▲12.39
Chen Shu-fen	Independent	851	1.05	NEW
Total		80,922	100.00	–
Valid votes		80,922	99.38	
Invalid/blank votes		508	0.62	
Total votes		81,430	100.00	
Registered voters/turnout		231,684	35.15	
Majority		14,139	17.47	
Kuomintang hold				

=== 2016 ===
* denotes the incumbent legislator

2016 Taiwanese legislative election: Miaoli County 2
Candidate	Party	Votes	%	+/–
Hsu Chih-jung*	Kuomintang	73,234	49.90	▼8.31
Wu Yi-chen	Democratic Progressive Party	65,465	44.61	▲3.87
Chou Shu-han	Independent	4,468	3.04	NEW
Tai Wen-hsiang	Independent	3,076	2.10	NEW
Liu Wen-chung	Free Taiwan Party	518	0.35	NEW
Total		146,761	100.00	–
Valid votes		146,761	98.35	
Invalid/blank votes		2,457	1.65	
Total votes		149,218	100.00	
Registered voters/turnout		232,151	64.28	
Majority		7,769	5.29	
Kuomintang hold				

=== 2020 ===
* denotes the incumbent legislator

2020 Taiwanese legislative election: Miaoli County 2
Candidate	Party	Votes	%	+/–
Hsu Chih-jung*	Kuomintang	91,144	54.13	▲4.23
Hsu Ting-chen	Democratic Progressive Party	50,629	30.07	▼14.54
Wen Chun-yung	Independent	19,418	11.53	NEW
Tseng Wan-ching	Chinese Unification Promotion Party	2,803	1.66	NEW
Lin yu-tung	Taiwan Statebuilding Party	2,694	1.60	NEW
Lin Ming-che	Labor Party	1,706	1.01	NEW
Total		168,394	100.00	–
Valid votes		168,394	98.05	
Invalid/blank votes		3,348	1.95	
Total votes		171,742	100.00	
Registered voters/turnout		231,819	74.08	
Majority		40,515	24.06	
Kuomintang hold				

=== 2024 ===
2024 Taiwanese legislative election: Miaoli County 2
Candidate	Party	Votes	%	+/–
Chiu Chen-chun	Kuomintang	89,111	55.05	▲0.92
Tseng Wen-hsueh	Independent (Note: Endorsed by the Democratic Progressive Party)	72,749	44.95	NEW
Total		161,860	100.00	–
Valid votes		161,860	96.87	
Invalid/blank votes		5,225	3.13	
Total votes		167,085	100.00	
Registered voters/turnout		231,863	72.06	
Majority		16,362	10.1	
Kuomintang hold				
