= Legislative Yuan constituencies in Miaoli County =

Miaoli County
- 2 Single-member constituency for the Legislative Yuan
- District(s): Miaoli County
- Electorate: 437,721 (2024 election)

Current constituency
- Created: 2008
- Number of members: 2

Miaoli County legislative districts (Chinese: 苗栗縣選舉區; pinyin: Miáolì Xiàn Xuǎnjǔ Qū) consist of 2 single-member constituencies, each represented by a member of the Republic of China Legislative Yuan.

== Current districts ==
- Miaoli County Constituency 1 - Houlong, Sanyi, Tongluo, Tongxiao, Yuanli, Zaoqiao, Zhunan Townships
- Miaoli County Constituency 2 - Miaoli City, Toufen City, Dahu, Gongguan, Nanzhuang, Sanwan, Shitan, Touwu, Tai'an, Zhuolan Townships
Miaoli County Constituency 1

Miaoli County Constituency 2

== Legislators ==
Kuomintang Independent

Election	Miaoli County 1	Miaoli County 2
2008 7th	Lee Yi-ting (2008)^{1}	Hsu Yao-chang (2008-2014)^{2}
2008 by-election	Kang Shih-ju (2008-2012)	Hsu Yao-chang (2008-2014)^{2}
2012 8th	Chen Chao-ming	Hsu Yao-chang (2008-2014)^{2}
2014 by-election	Chen Chao-ming	Hsu Chih-jung
2016 9th	Chen Chao-ming	Hsu Chih-jung
2020 10th	Chen Chao-ming	Hsu Chih-jung
2024 11th	Chen Chao-ming	Chiu Chen-chun

Li Yi-ting was removed from office due to election fraud.

Hsu Yao-chang resigned in 2014 after his election as Miaoli County magistrate.
