= Tongluo (disambiguation) =

Tongluo is a rural township in Miaoli County, Taiwan.

Tongluo may also refer to:

- Tongluo people (同羅)
- Tongluo railway station, a railway station on the Taiwan Railways Administration Taichung line
- Tongluo Town (铜锣镇), Changning County, Sichuan Province, China
- Tongluo tribe (同羅部), List of dynasties#China
- Tongluo Village (铜锣村), Gantian, Zhuzhou, Hunan Province, China
- Tongluo Village (铜锣村), Huashi, Xiangtan, Hunan Province, China
- Tongluo Village (铜锣村), Longsheng Various Nationalities Autonomous County, Guangxi, China
- Tongluo Village (銅鑼村), Tongluo, Miaoli County, Taiwan

== See also ==
- Tung Lo Wan (disambiguation)
