= Provincial Highway 72 (Taiwan) =

Road in Taiwan

Provincial Highway 72
- 台72線
- 東西向快速公路後龍汶水線 (East-West Expressway, Houlong-Wenshui Line)
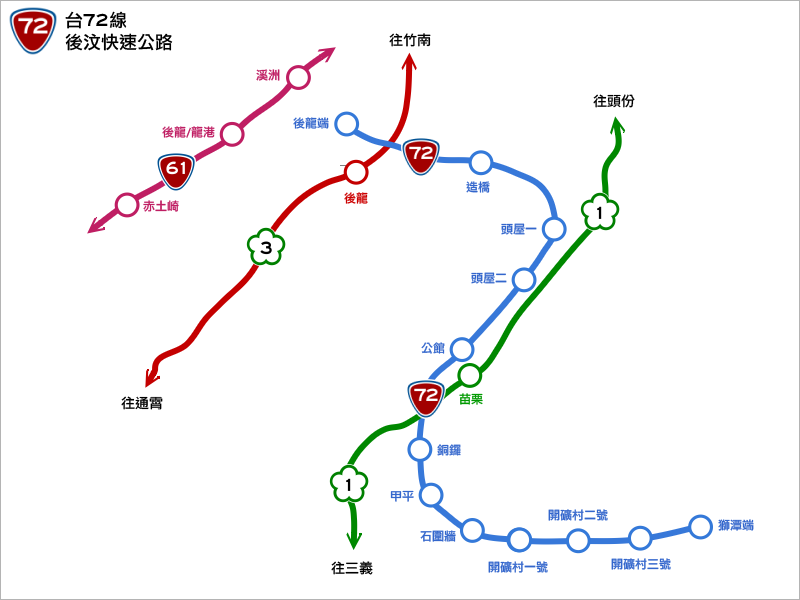

Route information
- Maintained by Directorate General of Highways
- Length: 28.6 km (17.8 mi)
- Existed: January 2001–present

Major junctions
- West end: Prov 1 in Houlong, Miaoli
- East end: Prov 3 in Shitan, Miaoli

Location
- Country: Taiwan

Highway system
- Highway system in Taiwan
| ← Prov 68 | → Prov 74 |

Provincial Highway 72 (Chinese: 台72線) is an expressway, which begins in Houlong, Miaoli on Guanghua Road (Provincial Highway No. 1) and ends in Shitan, Miaoli on the Provincial Highway No. 3.

== Length ==
The total length is 28 km (17.4 mi).

== Exit list ==
| City | Location | km | Mile | Exit | Name | Destinations | Notes |
|---|---|---|---|---|---|---|---|
| Miaoli County | Houlong | 2.4 | 1.5 | 2 | Houlong | Prov 1 to Prov 6 – Xihu, Houlong | |
| Miaoli County | Houlong | 5.2 | 3.2 | 5 | Xingang | Houlong | Westbound Exit and Eastbound Entrance |
| Miaoli County | Houlong | 6.7 | 4.2 | 6 | Zaoqiao | Prov 13a – Zaoqiao, Miaoli City | |
| Miaoli County | Touwu | 10.1 | 6.3 | 10 | Touwu 1 | Prov 13 to Nat 1 – Touwu, Miaoli City | |
| Miaoli County | Touwu | 12.8 | 8.0 | 12 | Touwu 2 | Miaoli County Government | |
| Miaoli County | Gongguan | 15.8 | 9.8 | 15 | Gongguan | Prov 6 – Gongguan, Miaoli City | |
| Miaoli County | Tongluo | 20.8 | 12.9 | 20 | Tongluo | Cty 128 to Nat 1 – Gongguan, Tongluo | East end of freeway |
| Miaoli County | Shitan | 31 | 19 | 31 | Shitan | Prov 3 | |
1.000 mi = 1.609 km; 1.000 km = 0.621 mi: Incomplete access

== Major Cities Along the Route ==
- Miaoli City

== Intersections with other Freeways and Expressways ==
No direct connections. However, Houlong IC of National Highway No. 3 and Touwu IC. and Miaoli IC of National Highway No. 1 are close to this expressway.

== See also ==
- Highway system in Taiwan

== Notes ==
Tongluo IC - Shitan End completed on January 29, 2005.

There is a 2 km planned route west of the Provincial Highway No. 1. Its construction is postponed indefinitely.

A trial program to allow a motorcycle with a cylinder capacity of more than 250 cm^{3} or with an electric power of more than 40 horsepowers was started in January 2005 for one year. This trial program was extended for one year.
