= Asia-Pacific Institute of Creativity =

College in Toufen, Miaoli County, Taiwan

- 亞太創意技術學院
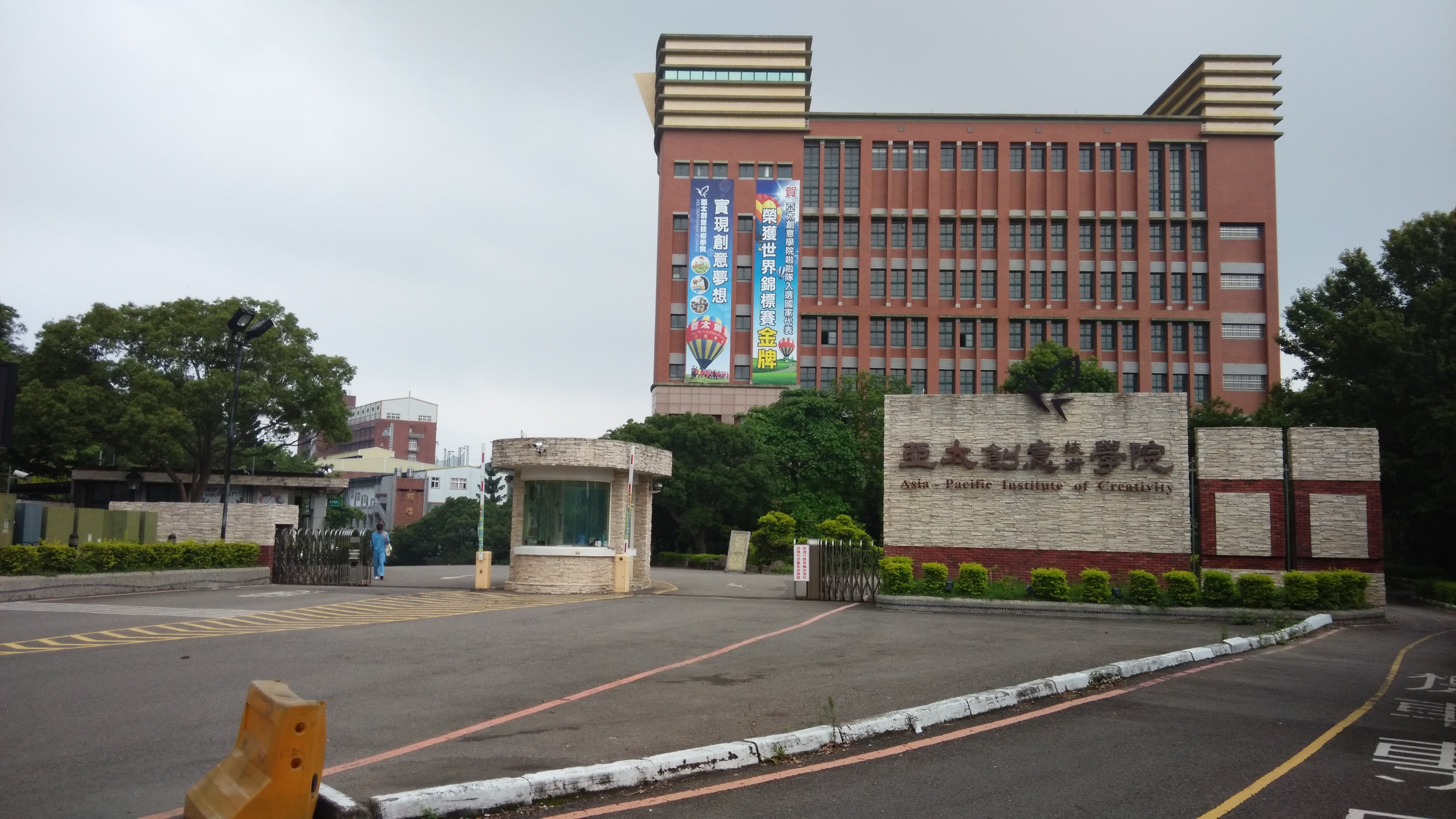
- Former names: Chin-Min College; Chin-Min Institute of Technology
- Type: Private
- Active: 1985 (as Chin-Min College); 1993 (as APIC)–2019
- Location: Toufen, Miaoli County, Taiwan; 24°40′58.6″N 120°58′12.84″E

Asia-Pacific Institute of Creativity
- Traditional Chinese: 亞太創意技術學院
Transcriptions
Standard Mandarin
- Hanyu Pinyin: Yàtài Chuàngyì Jìshù Xuéyuàn
Southern Min
- Hokkien POJ: A-thài Chhòng-ì Ki-su̍t Ha̍k-īⁿ

Asia-Pacific Institute of Creativity (APIC; traditional Chinese: 亞太創意技術學院; simplified Chinese: 亚太创意技术学院; Pe̍h-ōe-jī: A-thài Chhòng-ì Ki-su̍t Ha̍k-īⁿ) was an educational college located in Toufen City, Miaoli County, Taiwan.

APIC offers a variety of undergraduate and graduate programs in creative fields. These include Bachelor's degrees in Visual Communication Design, Fashion Design, Digital Media Design, and 3D Animation, as well as Master's degrees in Design Strategy and Innovation, and Digital Entertainment and Game Design.

== History ==
The school was originally founded as Chin-Min College in 1985. In 1992, it was renamed to Chin-Min Institute of Technology. Finally in 2010, the school was named as Asia-Pacific Institute of Creativity.

By the end of 2016, the school submitted a proposal to the Ministry of Education to revamp the school system but was rejected. In March 2017, the ministry requested the school to submit a proposal on how they shall improve the school curriculum, academic staffs quality and increase the number of student intakes by 28 April 2017. The school was eventually closed down in 2019.

== Faculties ==
- Division of Creative Design
- Division of Digital Entertainment
- Division of Fashion and Life technology
- Division of Tourism and Hospitality

== Notable alumni ==
- Hsu Yao-chang, Magistrate of Miaoli County

== See also ==
- List of universities in Taiwan
