= Song of battle =

Song by Mayday

from the album "Prince of Lan LingTV Soundtrack" "Mayday the Best of 1999‐2013" "Step by Step"
- Language: Mandarin
- Released: August 30, 2013
- Genre: Pop、Rock
- Length: 3:29
- Label: B'in Music
- Composer: Monster
- Lyricist: Ashin

Mayday chronology
"Don'ts Don'ts (傷心的人別聽慢歌)" (2013)	"Song of battle" (2013)	"Step by Step (步步)" (2013)

"Song of battle" (Chinese: 入陣曲) is a single released in 2013 by Taiwanese pop band Mayday, with lyrics written by Ashin and composed by Monster and is the theme song of the TV series "Prince of Lan Ling". The music video centers on the major social controversies in Taiwan at the time, with the lyrics alluding to the political phenomena in Taiwan at the time.

== Music video ==
The first live version of the music video for “Song of battle” was directed by Ruimen (瑞門) and premiered on September 14, 2013, and was taken from the August 17, 2013 Bird's Nest stop of the Noah's Ark World Tour in Beijing, China. The second animated version of the music video, directed by Qiu Huan-sheng (邱煥升), premiered on September 20, 2013, and was the most viewed YouTube video of the year in Taiwan. The film focuses on the major social issues in Taiwan in recent years, including the controversy over the Taitung Miramar Resort, the Dapu incident, the anti-media monopoly movement, the death of Hung Chung-chiu, the Fourth Nuclear Power Plant referendum campaign, the protests of the plant shutdown workers, and the controversy over the Special Investigation Unit's wiretapping, etc. The film is interspersed with scenes of the Taiwan anti-nuclear rally, the White shirt power movement, the protests of the plant shutdown workers, the siege of the Ministry of the Interior by the demolition of the government in August 18, the demolition of the Dapu four-household forced demolition site, and the scenes of the September 18, 2013, the photo of Zhang Senwen (張森文), a forced evictee from Dapu who was found dead after falling into the water, ended with the words "Go to the battlefield" in red paint, which aroused heated debates among netizens in Taiwan

== Awards ==
Year	Unit	Awards	Finalists	Result
2014	The 25th Golden Melody Awards	Best Song of the Year	Song of battle	Nominated
