= Chiu Chen-chun =

Taiwanese politician (born 1971)

Chiu Chen-chun MLY
- 邱鎮軍

Member of the Legislative Yuan
- Incumbent
- Assumed office 1 February 2024
- Preceded by: Hsu Chih-jung
- Constituency: Miaoli 2

Mayor of Miaoli City
- In office 25 December 2018 – 31 January 2024
- Preceded by: Chiu Ping-kun
- Succeeded by: Yeh Chih-hang (acting); Yu Wen-chung

Miaoli County Councilor
- In office 25 December 2014 – 24 December 2018
- Constituency: District 1 (Miaoli City, Gongguan, Touwu)

Personal details
- Born: 7 December 1971 (age 54) Miaoli County, Taiwan
- Party: Kuomintang
- Education: National Chi Nan University (MBA)

Chiu Chen-chun (Chinese: 邱鎮軍; born 7 December 1971) is a Taiwanese politician. He was a member of the Miaoli County Council from 2014 to 2018, when he was elected mayor of Miaoli. Chiu served as mayor until his 2024 election to the Legislative Yuan.

== Early life and education ==
Chiu served in the Republic of China Military Police. He earned a Master of Business Administration (M.B.A.) from National Chi Nan University. Chiu and his wife Chan Mei-chuan each owned arcades in Miaoli from 2012 to the start of Chiu's political career, when ownership of both entities were transferred to Cheng Tsu-wei.

== Political career ==
Chiu won a seat on the Miaoli County Council in 2014, leading all candidates in vote share. In 2018 and 2022, Chiu was elected mayor of Miaoli. In May 2023, Chiu won a Kuomintang party primary against Hsu Yao-chang, during which he was endorsed by sitting legislator Hsu Chih-jung, and defeated independent Miaoli County Councilor Tseng Wen-hsueh in the 2024 legislative election.

=== Recall campaign ===
In February 2025, over 200 Taiwanese authors released a statement supporting campaigns to prevent legislators from destroying Taiwanese literature. Author Li Chiao took leadership of the campaign to recall Chiu, stating, “Legislators should serve the people, not betray their constituents and harm the local community.”
