= Otoemon Hiroeda =

Japanese police officer (1905–1945)

- 廣枝 音右衛門 ひろえだ おとえもん
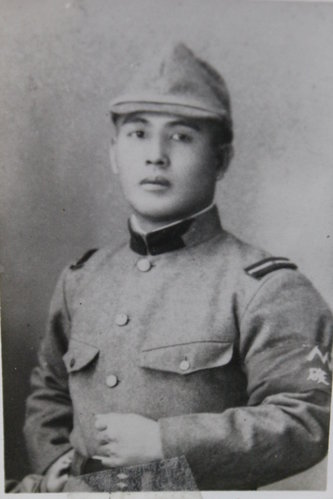
- Born: December 23, 1905; Odawara, Kanagawa, Japan
- Died: February 24, 1945 (aged 39); Manila, Philippines
- Cause of death: Suicide
- Burial place: Toride, Ibaraki, Japan
- Military career
- Rank: Commander

Otoemon Hiroeda (廣枝音右衛門(広枝音右衛門), Hiroeda Otoemon; December 23, 1905 – February 23, 1945) was a Japanese police officer posted to Zhunan, Miaoli in Japanese-era Taiwan. During the Pacific War, he disobeyed orders that he sacrifice the lives of 2000 Taiwanese soldiers under his command in a suicidal attack, and then killed himself. His actions resulted in a spirit tablet for him being enshrined within Quanhua Temple on Lion Head Mountain, Miaoli County, Taiwan.

== Life ==
Hiroeda was born in 1905 in Kataura village (now part of Odawara) in Ashigarashimo District of Kanagawa Prefecture. After graduating from Zushi Kaisei Junior High School, he began the Japanese University preparation course. In April 1928, he joined the Japanese Officer Candidate School, and was assigned to the 57th Infantry Division of the Imperial Japanese Army based in Sakura City. He reached the rank of sergeant by the time of discharge, and then became an elementary school teacher in Yugawara. In 1930, he passed the exam required to become a police officer working for the Governor-General of Taiwan.

While in Taiwan, Hiroeda served as an assistant inspector at the Shichiku (Hsinchu) police station in Shinchiku Prefecture (1939–1940), as an assistant inspector at Ōtani county (Daxi) police station (1941), and as an inspector at Ōko county (Dahu) police station (1942).

Subsequently, Hiroeda served as head of the Zhunan local government. As the Pacific War escalated, Hiroeda was ordered to assume command of a naval patrol squadron, which consisted of 2000 Taiwanese soldiers. In 1943, Hiroeda and his squadron boarded a refitted merchant ship (the Busho Maru) at Takao, and were transported to Cavite on Luzon island in the Philippines. In February 1945, the United States Army reached the outskirts of Manila. The encircled Japanese forces were slowly forced to retreat, and Hiroeda was ordered to supply the Taiwanese soldiers under his command with sticks attached to warheads, for use in suicide charges against enemy tanks. However, Hiroeda refused to carry out his orders, and together with his Taiwanese sergeant, Liu Wei-tian (Chinese: 劉維添; pinyin: Liú Wéitiān; 1922–2013), entered secret negotiations with the US forces. In the afternoon of February 23, Hiroeda ordered the soldiers under his command to surrender to the US forces, saying, "You are Taiwanese and no doubt have wives, parents, and siblings waiting for you at home. It is unfortunate we cannot return together, but you men at least should return home alive. I am Japanese, and therefore I alone am responsible for this". Hiroeda then committed suicide by shooting himself. He was 40 years old.

== Memorials ==
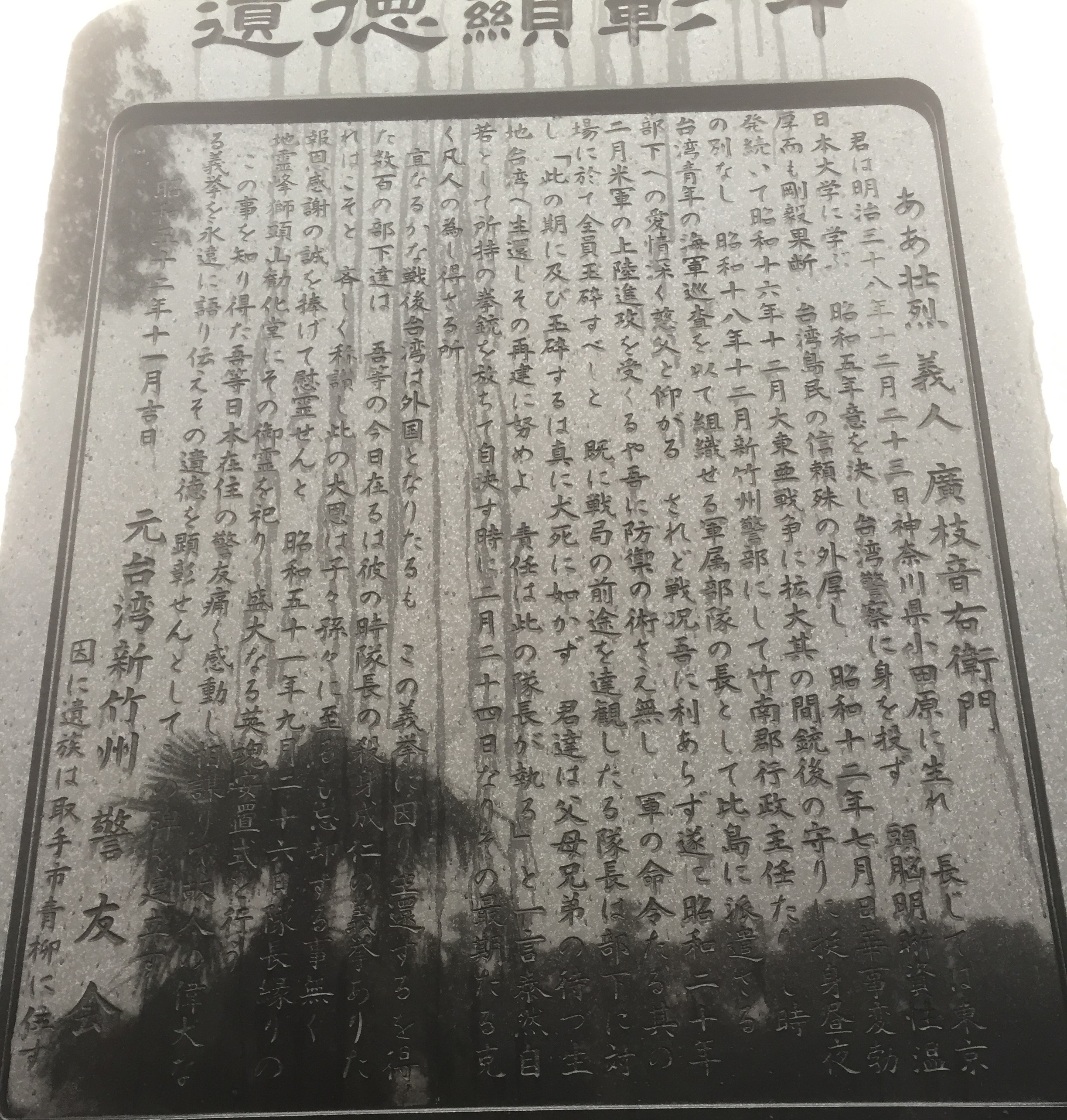
Otoemon's stone monument which constructed by his ex subordinates

From 1976 onwards, Liu Wei-tian organized an annual remembrance service for Hiroeda, and also requested that Hiroeda be enshrined within Quanhua Temple on Lion Head Mountain. In 1985, Liu returned to the site at which Hiroeda killed himself in Manila, and took some of the earth to give to Hiroeda's relatives (in lieu of Hiroeda's remains, which were never recovered). In 1988, permission was given to add the name of Hiroeda's wife, Fumi Hiroeda (広枝ふみ), to his spirit tablet. Following Liu's death in 2013, Liu's son-in-law has continued to keep in touch with the friends and relatives of Hiroeda, who regularly visit Taiwan to pray at Quanhua Temple.
