= Mingde Dam =

Dam in Touwu, Miaoli County, Taiwan

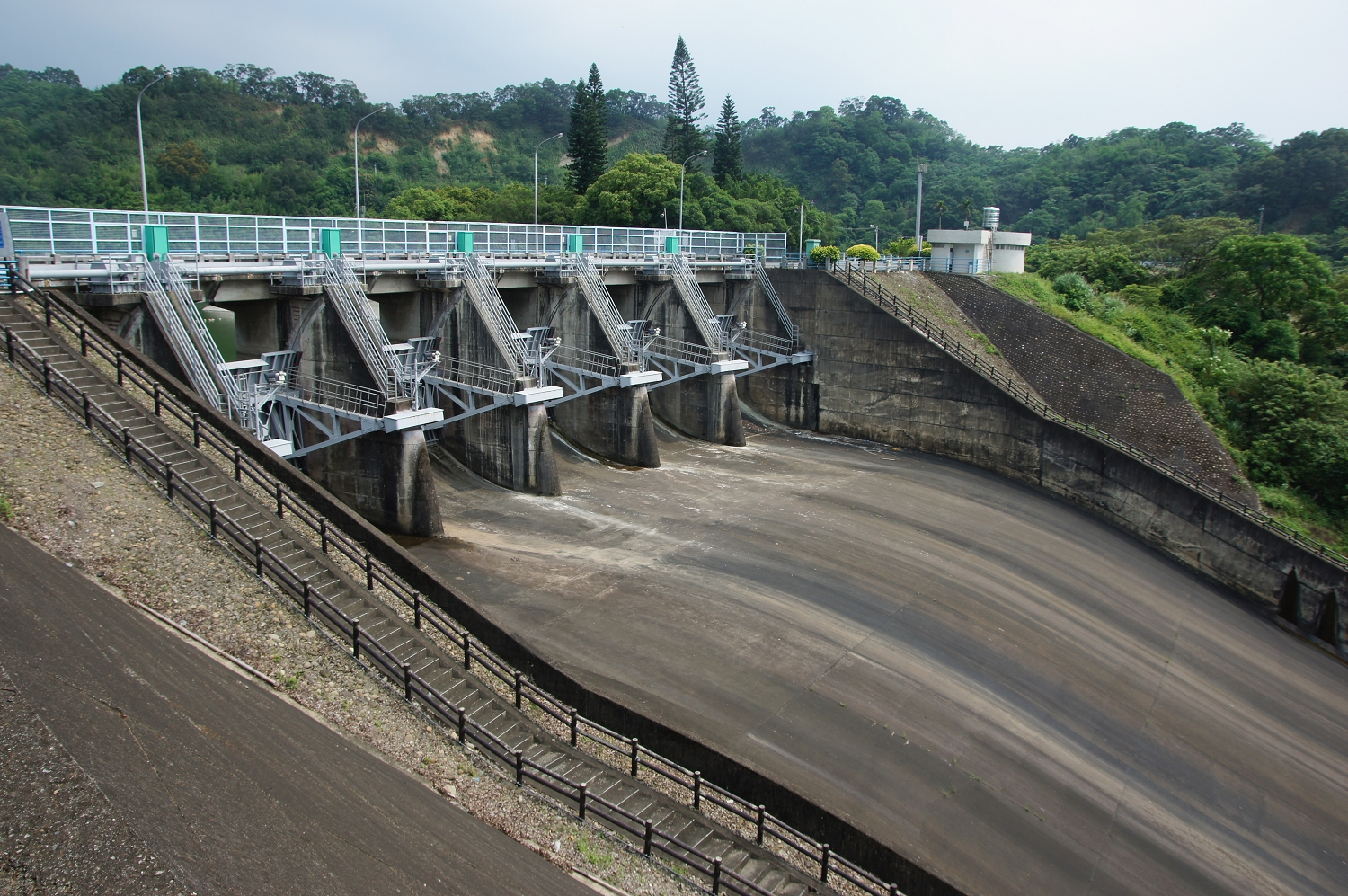

- Location within Miaoli County
- Official name: 明德水壩
- Location: Touwu, Miaoli County, Taiwan
- Coordinates: 24°34′54″N 120°53′04″E
- Status: Operational
- Construction began: 1966; 60 years ago
- Opening date: 1970; 56 years ago

Dam and spillways
- Length: 187 m (614 ft)
- Dam volume: 17.1 million m^{3}
- Spillways: 6
- Spillway capacity: 1,200 m^{3}/s

Reservoir
- Catchment area: 61.08 km^{2}

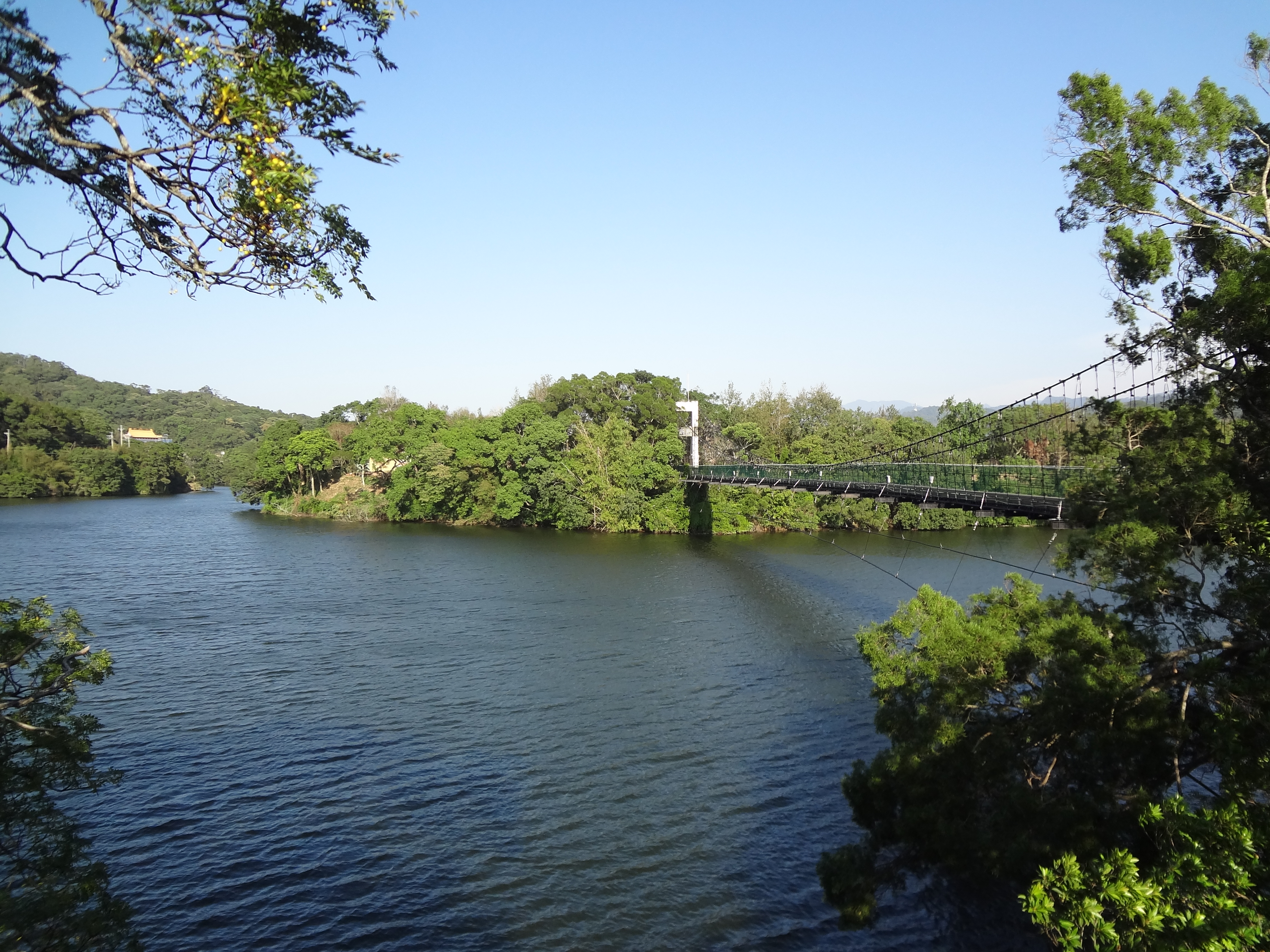
Mingde Reservoir

Mingde Dam (Chinese: 明德水壩; pinyin: Míngdé Shuǐbà) is a rockfill dam across the Laotianliao River in central Touwu Township, Miaoli County, Taiwan. The Mingde Reservoir (明德水庫 Míngdé Shuǐkù) behind the dam serves mainly for irrigation and municipal water supply for Miaoli City. The dam consists of a main embankment 35.5 metres (116 ft) high and 187 metres (614 ft) long, holding back a reservoir with a capacity of 17.1 million cubic metres (14,350 acre feet). The dam and reservoir control runoff from a catchment area of 61.08 square kilometres (23.58 mi^{2}). A spillway located to the north of the main dam consists of a six-bay gated overflow section, with a release capacity of 1,200 cubic metres per second (42,000 cu ft/s).

== History ==
The dam was built in 1966–1970.

== See also ==
- List of dams and reservoirs in Taiwan
