= Miaoli Park =

Cultural center in Tongluo, Miaoli County, Taiwan

- 苗栗客家文化園區
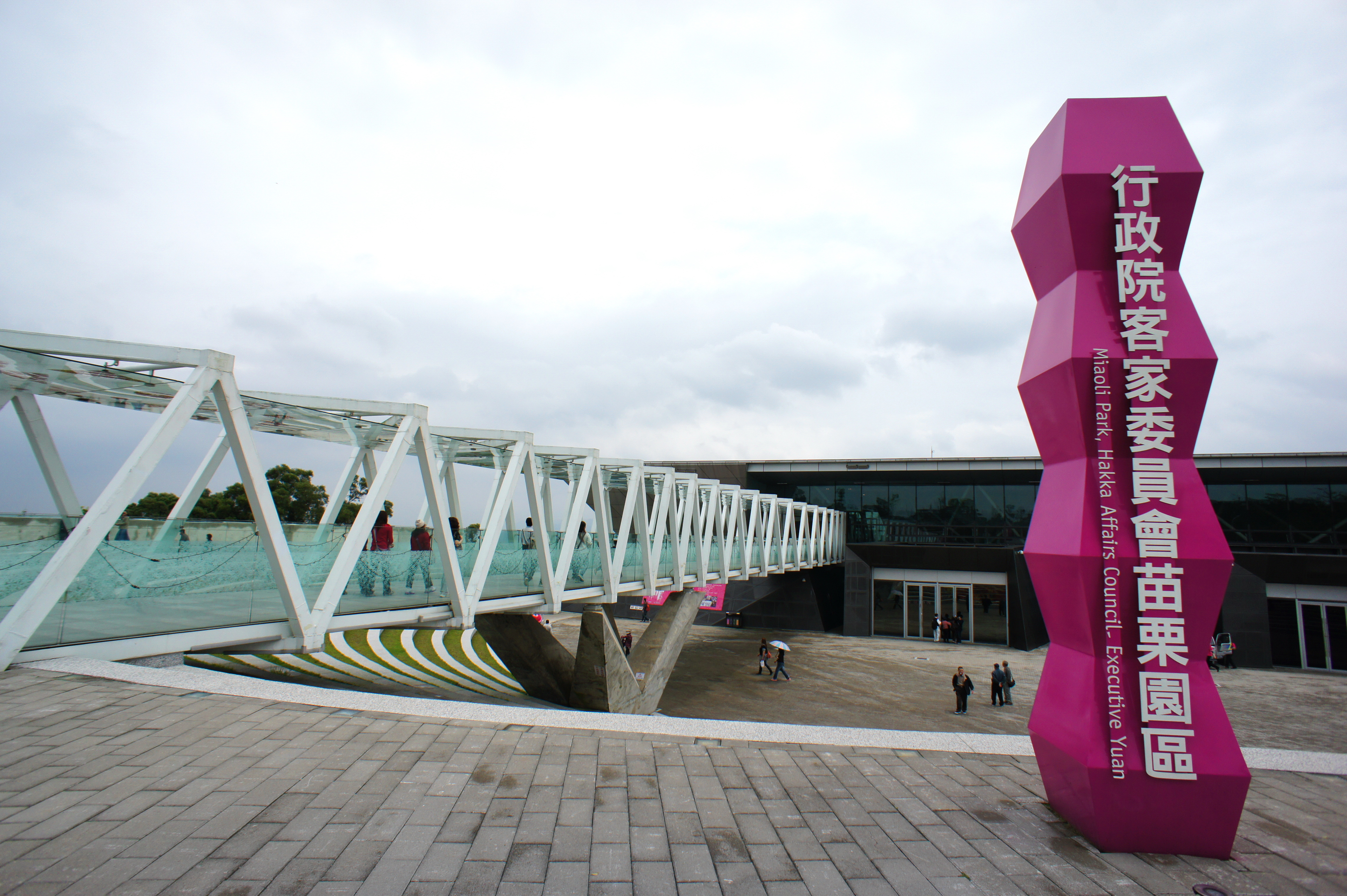
- Interactive map of Miaoli Park
- Location: Tongluo, Miaoli County, Taiwan
- Coordinates: 24°27′45.8″N 120°46′15.4″E
- Type: cultural center
- Public transit: Tongluo Station

Construction
- Opened: 12 May 2012

Website
- Official website

The Miaoli Park (traditional Chinese: 苗栗客家文化園區; simplified Chinese: 苗栗客家文化园区; pinyin: Miáolì Kèjiā Wénhuà Yuánqū) is a cultural center in Tongluo Township, Miaoli County, Taiwan about Hakka people.

== History ==
The center was opened on 12 May 2012. In 2015, the park started its second development plan, which consisted of 4.3 hectares first development phase and 6.9 hectares second development phase.

== Architecture ==
The center spans over an area of 4.32 hectares.

== Exhibitions ==
The permanent exhibition at the center are:

- Life under Hakka people house for extended family
- Traditional industries
- Traditional craft
- Traditional music
- Railway heart - Hakka love
- Colorful Hakka culture

== Transportation ==
The center is accessible within walking distance south of Tongluo Station of Taiwan Railway.

== See also ==
- List of tourist attractions in Taiwan
- Liudui Hakka Cultural Park
