= Wu Yi-chen =

Taiwanese lawyer and politician

- 吳宜臻
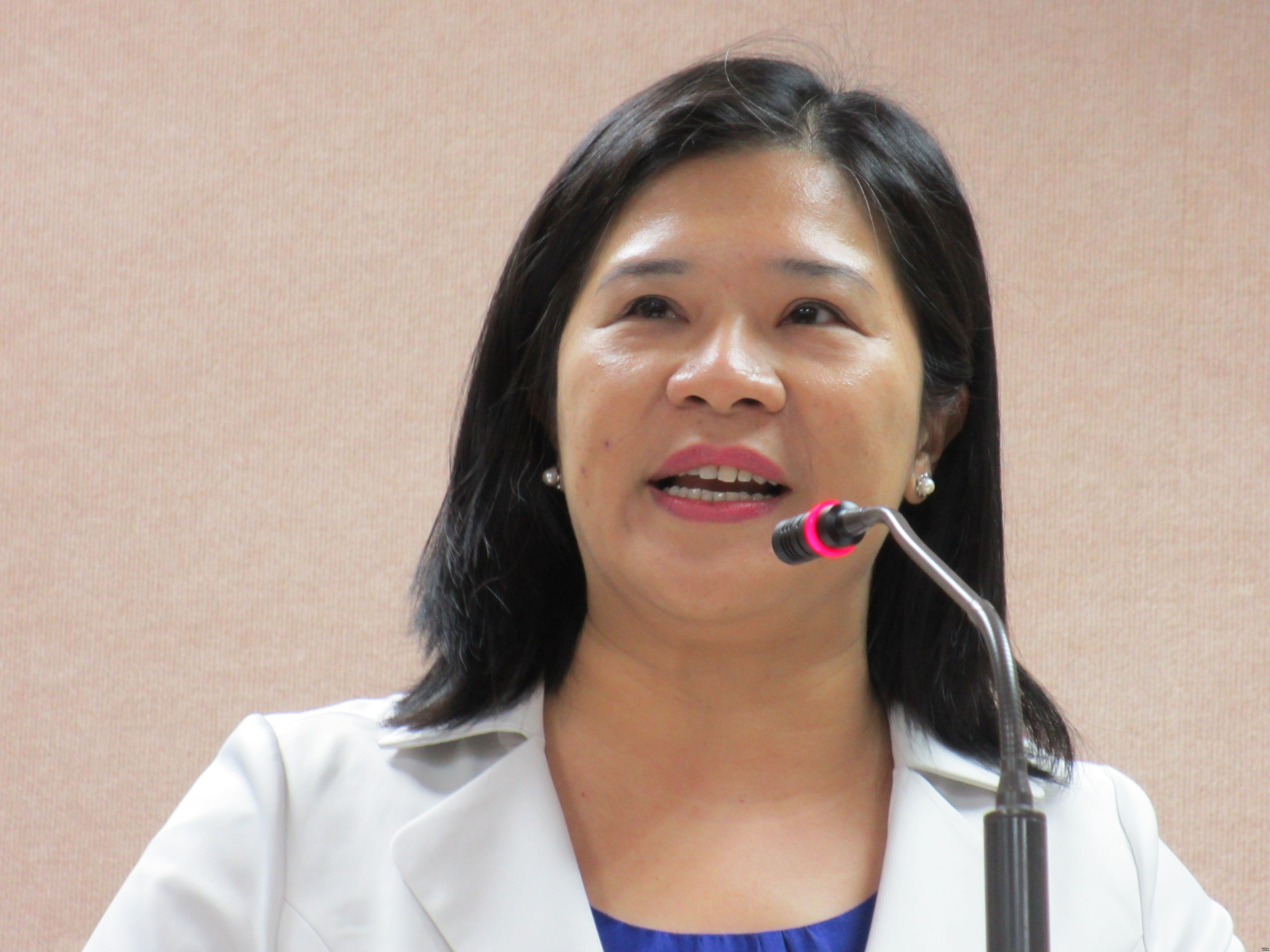

Member of the Legislative Yuan
- In office 1 February 2012 – 31 January 2016
- Constituency: Republic of China

Personal details
- Born: Wu Mei-hui; 23 April 1970 (age 56) Taipei County, Taiwan
- Party: Democratic Progressive Party
- Education: National Taiwan University (LLB); National Chiao Tung University (LLM)

Wu Yi-chen (Chinese: 吳宜臻; pinyin: Wú Yízhēn; born 23 April 1970) is a Taiwanese lawyer and politician.

== Early life and education ==
She was born Wu Mei-hui and attended National Taiwan University, where she earned a bachelor's degree in law before obtaining a Master of Laws (LL.M.) from National Chiao Tung University. Prior to serving on the Legislative Yuan, Wu was leader of the Taipei Association for the Promotion of Women's Rights.

== Political career ==
=== Electoral history ===
Wu was nominated for an at-large legislative seat in 2011, representing the Democratic Progressive Party, and elected via party list proportional representation. She was named the DPP candidate for the magistracy of Miaoli County in April 2014. During the campaign, Wu pledged to establish a voting process for public construction projects in light of the Dapu incident. She also promised financial reform within the Miaoli County Government. Wu lost the magisterial election to Kuomintang candidate Hsu Yao-chang.

2014 Miaoli County Magistrate Election Result
No.	Candidate	Party	Votes	Percentage
1	Hsu Yao-chang	KMT	147,547	46.59%
2	Kang Shi-ru (康世儒)	Independent	60,356	19.06%
3	Jiang Ming-xiu (江明修)	Independent	14,978	4.73%
4	Chen Shu-fen (陳淑芬)	Independent	2,137	0.67%
5	Zeng Guo-liang (曾國良)	Independent	1,807	0.57%
6	Wu Yi-chen	DPP	89,838	28.37%

She planned to contest Hsu's vacant legislative seat, but left the race after Sunflower Student Movement leader Chen Wei-ting launched an independent bid for the office. The Democratic Progressive Party pulled their support of Chen after he confirmed past allegations of sexual harassment, later asking Wu to rejoin the race. Wu lost the by-election to Kuomintang candidate Hsu Chih-jung. By October 2017, Wu was considered a probable DPP candidate for the Miaoli County magistracy to be contested in November 2018.

=== Political stances ===
As a legislator, Wu continued her advocacy of gender equality and women's rights. She stated in February 2012 that military academies should not bar women who have undergone oophorectomies or hysterectomies from admittance. She opposed an April 2012 amendment to the Civil Servants Election and Recall Act submitted by Chi Kuo-tung proposing that legislative seats reserved for women be filled by women only, in cases that the original female candidate cannot take office, even if the candidate with the next-highest vote share is male. In August, Wu participated in a protest calling for Japan to apologize for the use of comfort women during World War II. Wu has criticized mother-child bonding programs offered by some hospitals as inflexible. In 2013, she pushed for amendments to the Domestic Violence Prevention Act recognizing violence between unmarried partners who do not live together as a crime. Wu has attempted to broaden the rage of services offered to people affected by domestic violence, stating that her efforts "can change the chain of factors that lead to an environment of domestic violence and prevent future cases from happening." Wu also backed harsher penalties for distributors of revenge porn.

Wu is a staunch proponent of healthcare reform. She berated the government for mandating supplementary premiums in April 2012, and derided proposed revisions to the Medical Care Act that made medical providers less susceptible to malpractice lawsuits. In January 2014, Wu drew attention to the ineffectiveness of a voluntary accreditation process for aesthetic medical facilities by revealing that some accredited clinics had been advertising platelet-rich plasma treatments, which had not yet been legalized.

Wu is supportive of judicial reform, and has accused the Taiwanese judiciary of politicizing cases. Additionally, she has routinely spoken out against other abuses of government power, namely land expropriation, use of surveillance, police brutality, and ignorance of checks and balances. Her statements on related topics included continual reprimands issued to the Special Investigation Division of the Supreme Prosecutors' Office for several of its actions. In September 2013, when it was revealed that the SID had wiretapped Ker Chien-ming, a legislative investigation was launched. Findings included that only 208 of more than 500,000 wiretaps since 2007 were monitored via judicial inquiry. Wu then suggested a single department at the Taiwan High Court be established to oversee wiretapping, and later helped pass a bill regulating the use of wiretaps. Wu has also advocated for the dissolution of the Control Yuan. She is opposed to the mass reduction of prison sentences, citing high recidivism rates among prisoners with shorter sentences.

Her other interests include labor rights and compensation for workers in the public and service sectors, such as police and teachers, the environment, and preservation of Hakka culture.

== Personal life ==
Wu has one child.
