= Zhuolan =

Urban township in Miaoli County, Taiwan

Coordinates: 24°19′20″N 120°50′41″E

Zhuolan Township 卓蘭鎮 Jhuolan
- Urban township
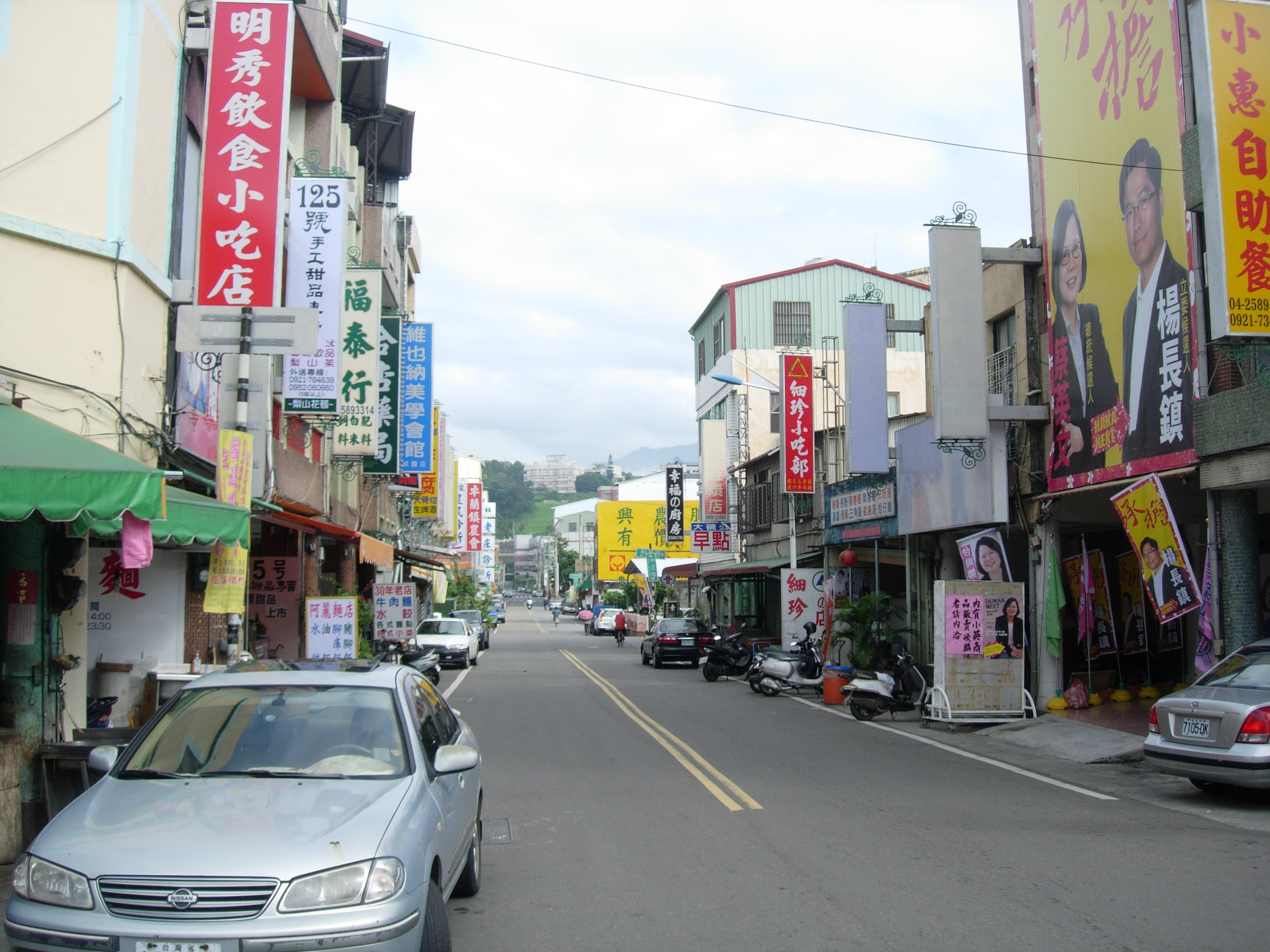

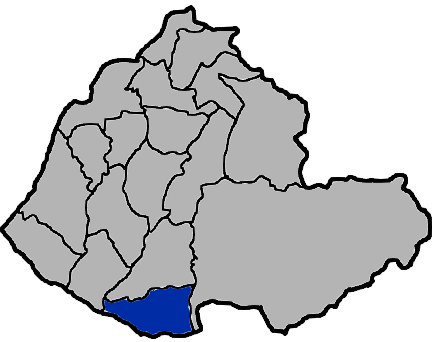
- Zuolan Township in Miaoli County
- Location: Miaoli County, Taiwan

Area
  - Total: 76.33 km^{2} (29.47 sq mi)

Population (January 2023)
  - Total: 15,505
- Website: www.juolan.gov.tw (in Chinese)

Zhuolan Township
- Chinese: 卓蘭鎮
- Hanyu Pinyin: Zhuólán Zhèn
- Wade–Giles: Cho^{2}-lan^{2} Chen^{4}
- Tongyong Pinyin: Jhuólán Jhèn
- Pha̍k-fa-sṳ: Cho̍k-làn-chṳ́n
- Hokkien POJ: Tah-lân-tìn

Zhuolan Township is an urban township in Miaoli County, Taiwan.

== History ==
Formerly called Talan (Chinese: 罩蘭; Pe̍h-ōe-jī: Tà-lân).

== Geography ==
In January 2023, Zhuolan's population was estimated at 15,505. The township occupies an area of 76.33 square kilometres (29.47 sq mi). It receives approximately 2,100 millimetres (83 in) of rain each year, mostly during May–June and August–October.

== Administrative divisions ==
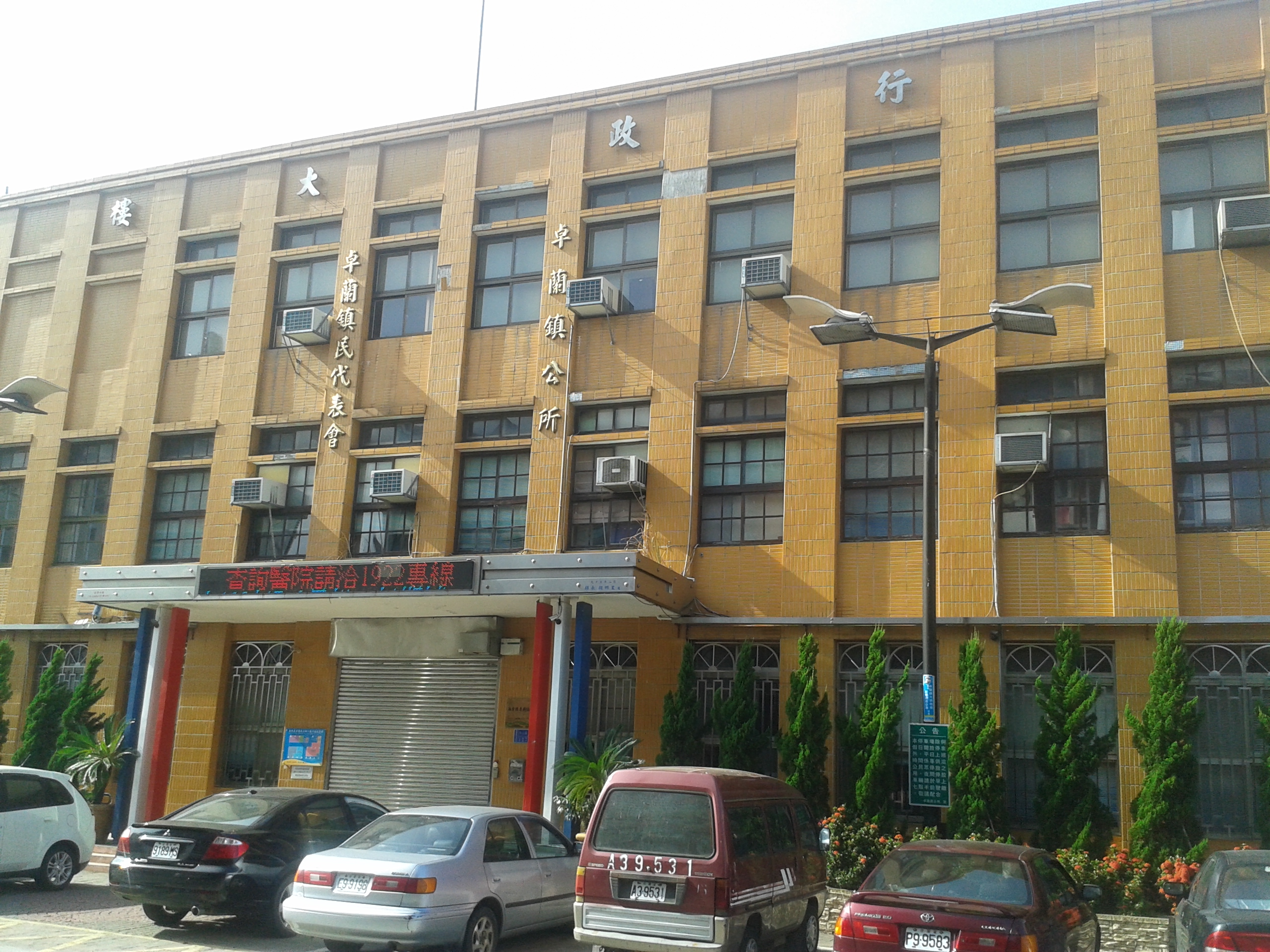
Zhuolan Township office

The township comprises 11 villages: Fengtian, Jingshan, Laozhuang, Miaofeng, Neiwan, Pinglin, Shangxin, Xincuo, Xinrong, Xiping and Zhongjie.

== Politics ==
The township is part of Miaoli County Constituency II electoral district for Legislative Yuan.

== Economy ==
=== Agricultural products ===
Pears, grapes, starfruits and tangerines are the four main kinds of fruits grown in Zhuolan.

== Tourist attractions ==
- Lixiping Leisure Agriculture Area

== Transportation ==
=== Bus station ===
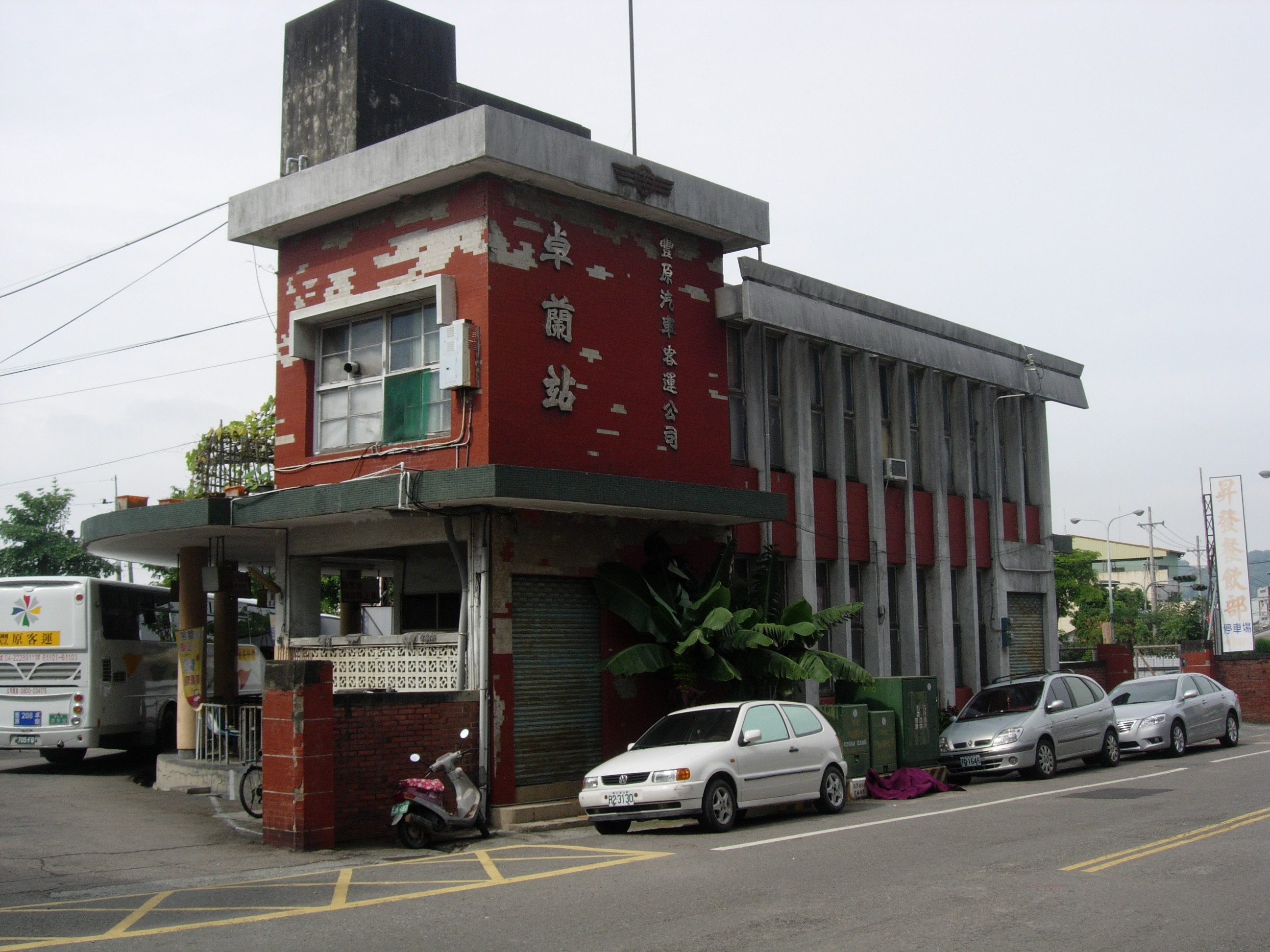
Zhuolan Bus Station

Bus station in the township is Zhuolan Bus Station of Fengyuan Bus. Taichung City Bus routes link Zhuolan with Fengyuan and Dongshi districts of Taichung City. Another bus route is to Dahu Township operate by Hsintsu Bus.

=== Highway ===
Provincial Highway 3 passes by Zhuolan, linking it with Dahu, Miaoli County to the north and Dongshi District, Taichung to the south.
