= Liu Cheng-hung =

Taiwanese politician (born 1947)

- 劉政鴻
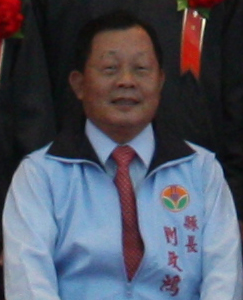

Magistrate of Miaoli County
- In office 20 December 2005 – 25 December 2014
- Preceded by: Fu Hsueh-peng
- Succeeded by: Hsu Yao-chang

Personal details
- Born: 12 November 1947 (age 78) Houlong, Miaoli County, Taiwan Province, Republic of China
- Party: Kuomintang
- Education: Chinese Culture University

Liu Cheng-hung (traditional Chinese: 劉政鴻; simplified Chinese: 刘政鸿; pinyin: Liú Zhènghóng; born 12 November 1947) is a Taiwanese politician. He was the Magistrate of Miaoli County from 20 December 2005 until 25 December 2014.

== Controversies ==
=== Shoe throwing incident ===
On 18 September 2013, a shoe was thrown at him by student Chen Wei-ting (陳為廷) when Liu attempted to offer his condolences during the memorial service to the family of a man named Chang Sen-wen (張森文), who was found dead in a water channel under a bridge at Dapu, Zhunan. Supporters and relatives of Chang held Liu responsible for Chang's death because Chang's pharmacy was one of several structures destroyed by the county government on 17 July 2013 to make way for the construction of a new campus at the Hsinchu Science Park. On 25 June 2015, the Taichung branch of Taiwan High Court ruled Chen guilty in the shoe-throwing incident but exempted him from any punishment.

=== Impeachment ===
The Control Yuan impeached Liu in August 2016 after an investigation found that Miaoli County accrued a debt of NT$67.6 billion under his leadership.
