= Provincial Highway 6 (Taiwan) =

Provincial highway in Taiwan

Provincial Highway 6
- 台6線
- Old Houwen Highway

Route information
- Maintained by Directorate General of Highways
- Length: 31.388 km (19.504 mi)

Major junctions
- North end: Prov 61 in Houlong
- Nat 3 in Houlong; Nat 1 in Gongguan
- South end: Prov 3 in Wenshui, Shitan

Location
- Country: Taiwan

Highway system
- Highway system in Taiwan
← Prov 5	→ Prov 7

Provincial Highway 6 (Chinese: 台6線) is a highway connecting Houlong, Miaoli and Dahu, Miaoli. The entire highway is within Miaoli County. The highway is now primarily used for local access after the completion of (Provincial Highway 72), an expressway running parallel to the highway.

== Route description ==
The route is a major highway in Miaoli County, as it connects the coastal townships in Miaoli with the mountainous ones. It is also known as Old Houwen Highway (舊後汶公路) since the terminus of the highway is Houlong and Wenshui (汶水), a village in Shitan.

The highway begins at the West Coastal Expressway (西濱快速道路), signed as PH 61, in the coastal township of Houlong. The highway closely follows Houlong River, passing through junctions with PH 1, Freeway 3, PH 13 as it reaches Miaoli City. The highway continues to head south towards Gongguan, where it meets Freeway 1. Highway 4 reaches its terminus at an intersection with PH 3 at the border of Shitan and Dahu townships.
