= Yongheshan Reservoir =

Reservoir in Sanwan, Miaoli County, Taiwan

- 永和山水庫 (Chinese)
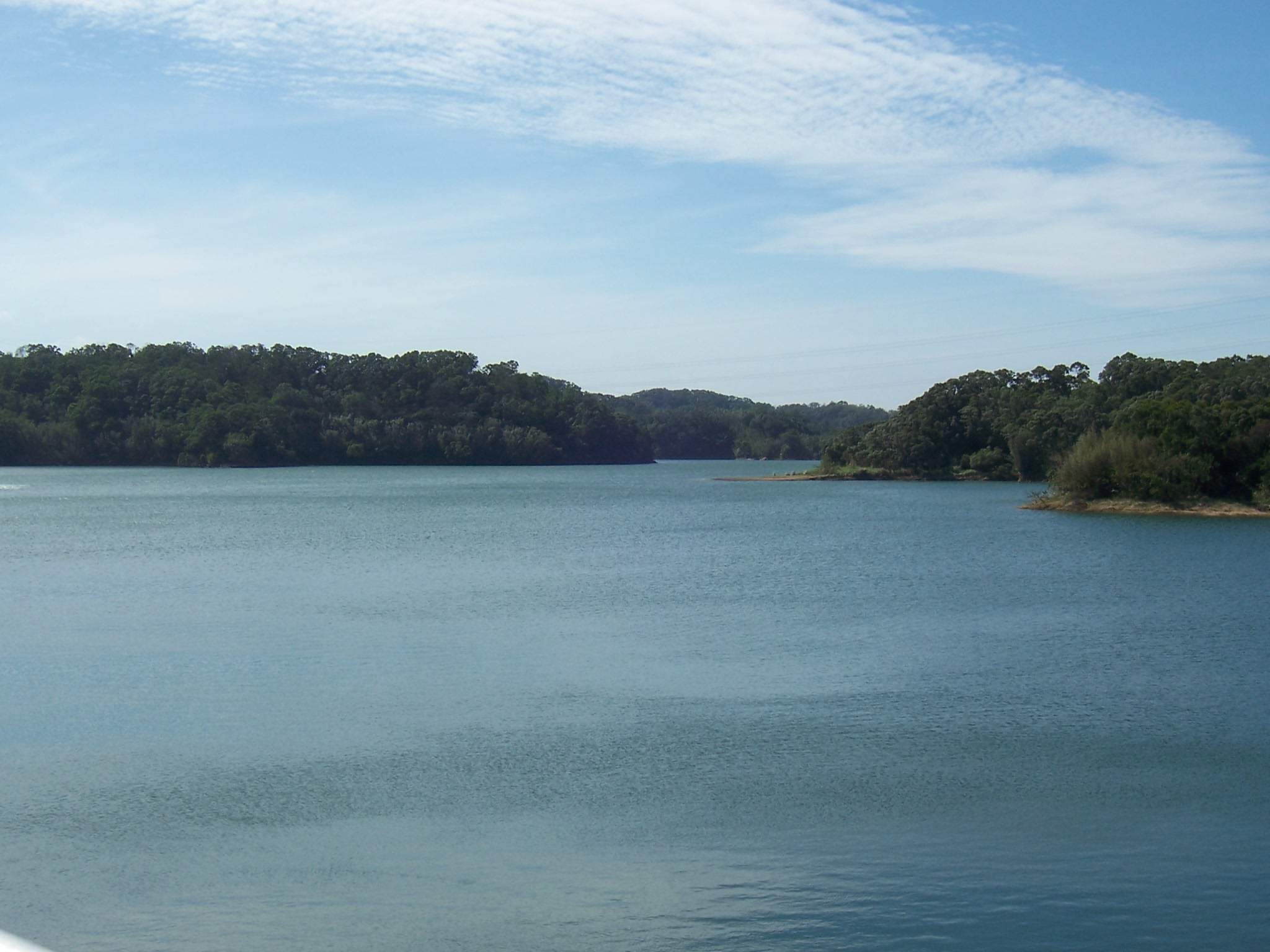

- Location within Miaoli County
- Location: Sanwan, Miaoli County, Taiwan
- Coordinates: 24°39′14.5″N 120°55′25.4″E
- Type: reservoir
- River sources: Beikenggou River, Nanzhuang River
- Built: 1980–1984; 42 years ago
- Surface area: 1.65 square kilometres (0.64 sq mi)
- Max. depth: 89.5 metres (294 ft)
- Water volume: 28,096,000 cubic metres (992,200,000 cu ft)

The Yongheshan Reservoir (traditional Chinese: 永和山水庫; simplified Chinese: 永和山水库; pinyin: Yǒnghéshān Shuǐkù) is a reservoir in Sanwan Township, Miaoli County, Taiwan.

== History ==
The construction of the dam began in July 1980 and finished in October 1984.

== Architecture ==
The water level of the reservoir stands at a height of 89.5 meters (294 ft). The reservoir features automatic overflow side spillway. The reservoir has an effective capacity of 28,096,000 m^{3}.

== Function ==
The reservoir supplies water to public sectors for about 187,000 m^{3} per day.

== See also ==
- Geography of Taiwan
