= Tung Lo Wan =

Tung Lo Wan (銅鑼灣) may refer to:

- The transliteration of the Chinese name of Causeway Bay, Hong Kong, as in Tung Lo Wan Road
- Tung Lo Wan (Sha Tin), a village in Tai Wai, Sha Tin District, Hong Kong
