= Dahu, Miaoli =

Rural township in Miaoli County, Taiwan

Coordinates: 24°23′52″N 120°50′55″E

Dahu Township 大湖鄉 Daiko
- Rural township
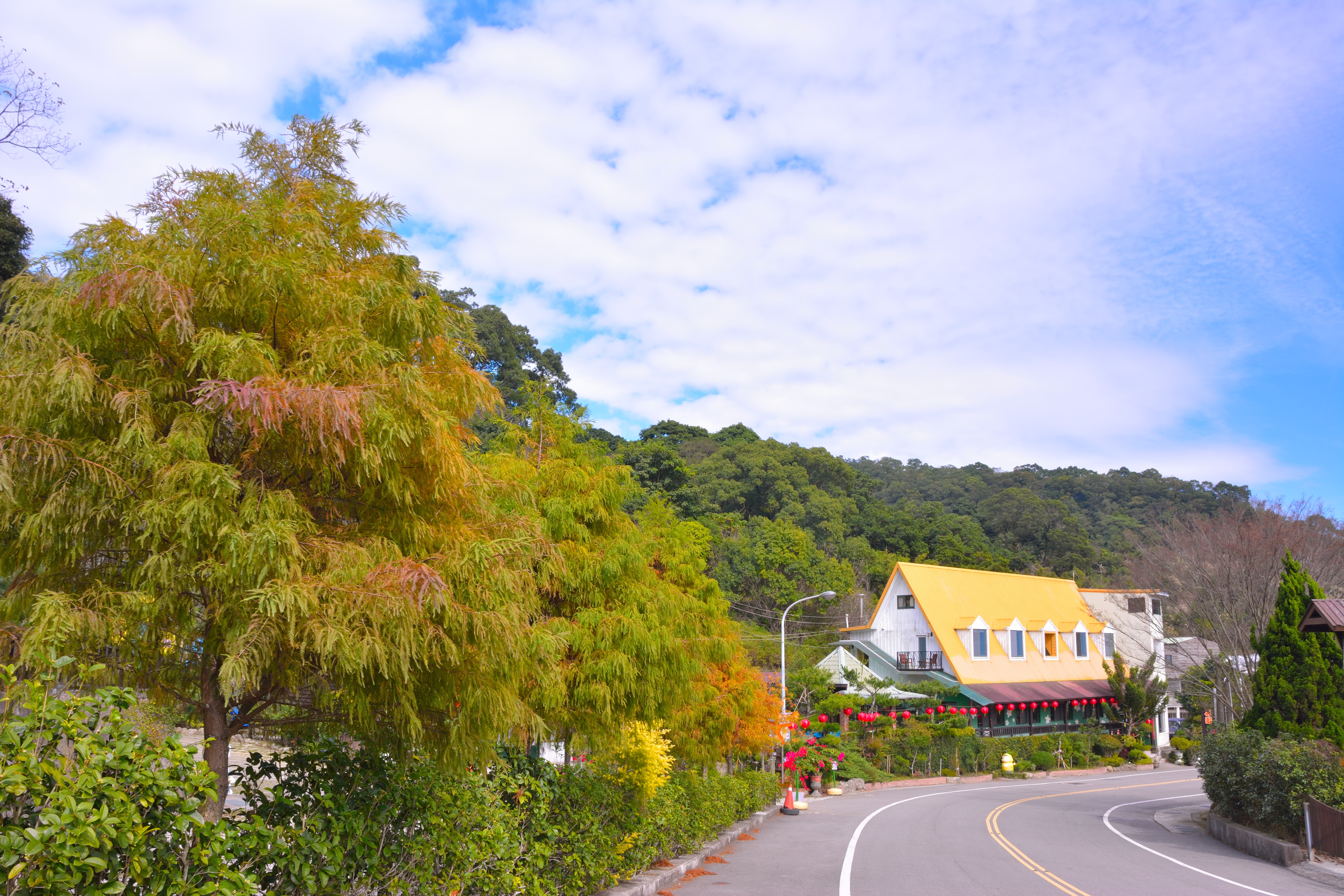

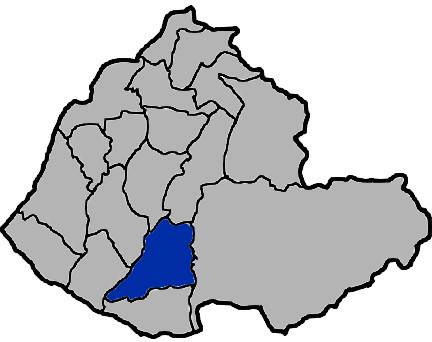
- Dahu Township in Miaoli County
- Location: Miaoli County, Taiwan

Area
  - Total: 91 km^{2} (35 sq mi)

Population (September 2023)
  - Total: 13,035
  - Density: 140/km^{2} (370/sq mi)
- Website: www.dahu.gov.tw (in Chinese)

Dahu Township (Chinese: 大湖鄉; pinyin: Dàhú Xiāng) is a rural township in the south of Miaoli County, Taiwan.

== Geography ==
As of September 2023, it had 13,035 inhabitants. Its area is 90.84 square kilometres (35.07 sq mi).

== Administrative divisions ==
The township comprises 12 villages: Dahu, Daliao, Danan, Fuxing, Jinghu, Lilin, Minghu, Nanhu, Tungxing, Wurong, Xinkai and Yihe.

== Politics ==
The township is part of Miaoli County Constituency II electoral district for Legislative Yuan.

== Economy ==
The location is famous for strawberry cultivation. The township produces 80% of the total output of strawberry in Taiwan, both in terms of cultivation area and production. Other local crops include: Rosa rugosa, Ginger and Sunflower.

== Education ==
- National Dahu Agricultural & Industrial Vocational High School
- Dahu Junior High School
- Nanhu Junior High School
- Dahu Elementary School

== Infrastructures ==
- Headquarters office of Shei-Pa National Park

== Tourist attractions ==
- Dahu Strawberry Cultural Center
- Shei-Pa National Park

== Transportation ==
- Provincial Highway No.3
- Provincial Highway No.6
- Provincial Highway No.72: form Houlong to Wenshui

== Climate ==
Climate data for Dahu, elevation 286 m (938 ft), (2019–2023, extremes 2018–present)
| Month | Jan | Feb | Mar | Apr | May | Jun | Jul | Aug | Sep | Oct | Nov | Dec | Year |
|---|---|---|---|---|---|---|---|---|---|---|---|---|---|
| Record high °C (°F) | 29.3 (84.7) | 32.7 (90.9) | 33.7 (92.7) | 33.5 (92.3) | 36.4 (97.5) | 35.2 (95.4) | 37.9 (100.2) | 36.5 (97.7) | 34.4 (93.9) | 34.4 (93.9) | 33.0 (91.4) | 29.3 (84.7) | 37.9 (100.2) |
| Mean daily maximum °C (°F) | 20.5 (68.9) | 22.1 (71.8) | 24.8 (76.6) | 26.5 (79.7) | 29.4 (84.9) | 31.6 (88.9) | 33.0 (91.4) | 32.1 (89.8) | 31.3 (88.3) | 28.6 (83.5) | 26.4 (79.5) | 21.1 (70.0) | 27.3 (81.1) |
| Daily mean °C (°F) | 14.7 (58.5) | 15.6 (60.1) | 18.4 (65.1) | 20.6 (69.1) | 24.0 (75.2) | 26.3 (79.3) | 27.1 (80.8) | 26.4 (79.5) | 25.4 (77.7) | 22.9 (73.2) | 20.0 (68.0) | 15.8 (60.4) | 21.4 (70.6) |
| Mean daily minimum °C (°F) | 10.8 (51.4) | 11.4 (52.5) | 13.9 (57.0) | 16.3 (61.3) | 20.1 (68.2) | 22.5 (72.5) | 23.0 (73.4) | 22.6 (72.7) | 21.3 (70.3) | 19.1 (66.4) | 15.6 (60.1) | 12.2 (54.0) | 17.4 (63.3) |
| Record low °C (°F) | 1.8 (35.2) | 2.5 (36.5) | 5.2 (41.4) | 5.0 (41.0) | 13.2 (55.8) | 19.7 (67.5) | 20.1 (68.2) | 20.2 (68.4) | 15.2 (59.4) | 8.6 (47.5) | 7.2 (45.0) | 2.3 (36.1) | 1.8 (35.2) |
| Average precipitation mm (inches) | 50.7 (2.00) | 154.6 (6.09) | 155.6 (6.13) | 202.4 (7.97) | 231.8 (9.13) | 429.7 (16.92) | 248.2 (9.77) | 453.7 (17.86) | 131.2 (5.17) | 70.0 (2.76) | 13.2 (0.52) | 37.5 (1.48) | 2,178.6 (85.8) |
| Average precipitation days | 7.2 | 8.5 | 11.3 | 11.0 | 13.0 | 15.1 | 13.3 | 17.1 | 8.4 | 4.1 | 4.0 | 5.8 | 118.8 |
| Average relative humidity (%) | 86.9 | 86.9 | 86.5 | 86.1 | 87.3 | 86.4 | 86.0 | 88.7 | 85.8 | 83.9 | 86.2 | 86.3 | 86.4 |
Source 1: Central Weather Administration
Source 2: Atmospheric Science Research and Application Databank (precipitation 1991–2020, precipitation days and humidity 2000–2023)
