= Tongluo railway station =

Railway station located in Miaoli, Taiwan

Tongluo Station 銅鑼車站
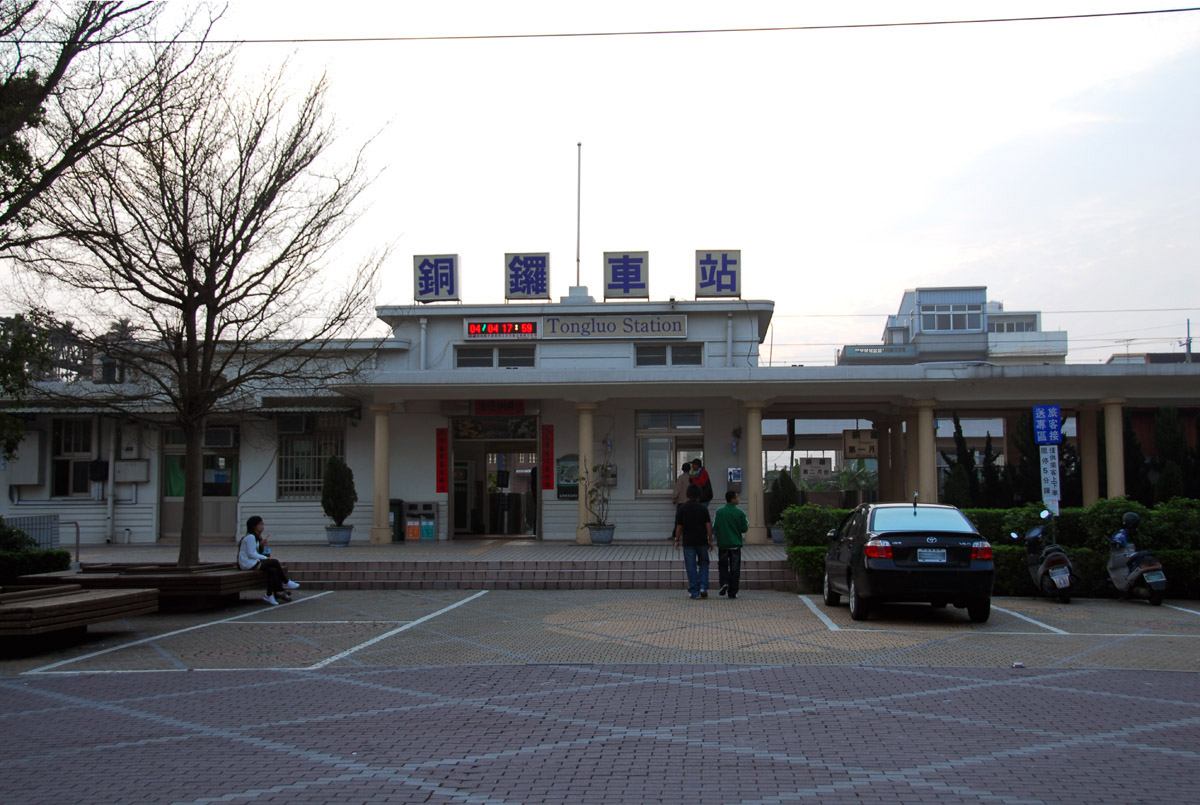

General information
- Location: Tongluo, Miaoli County, Taiwan
- Coordinates: 24°29′13.31″N 120°47′10.40″E
- Owner: Taiwan Railway
- Operator: Taiwan Railway
- Line: Western Trunk line
- Train operators: Taiwan Railway

History
- Opened: 7 October 1903

Services
Preceding station	Taiwan Railway	Following station
Nanshi towards Keelung	Western Trunk line	Sanyi towards Kaohsiung
Location

Tongluo (Chinese: 銅鑼車站; pinyin: Tóngluó Chēzhàn) is a railway station on the Taiwan Railway Taichung line located in Tongluo Township, Miaoli County, Taiwan.

== History ==
The station was opened on 7 October 1903.

== Around the station ==
- Miaoli Park

== See also ==
- List of railway and metro stations in Taiwan
