= Sanwan =

Rural township in Miaoli County, Taiwan

Coordinates: 24.632038°N 120.936787°E

Sanwan Township 三灣鄉
- Rural township
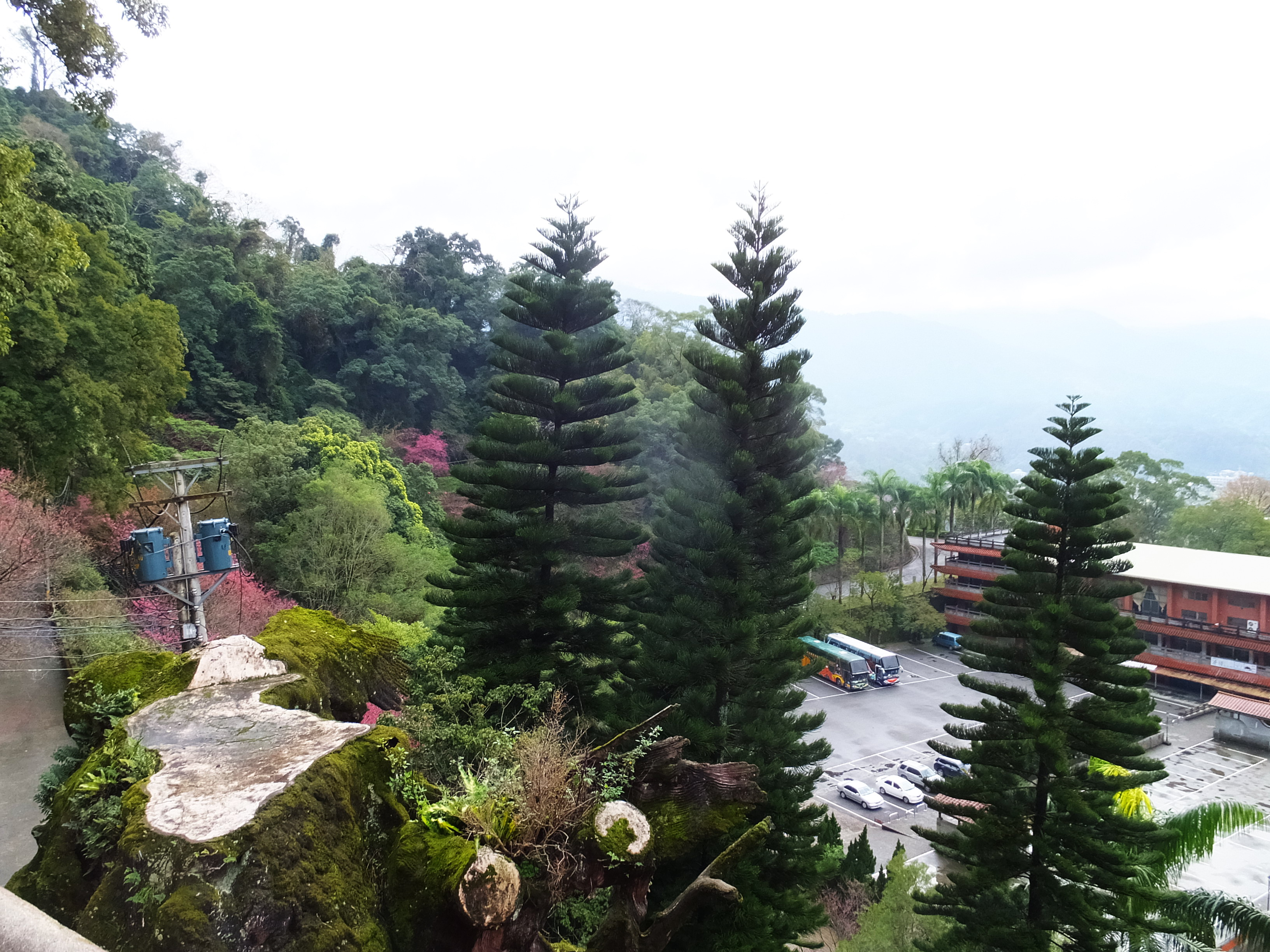

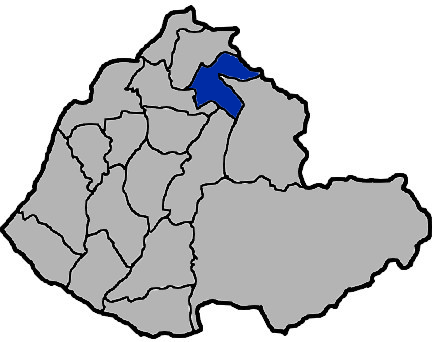
- Sanwan Township in Miaoli County
- Location: Miaoli County, Taiwan

Area
  - Total: 52 km^{2} (20 sq mi)

Population (July 2018)
  - Total: 6,700
  - Density: 130/km^{2} (330/sq mi)
- Website: www.sanwan.gov.tw (in Chinese)

Sanwan Township
- Chinese: 三灣鄉
- Hanyu Pinyin: Sānwān Xiāng
- Wade–Giles: San^{1}-wan^{1} Hsiang^{1}
- Pha̍k-fa-sṳ: Sâm-vân-hiông
- Hokkien POJ: Sam-oan-hiong

Sanwan Township is a rural township in northern Miaoli County, Taiwan. It lies between the Taiwan Strait on the west and mountains on the east.

== Geography ==
- Area: 52.30 square kilometres (20.19 sq mi)
- Population: 6,864 (January 2017)

== Administrative divisions ==
The township comprises eight villages: Beipu, Dahe, Daping, Dingliao, Neiwan, Sanwan, Tongjing and Yonghe.

== Politics ==
The township is part of Miaoli County Constituency II electoral district for Legislative Yuan.

== Tourist attractions ==
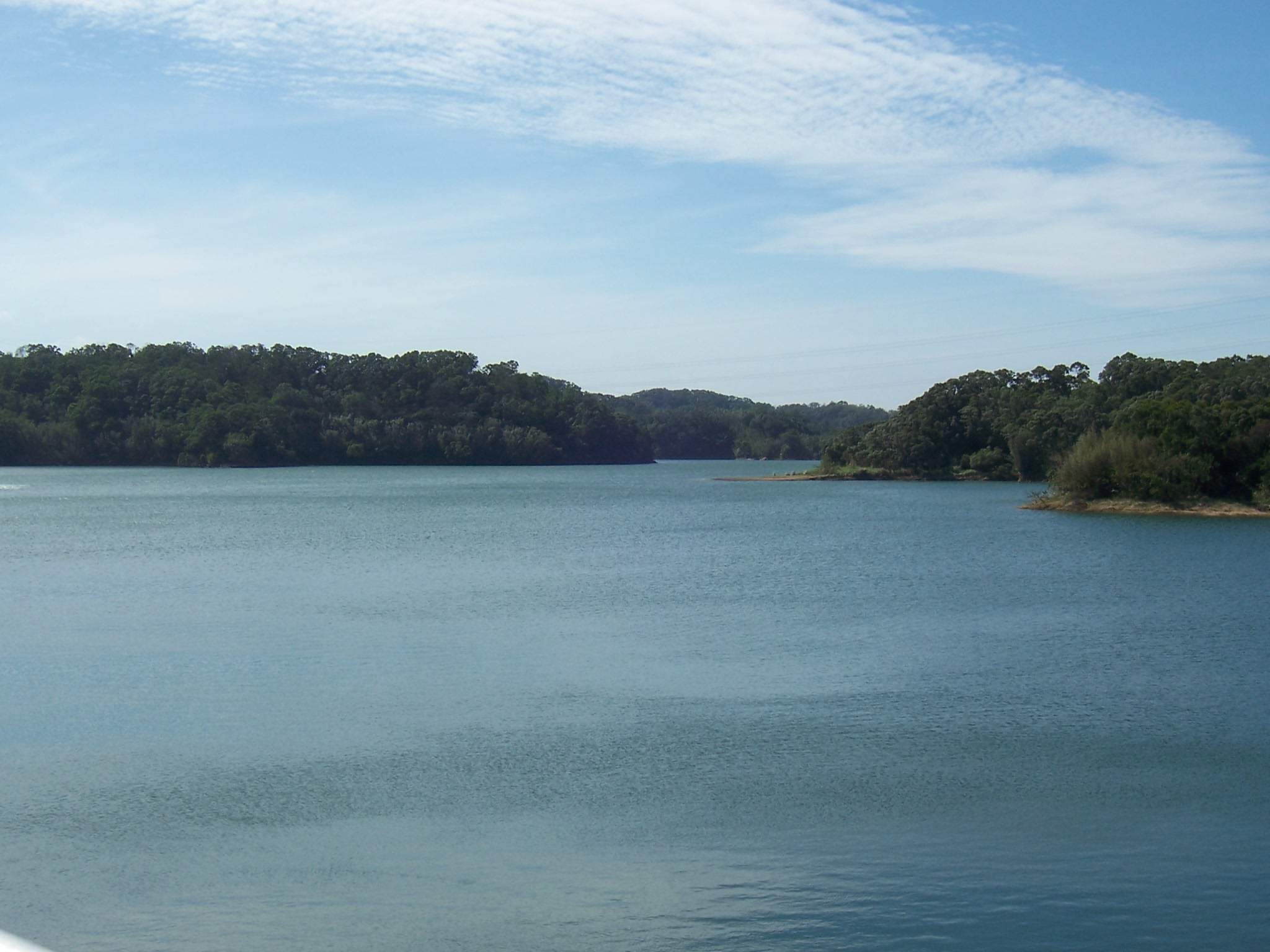
Yongheshan Reservoir in Sanwan Township

- Yongheshan Reservoir

== Notable natives ==
- Huang Yu-cheng, Minister of Hakka Affairs Council (2008-2014)
