= Tongluo =

Rural township in Miaoli County, Taiwan

Coordinates: 24°29′N 120°47′E

Tongluo Township 銅鑼鄉
- Rural township
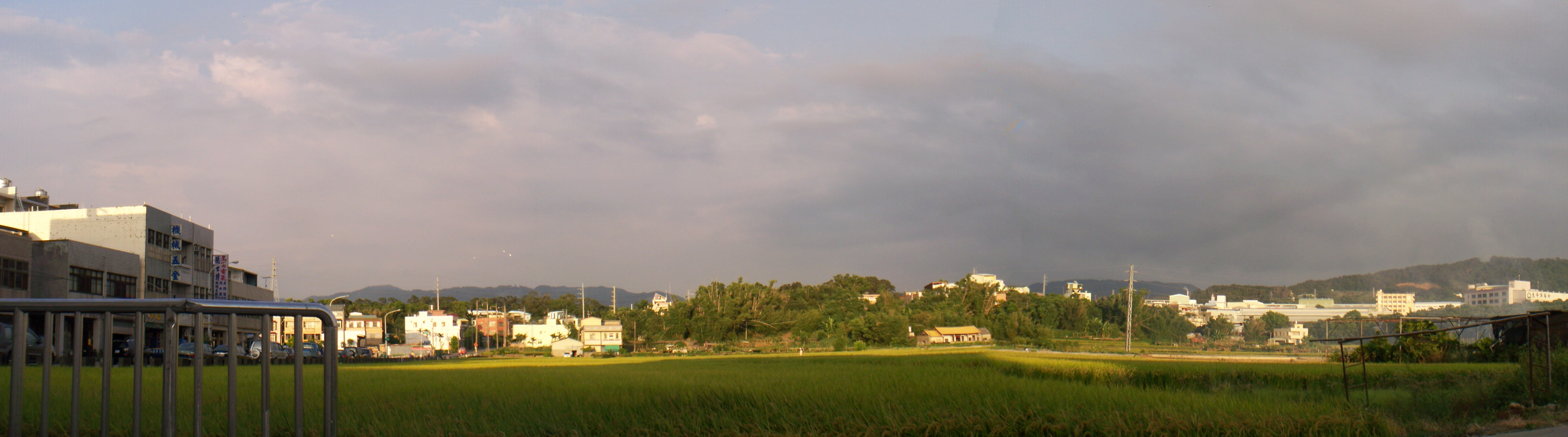

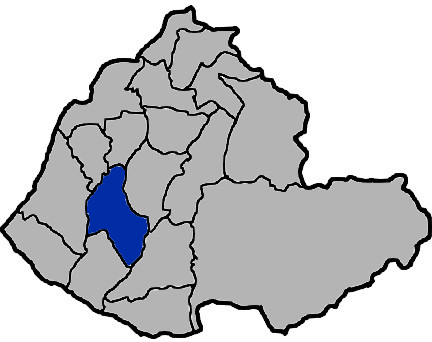
- Tongluo Township in Miaoli County
- Location: Miaoli County, Taiwan

Area
  - Total: 78 km^{2} (30 sq mi)

Population (September 2023)
  - Total: 16,563
  - Density: 210/km^{2} (550/sq mi)
- Website: www.tongluo.gov.tw (in Chinese)

Tongluo Township
- Chinese: 銅鑼鄉
- Hanyu Pinyin: Tóngluó Xiāng
- Wade–Giles: T'ung^{2}-lo^{2} Hsiang^{1}
- Pha̍k-fa-sṳ: Thùng-lò-hiông
- Hokkien POJ: Tâng-lô-hiong

Tongluo Township is a rural township in Miaoli County, Taiwan.

== Geography ==
- Area: 78.38 square kilometres (30.26 sq mi)
- Population: 16,563 (September 2023)

== Administrative divisions ==
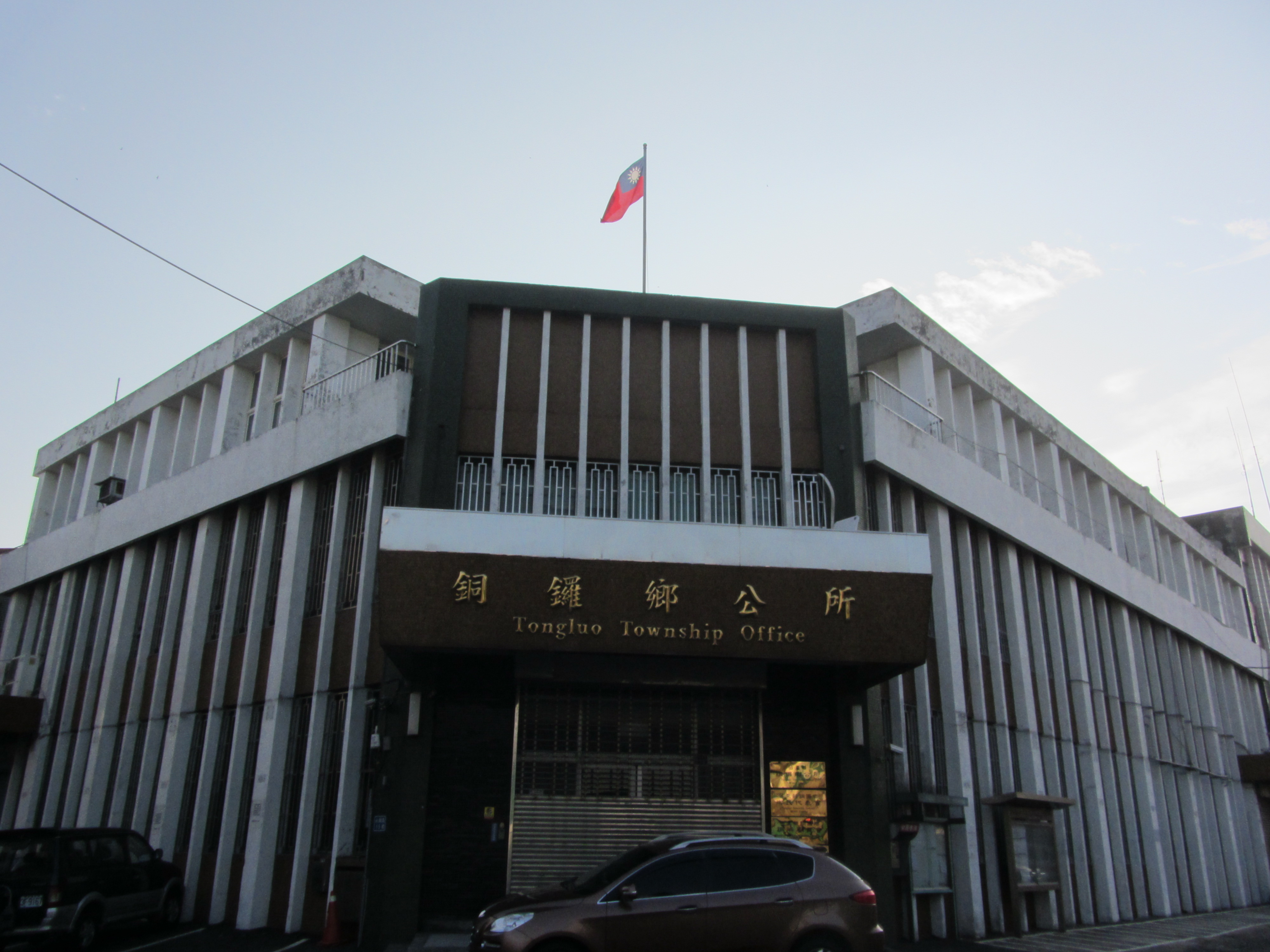
Tongluo Township office

The township comprises 10 villages: Chenglong, Fuxing, Jiuhu, Tongluo, Xinglong, Xinlong, Zhangshu, Zhaoyang, Zhongping and Zhusen.

== Politics ==
The township is part of Miaoli County Constituency I electoral district for Legislative Yuan.

== Economy ==
The township is the main producer of chrysanthemums in Taiwan.

== Tourist attractions ==
- Hakka Yard
- Miaoli Park
- Ramune Soda Factory

== Transportation ==
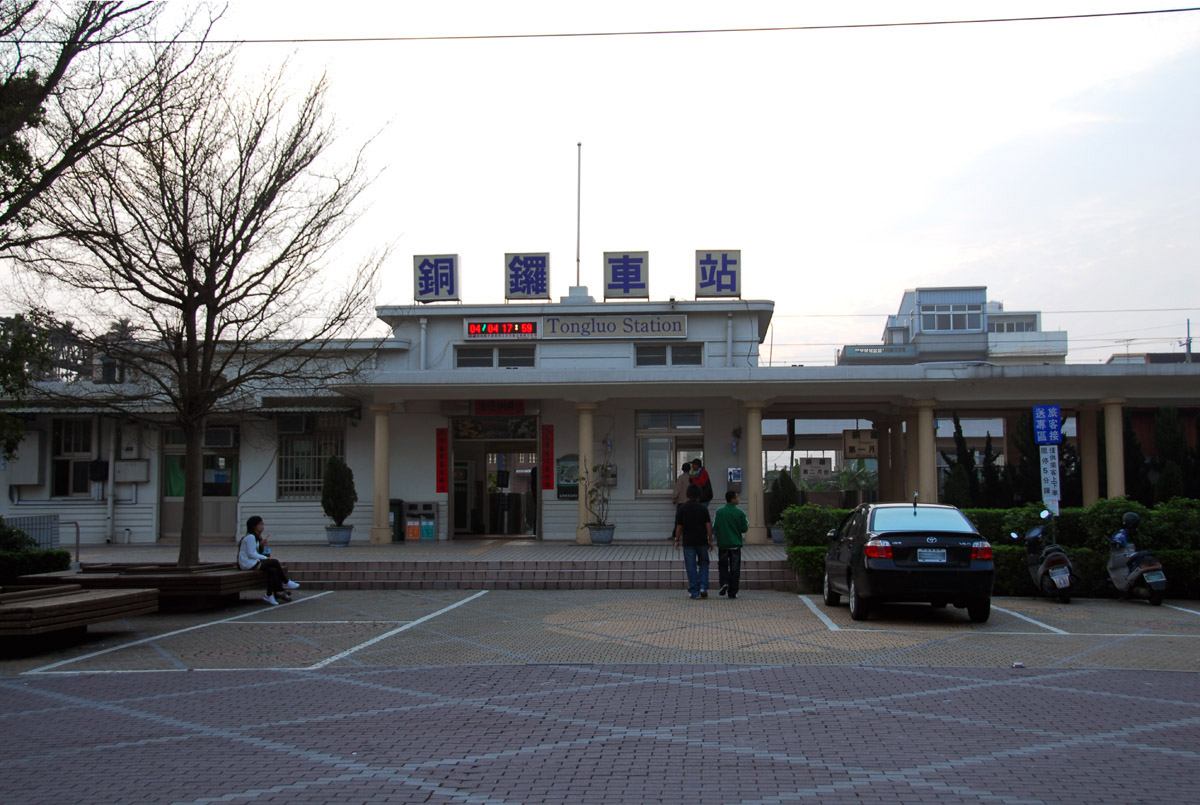
Tongluo Station

- Tongluo Station

== Notable natives ==
- Yeh Chu-lan, Vice Premier (2004-2005)
