= Shitan, Miaoli =

Rural township in Miaoli County, Taiwan

Coordinates: 24.523387°N 120.92337°E

Shitan Township 獅潭鄉 Shihtan
- Rural township
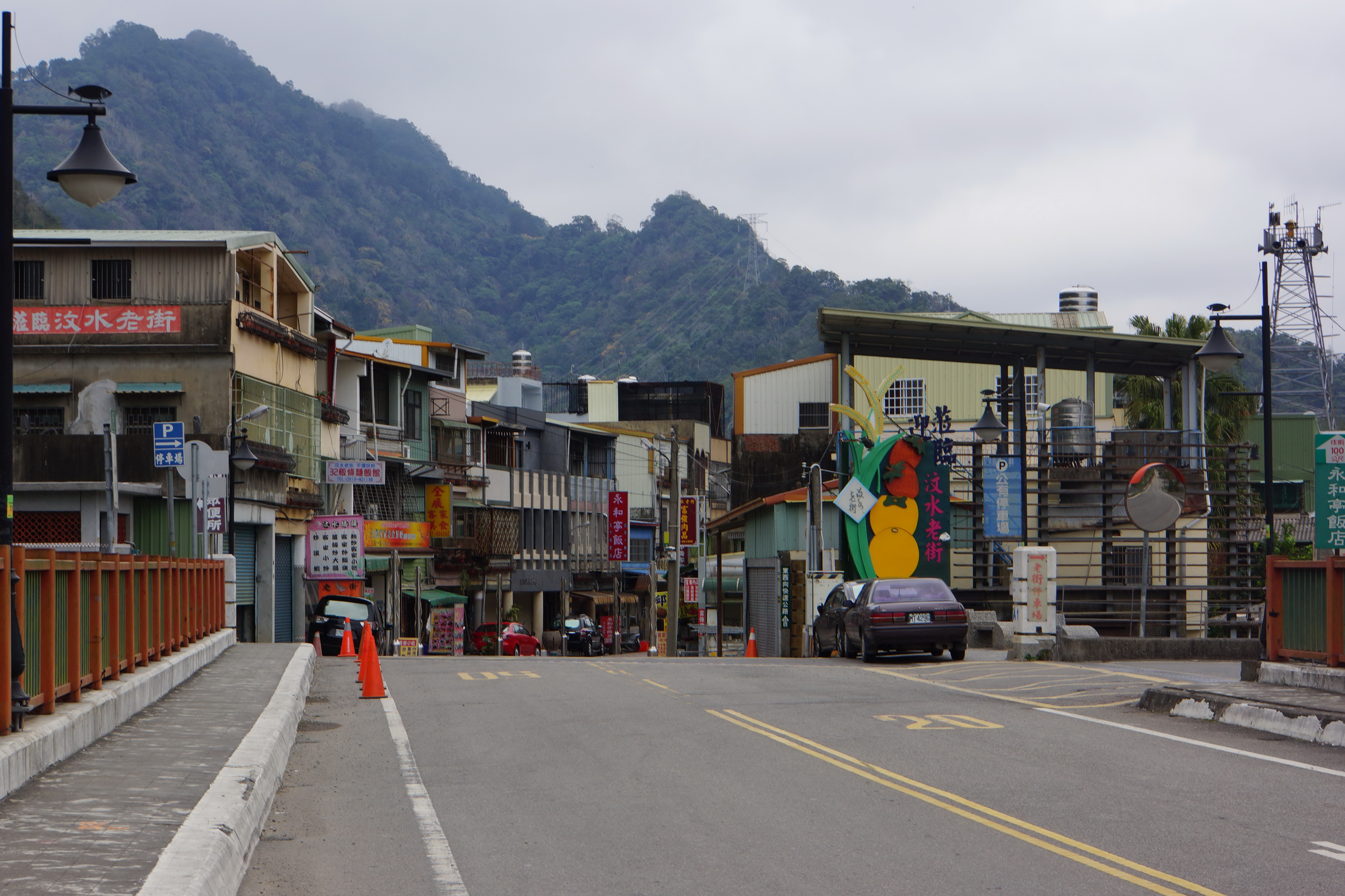

- Shihtan Township Office, Miaoli County

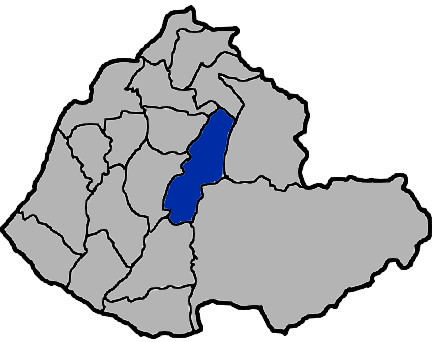
- Shitan Township in Miaoli County
- Location: Miaoli County, Taiwan

Area
  - Total: 79 km^{2} (31 sq mi)

Population (January 2023)
  - Total: 4,141
  - Density: 52/km^{2} (140/sq mi)
- Website: www.stan.gov.tw (in Chinese)

Shitan Township / Shihtan Township (Chinese: 獅潭鄉; Hanyu Pinyin: Shītán Xiāng; Tongyong Pinyin: Shihtán Siang) is a rural township in Miaoli County, Taiwan. It is located in a mountainous area with a mild, sub-tropical climate. Its rainy season is from May to September. Shitan's population was estimated to be 4,141 in January 2023.

== History ==
The area was occupied by native Taiwanese through the 19th Century with an economy strongly dependent upon hunting. In 1876 under Qing rule, the Chinese began to build bullock roads into the area. However it was not until the 1930s, during Japanese rule, that standardized roads began to be constructed. The first motor vehicle road was completed into Shitan in 1939, and regular bus service was started. However, by 1942 the bus service had ended because of fuel rationing.

== Administrative divisions ==
The township comprises seven villages: Boshou, Fenglin, Hexing, Xindian, Xinfeng, Yongxing and Zhumu.

== Politics ==
The township is part of Miaoli County Constituency II electoral district for Legislative Yuan.

== Culture ==
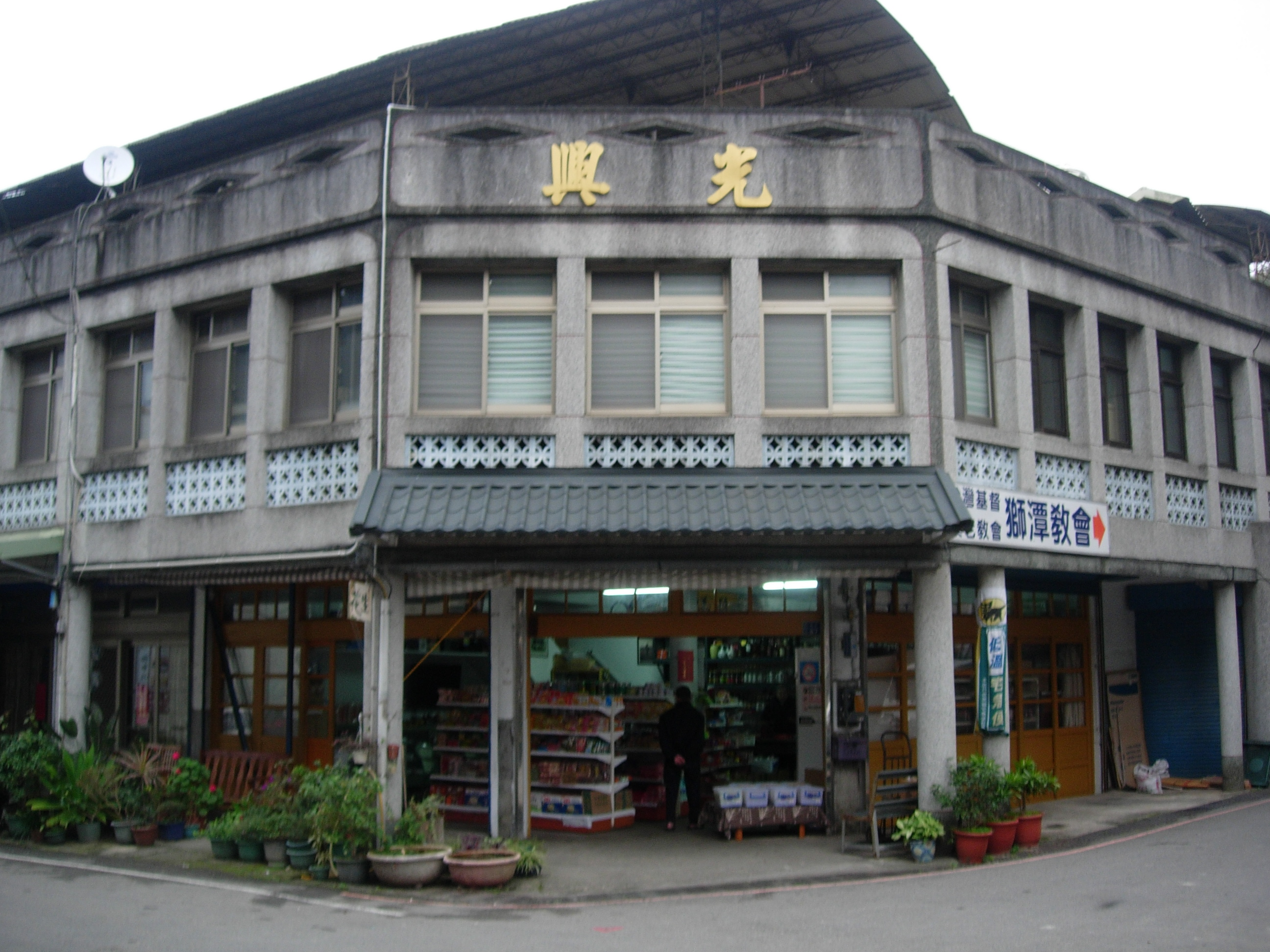
Shitan Hsintien Old Store

The Shitan Village Historic Museum preserves a Hakka dwelling from the Koxinga period. Other landmarks include Lingdong Temple, Shitan Presbyterian Church and Wenshui Old Street.

Local food specialities include Tea and Mesona chinensis (仙草), which is served as a hot, viscous drink, or curded and served over ice as a type of grass jelly.

== Education ==
Among the schools in Shitan are:

- 苗栗縣立獅潭國中
- 苗栗縣獅潭鄉獅潭國民小學 Shitan Elementary School in Chinese
- 苗栗縣獅潭鄉永興國民小學
- 苗栗縣獅潭鄉豐林國民小學

== Transportation ==
Shitan is served by provincial highways No. 3 and No. 72.

== Notable natives ==
- Yiong Con-ziin, Minister of the Hakka Affairs Council
