= Dapu incident =

Coordinates: 24.70970°N 120.89775°E

- Traditional Chinese: 大埔事件
- Simplified Chinese: 大埔事件
Transcriptions
Standard Mandarin
- Hanyu Pinyin: Dàbù Shìjiàn

The Dapu incident was an eminent domain case in the village of Dapu (大埔), Zhunan, Miaoli, Taiwan (ROC).

== Historical background ==
The power of eminent domain has been routinely abused in Taiwan for the sake of land speculation. The Miaoli county government has designated an area in Dapu Village for the construction of an industrial complex, which requires the expropriation of 156-hectares of land belonging to local residents. However, only 28 hectares of the expropriated lands are for industrial use, and most of the remaining area is for residential use.

== Incident ==
On 9 June 2010, excavators bulldozed and destroyed the Dapu villagers' crop two weeks before harvest in a dawn raid.

== Aftermath ==
Dapu incident urges the Taiwan authorities to revise its Land Expropriation Act in Taiwan now goes against the basic rights of people's livelihood. The initiation of land expropriation must be predicated on the public interest.

On 18 September 2013, a shoe was thrown at Liu Cheng-hung, Magistrate of Miaoli County, Taiwan, when he attempted to offer his condolences to the family of a man found dead in a water channel under a bridge at Dapu, Zhunan, Miaoli County. Supporters and relatives of the drowned man blamed Liu responsible for the man's death because the man's pharmacy was one of several structures destroyed by the Miaoli government earlier that July to make way for the construction of a new campus at the Hsinchu Science Park.

== See also ==
- Miaoli County
