= Hsu Yao-chang =

Taiwanese politician

- 徐耀昌
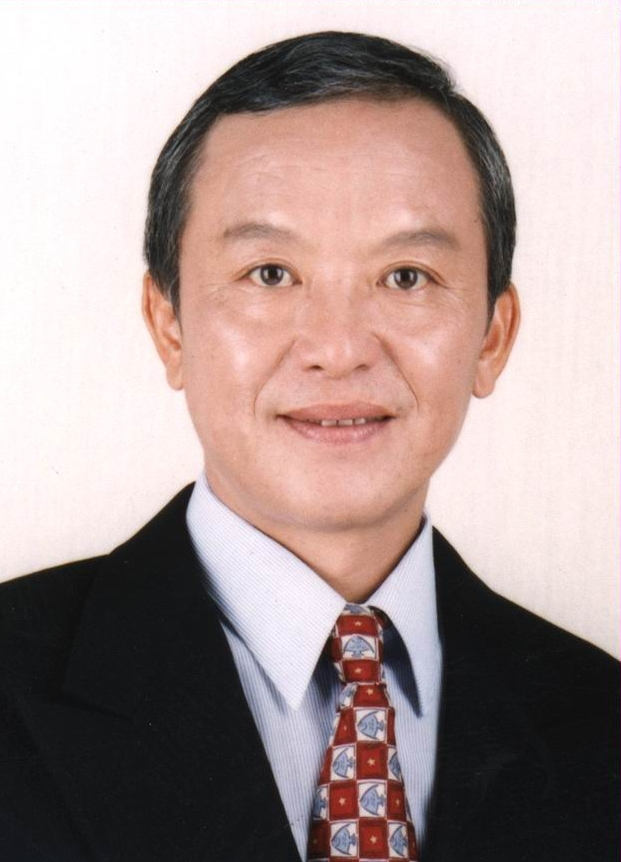
- Official portrait, 2008

11th Magistrate of Miaoli
- In office 25 December 2014 – 25 December 2022
- Deputy: Den Kui-chu
- Preceded by: Liu Cheng-hung
- Succeeded by: Chung Tung-chin

Member of the Legislative Yuan
- In office 1 February 2002 – 25 December 2014
- Succeeded by: Hsu Chih-jung
- Constituency: Miaoli County (until 2008) → Miaoli 2

9th Mayor of Toufen Town
- In office 3 January 1994 – 31 January 2002
- Preceded by: Chang Cheng-tai
- Succeeded by: Huang Kun-huo (acting)

Personal details
- Born: 30 June 1955 (age 71) Toufen, Miaoli County, Taiwan
- Party: Independent (since 2023)
- Other political affiliations: Kuomintang (until 2001; 2014–2023); People First Party (2001–2014)
- Education: Chin-Min Institute of Technology (BS); Chung Hua University (MA)

Hsu Yao-chang (Chinese: 徐耀昌; pinyin: Xú Yàochāng; Wade–Giles: Hsü^{2} Yao^{4}-chʻang^{1}; born 30 June 1955) is a Taiwanese politician. He represented Miaoli County in the Legislative Yuan from 2002 to 2014, when he was elected Magistrate of Miaoli County.

== Education ==
Hsu graduated from the Chin-Min Institute of Technology and completed his master's degree in industrial and commercial management at Chung Hua University.

== Political career ==
Hsu began his political career in 1994, as Toufen Township mayor affiliated with the Kuomintang. He left the KMT to represent the People First Party in the 2001 legislative elections. Hsu served as a legislator from 2002 to 2014, returning to the KMT to contest the Miaoli County magistracy in 2014. He declared his candidacy for the Miaoli County magistracy on 8 January 2014 at Toufen Elementary School in Toufen Township, Miaoli County. He was accompanied by his wife and other officials. Toufen Township chief Hsu Ting-chen said that Hsu would be able to expedite the development of the county due to his abundant experience and knowledge of the area.

== Miaoli County Magistracy ==
=== 2014 Miaoli County magistrate election ===
Hsu was elected as the Magistrate of Miaoli County on 29 November 2014, defeating Democratic Progressive Party candidate Wu Yi-chen.

2014 Miaoli County Magistrate Election Result
No.	Candidate	Party	Votes	Percentage
1	Hsu Yao-chang	KMT	147,547	46.59%
2	Kang Shi-ru (康世儒)	Independent	60,356	19.06%
3	Jiang Ming-xiu (江明修)	Independent	14,978	4.73%
4	Chen Shu-fen (陳淑芬)	Independent	2,137	0.67%
5	Zeng Guo-liang (曾國良)	Independent	1,807	0.57%
6	Wu Yi-chen	DPP	89,838	28.37%

=== 2016 Mainland China visit ===
In September 2016, Hsu with another seven magistrates and mayors from Taiwan visited Beijing, which were Chiu Ching-chun (Magistrate of Hsinchu County), Liu Cheng-ying (Magistrate of Lienchiang County), Yeh Hui-ching (Deputy Mayor of New Taipei City), Chen Chin-hu (Deputy Magistrate of Taitung County), Lin Ming-chen (Magistrate of Nantou County), Fu Kun-chi (Magistrate of Hualien County) and Wu Cherng-dean (Deputy Magistrate of Kinmen County). Their visit was aimed to reset and restart cross-strait relations after President Tsai Ing-wen took office on 20 May 2016. The eight local leaders reiterated their support of One-China policy under the 1992 consensus. They met with Taiwan Affairs Office Head Zhang Zhijun and Chairperson of the Chinese People's Political Consultative Conference Yu Zhengsheng.

=== 2018 Miaoli County magistrate election ===
The Kuomintang endorsed Hsu for a second term as Miaoli County magistrate in December 2017.

2018 Kuomintang Miaoli County magistrate primary results
Candidates	Place	Result
Hsu Yao-chang	Nominated	Walkover

2018 Miaoli County mayoral results
No.	Candidate	Party	Votes	Percentage
1	Zhu Tai-ping (朱泰平)	Independent	6,880	2.26%
2	Hsu Ting-zhen (徐定禎)	Independent	112,704	37.03%
3	Huang Yu-yen (黃玉燕)	Independent	9,030	2.97%
4	Hsu Yao-chang	Kuomintang	175,756	57.74%
Total voters			446,507	
Valid votes			304,370	
Invalid votes				
Voter turnout			68.17%	

Hsu was term-limited and ineligible for the Miaoli County magisterial post in the 2022 local election. The Kuomintang nominated Hsieh Fu-hung, who led the Irrigation and Water Conservancy Association and Irrigation Agency in Miaoli.

In August 2023, Hsu declared his support of a 2024 presidential bid by Terry Gou, and left the Kuomintang.
