= Toufen =

County-administered city in Miaoli County, Taiwan

Coordinates: 24.683209°N 120.907234°E

Toufen 頭份市 Tōfun
- County-administered city
- Toufen City
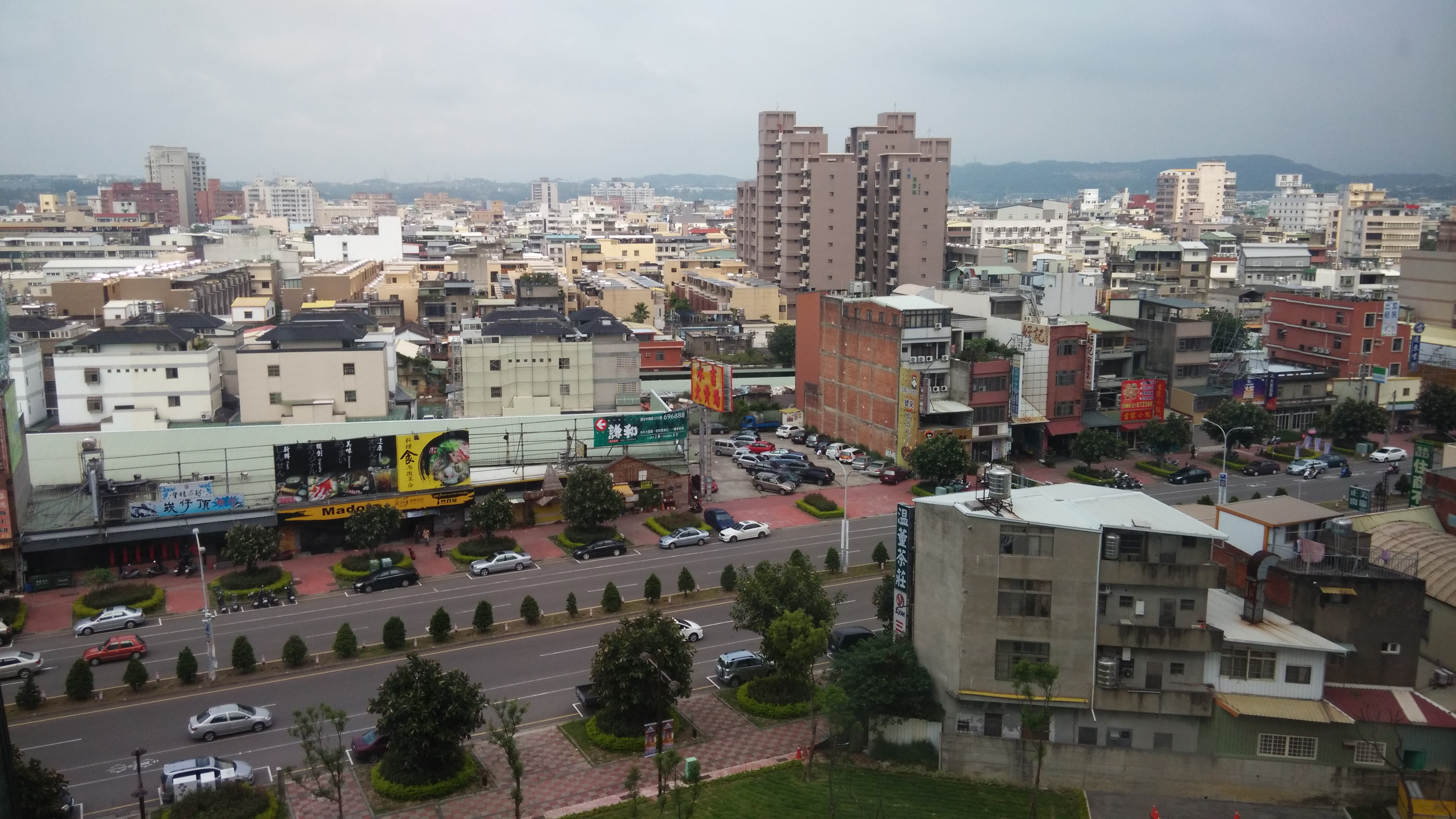

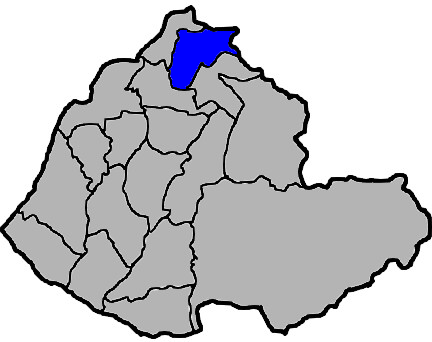
- Toufen within Miaoli County

- Location of Toufen in Taiwan
- Country: Republic of China (Taiwan)
- Province: Taiwan Province
- County: Miaoli

Area
  - Total: 53.3205 km^{2} (20.5872 sq mi)

Population (September 2023)
  - Total: 106,310
  - Density: 1,971/km^{2} (5,100/sq mi)
- Time zone: UTC+8 (CST)
- Postal code: 5
- Website: www.toufen.gov.tw (in Chinese)

Toufen City
- Traditional Chinese: 頭份市
- Simplified Chinese: 头份市
Transcriptions
Standard Mandarin
- Hanyu Pinyin: Tóufèn Shì
- Bopomofo: ㄊㄡˊ ㄈㄣˋ ㄕˋ
- Gwoyeu Romatzyh: Tourfenn Shyh
- Wade–Giles: Tʻou^{2}-fên^{4} Shih^{4}
- Tongyong Pinyin: Tóufèn Shìh
- MPS2: Tóufèn Shr̀
- IPA: [tʰǒʊ.fə̂n ʂɻ̩̂]
Hakka
- Pha̍k-fa-sṳ: Thèu-fun-sṳ
Southern Min
- Hokkien POJ: Thâu-hūn-chhī
- Tâi-lô: Thâu-hūn-tshī

Toufen (Hakka PFS: Thèu-fun; Hokkien POJ: Thâu-hūn) is a county-administered city in northern Miaoli County Taiwan, formerly known as "Toufen Township". Its city centre forms a continuous urban area with Zhunan.

With a population of approximately 107,000, it is the most populous administrative division in Miaoli County. The majority of the residents are of Hakka ethnicity, accounting for about 90% of the population. Based on a sampling survey using the "multiple identification" method, the estimated ratio of Hakka to Hoklo residents is around 8:2.

== History ==
In 2007, there was a revitalization project for the community houses in the city which was funded by Council of Cultural Affairs and private sectors which turned the buildings into a museum of chronicling life in the 1950s and 1960s. On 5 October 2015, Toufen was upgraded from an urban township to a county-administered city.

== Geography ==
Toufen has an area of 53.3029 km^{2} (20.5804 sq mi). Surrounding the city are Miaoli County's Zhunan, Zaoqiao and Sanwan townships to the northwest/west, southwest and southeast, respectively, and Hsinchu County to the northeast and east. As of September 2023, its total population was estimated at 106,310, including 53,449 males and 52,861 females.

Terrain

Toufen City is located in the northern part of Miaoli County, in the foothill area at the border between Hsinchu and Miaoli counties. It borders Baoshan Township of Hsinchu County to the north, Zhunan Township to the northwest and west, Emei Township of Hsinchu County to the northeast, Sanwan Township to the east, and Zaoqiao Township across the Nangang River to the south. The city lies in the midstream valley region of the Zhonggang River, with terrain mainly consisting of plains and hills. The plains area is part of the Zhunan alluvial plain in the middle to lower reaches of the Zhonggang River.

== Administrative divisions ==
The city comprises the following villages: Chenggong, Douhuan, Gexing, Guangxing, Heping, Houzhuang, Jianguo, Jianshan, Jianxia, Lankeng, Liutung, Luzhu, Minquan, Minsheng, Minzu, Pantao, Renai, Shangpu, Shangxing, Shanhu, Shanxia, Tianliao, Tongzhuang, Toufen, Tuniu, Wenhua, Xiaxing, Xinglong, Xinhua, Xinyi, Zhongxiao and Zijiang.

== Tourist attractions ==
- Toufen Backyard Garden
- Shang Shun Mall
- Luzhunan Historical House
- Toufen Jianguo Night Market

== Transportation ==
Toufen is accessible by Zhunan Station of Taiwan Railway located in the neighboring Zhunan Township. The Taiwan High Speed Rail passes through the central part of the city, but no station is currently planned.

Toufen is also served by Freeway 1, Provincial Highways 1, 1B, 3, 13, 13A, and County Routes 124, 124A, and 124C.

== Notable natives ==
- Hsieh Chin-ting, Magistrate of Miaoli County (1981–1989)
- Hsu Yao-chang, Magistrate of Miaoli County

== Climate ==
Climate data for Toufen (Zhunan) (2008–2020 normals, extremes 2008–present)
Month	Jan	Feb	Mar	Apr	May	Jun	Jul	Aug	Sep	Oct	Nov	Dec	Year
Record high °C (°F)	29.8 (85.6)	32.2 (90.0)	32.5 (90.5)	34.6 (94.3)	35.0 (95.0)	36.7 (98.1)	37.9 (100.2)	37.6 (99.7)	36.4 (97.5)	36.4 (97.5)	32.4 (90.3)	28.6 (83.5)	37.9 (100.2)
Mean daily maximum °C (°F)	19.3 (66.7)	19.4 (66.9)	21.7 (71.1)	25.6 (78.1)	28.7 (83.7)	31.5 (88.7)	32.8 (91.0)	32.4 (90.3)	31.2 (88.2)	28.4 (83.1)	25.3 (77.5)	20.8 (69.4)	26.4 (79.6)
Daily mean °C (°F)	15.6 (60.1)	15.7 (60.3)	17.9 (64.2)	21.7 (71.1)	25.2 (77.4)	28.0 (82.4)	29.2 (84.6)	28.7 (83.7)	27.4 (81.3)	24.5 (76.1)	21.5 (70.7)	17.2 (63.0)	22.7 (72.9)
Mean daily minimum °C (°F)	12.7 (54.9)	13.0 (55.4)	14.8 (58.6)	18.5 (65.3)	22.2 (72.0)	25.2 (77.4)	26.2 (79.2)	25.7 (78.3)	24.3 (75.7)	21.6 (70.9)	18.5 (65.3)	14.2 (57.6)	19.7 (67.6)
Record low °C (°F)	3.5 (38.3)	4.2 (39.6)	7.9 (46.2)	9.0 (48.2)	15.2 (59.4)	17.9 (64.2)	20.2 (68.4)	20.9 (69.6)	19.7 (67.5)	15.0 (59.0)	6.2 (43.2)	6.1 (43.0)	3.5 (38.3)
Average precipitation mm (inches)	61.3 (2.41)	110.6 (4.35)	138.1 (5.44)	150.9 (5.94)	235.5 (9.27)	267.3 (10.52)	124.7 (4.91)	178.9 (7.04)	138.0 (5.43)	35.5 (1.40)	39.9 (1.57)	48.6 (1.91)	1,529.3 (60.19)
Average precipitation days	8.0	9.3	11.6	11.7	10.7	10.1	7.1	9.9	7.5	3.8	4.4	5.9	100
Average relative humidity (%)	79.3	82.5	80.9	79.9	81.3	78.6	74.7	78.0	76.2	73.8	78.1	77.3	78.4
Source 1: Central Weather Administration
Source 2: Atmospheric Science Research and Application Databank (precipitation 1991–2020, precipitation days and humidity 2000–2024)
