= Touwu =

Rural township in Miaoli County, Taiwan

Coordinates: 24°35′N 120°51′E

Touwu Township 頭屋郷
- Rural township
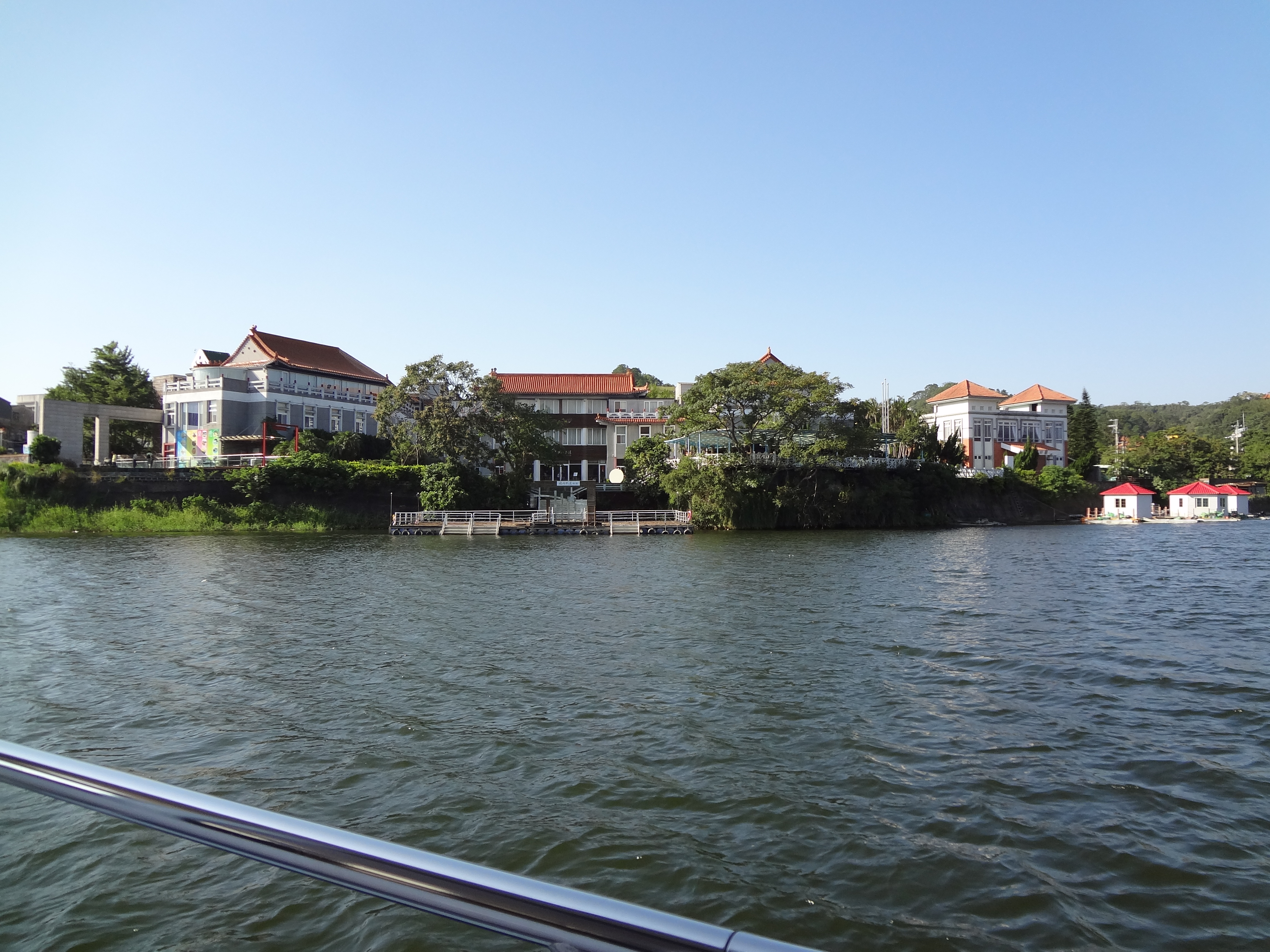

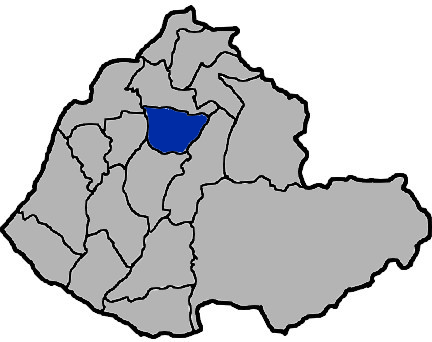
- Touwu Township in Miaoli County
- Location: Miaoli County, Taiwan

Area
  - Total: 53 km^{2} (20 sq mi)

Population (September 2023)
  - Total: 9,835
  - Density: 190/km^{2} (480/sq mi)
- Website: www.touwu.gov.tw (in Chinese)

Touwu Township
- Chinese: 頭屋郷
- Hanyu Pinyin: Tóuwū Xiāng
- Wade–Giles: T'ou^{2}-wu^{1} Hsiang^{1}
- Pha̍k-fa-sṳ: Thèu-vuk-hiông
- Hokkien POJ: Thâu-ok-hiong

Touwu Township is a rural township in north-western Miaoli County, Taiwan.

== Geography ==
- Area: 52.45 square kilometres (20.25 sq mi)
- Population: 9,835 (September 2023)

== Administrative divisions ==
The township comprises eight villages: Beikeng, Feifeng, Mingde, Mingfeng, Qudong, Shitan, Touwu and Xiangshan.

== Politics ==
The township is part of Miaoli County Constituency II electoral district for Legislative Yuan.

== Tourist attractions ==
- Guanyin Temple
- Mingde Reservoir behind Mingde Dam
- Rihsin Island

== Notable natives ==
- Chang Chiu-hua, Magistrate of Miaoli County (1989–1993)
- Rai Hau-min, President of Judicial Yuan (2010–2016)
