= Dactylispa latipennis =

Scientific classification
- Kingdom: Animalia
- Phylum: Arthropoda
- Clade: Pancrustacea
- Class: Insecta
- Order: Coleoptera
- Suborder: Polyphaga
- Infraorder: Cucujiformia
- Family: Chrysomelidae
- Genus: Dactylispa
- Species: D. latipennis

Binomial name
- Dactylispa latipennis Chûjô, 1933

Species of beetle

Dactylispa latipennis is a species of beetle of the family Chrysomelidae. It is found in Taiwan.

== Life history ==
The recorded host plants for this species are Quercus glauca, Quercus salicina, Cyclobalanopsis sessilifolia, Castanopsis uraiana, Lithocarpus lepidocarpus, Lithocarpus harlandii, Lithocarpus dodonaeifolius, Lithocarpus formosanus, Lithocarpus hancei, Lithocarpus kawakamii, Quercus serrata, Quercus tatakaensis, and Quercus variabilis.
