= Taiwan subtropical evergreen forests =

Ecoregion in Taiwan

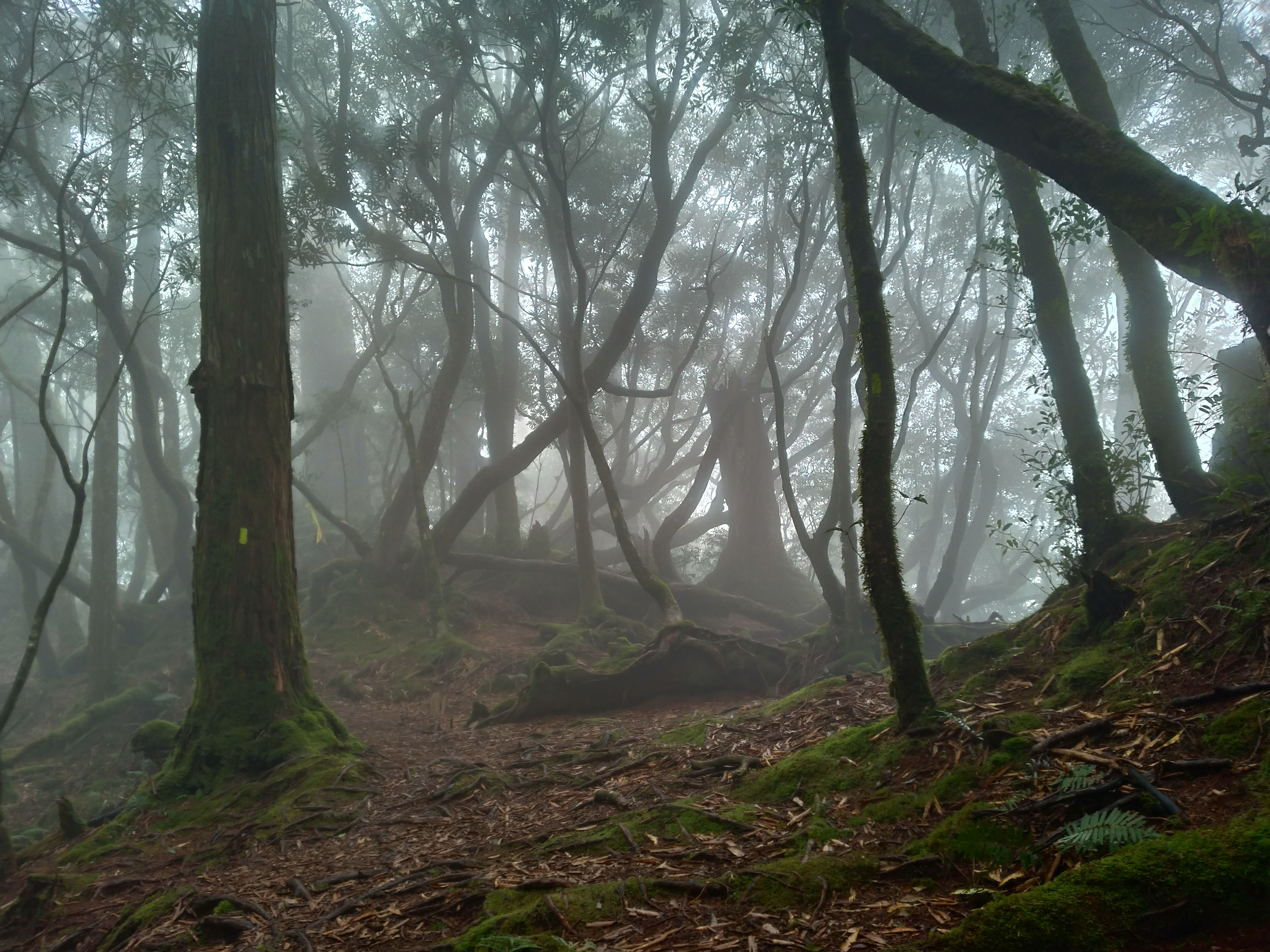
- forest in Chatianshan Nature Reserve

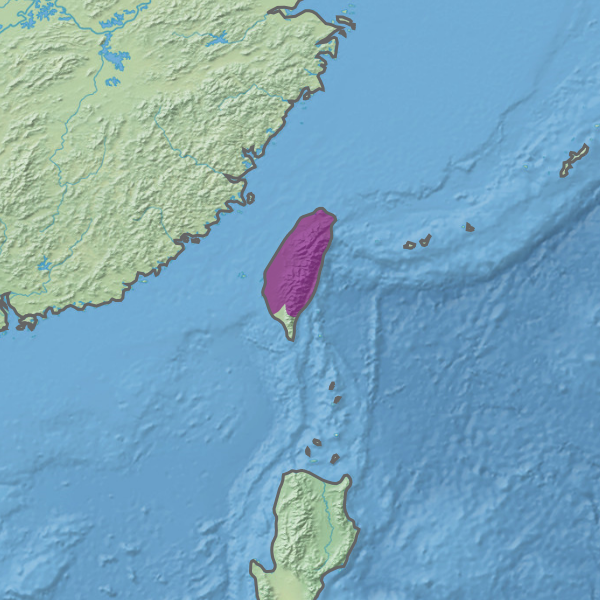
- Ecoregion territory (in purple)

Ecology
- Realm: Indomalayan realm
- Biome: tropical and subtropical moist broadleaf forests
- Borders: South Taiwan monsoon rain forests

Geography
- Area: 33,192 km^{2} (12,816 sq mi)
- Country: Taiwan
- Coordinates: 22°30′N 120°45′E

Conservation
- Protected: 6,746 km^{2} (20%)

The Taiwan subtropical evergreen forests is an ecoregion that covers most of the island of Taiwan, with the exception of the southern tip of the island, which constitutes the South Taiwan monsoon rain forests ecoregion. The island's concentrated steep mountains host a range of forest types, from subtropical forests in the lowlands to temperate and alpine or montane forests.

== Flora ==
The coastal plains and lower elevations are covered by evergreen laurel-Castanopsis forests, dominated by Chinese Cryptocarya (Cryptocarya chinensis) and Castanopsis hystrix, with scattered stands of the subtropical pine Pinus massoniana. At higher elevations, Japanese blue oak (Quercus glauca) replaces Cryptocarya and Castanopsis as the dominant tree.

As elevation further increases, the evergreen broadleaf trees are gradually replaced by deciduous broadleaf trees and conifers. Above 3,000 meters, deciduous broadleaf trees like Formosan alder (Alnus formosana) and maple (Acer spp.) mix with Chinese hemlock (Tsuga chinensis) and Chinese Douglas-fir (Pseudotsuga sinensis). At the highest elevations, subalpine forests are dominated by conifers, including Chinese hemlock (Tsuga chinensis), Taiwan spruce (Picea morrisonicola), and Taiwan fir (Abies kawakamii).

== Fauna ==
- Mammals: There are sixty types of species of animal in Taiwan.
- Birds: There are over 500 species of birds. The migratory birds in Taiwan are famous all over the world.
- Reptiles: There are ninety kinds of reptiles.
- Amphibians: There are over thirty species of amphibians.
- Fishes: There are around 150 kinds of fishes. This excludes the sea fishes.
- Insects: There are 17,600 kinds of insects that have been already recognized and named in Taiwan.
- Butterflies: There are 400 kinds of butterflies.

There are some rare animal species in Taiwan that are found nowhere else or otherwise in less numbers. Of particular note are: the Swinhoe's Pheasant and the Mikado Pheasant, which are almost extinct in nearby regions. The Formosan rock macaque, a species of monkey, is found only in Taiwan.

== Protected areas ==
20.34% of the ecoregion is in protected areas. Protected areas include:

- Shei-pa National Park
- Taijiang National Park
- Taroko National Park
- Yangmingshan National Park
- Yushan National Park

== See also ==
- Temperate rainforest
