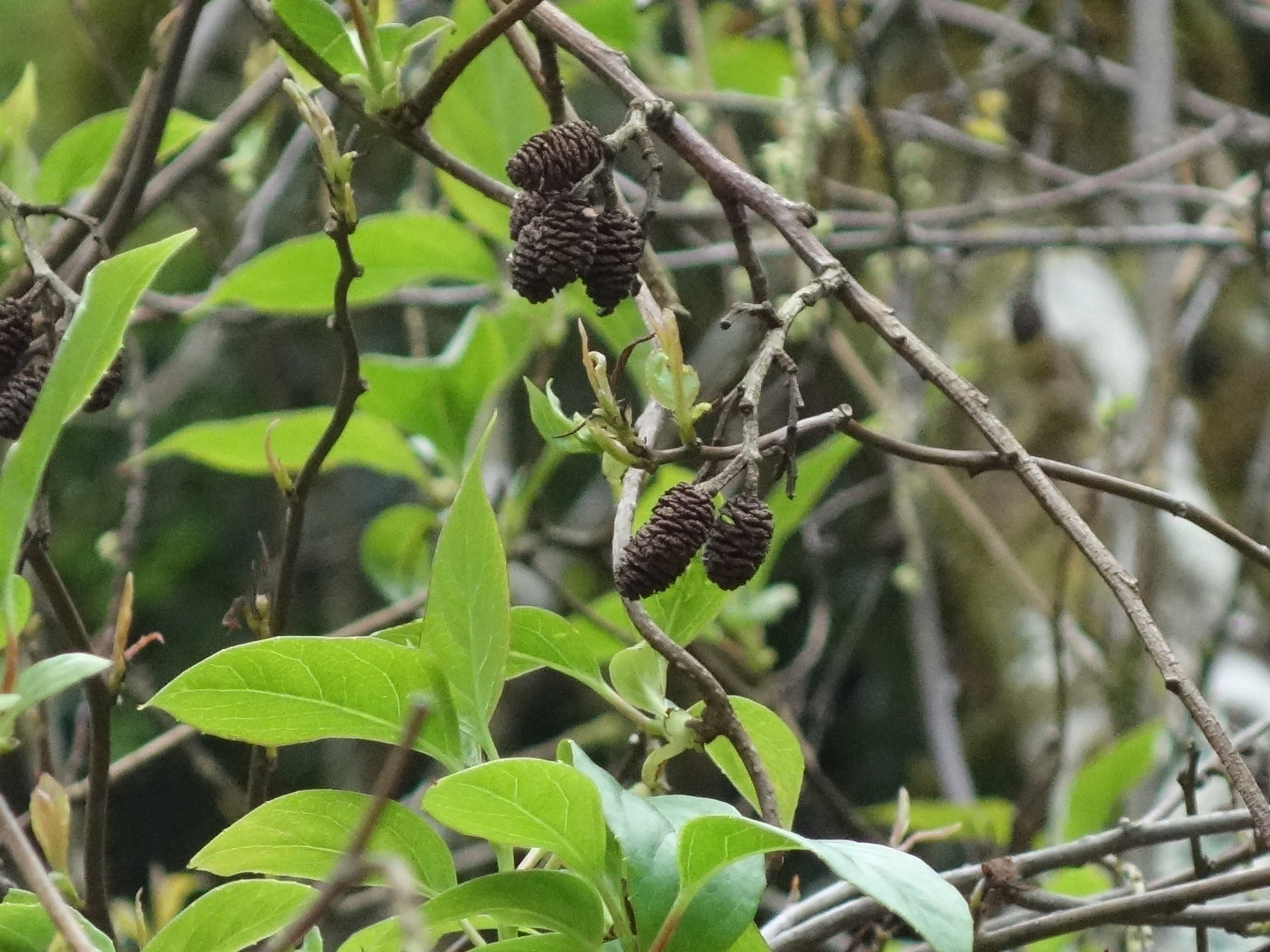
- Leaves and female infructescences

Conservation status
- Least Concern (IUCN 3.1)

Scientific classification
- Kingdom: Plantae
- Clade: Embryophytes
- Clade: Tracheophytes
- Clade: Angiosperms
- Clade: Eudicots
- Clade: Rosids
- Order: Fagales
- Family: Betulaceae
- Genus: Alnus
- Subgenus: Alnus subg. Clethropsis
- Species: A. formosana

Binomial name
- Alnus formosana (Burkill) Makino

Synonyms
- Alnus maritima (Marshall) Nuttall var. formosana Burkill; Alnus japonica (Thunberg) Steudel var. formosana Callier

= Alnus formosana =

Formosan alder

Species of tree

Alnus formosana, the Formosan alder, is a species of alder endemic to Taiwan. It is a medium-sized tree, up to 20 metres (66 ft) in height and 40 centimetres (16 in) in trunk diameter.

== Description ==
The formosan alder is a trees up to 20 meters in height with dark gray-brown bark. The petiole is 1.2-2.2 cm, slender; leaves elliptic or oblong-lanceolate, rarely ovate-oblong, 6-12 × 2–5 cm, hairy in the axils of lateral veins beneath, almost hairless above, rounded or broadly cuneate base, irregularly minutely serrated margin, acuminate or acute apex; lateral veins 6 or 7 on each side of the midrib. It has one female inflorescence, or 2-4 in a cluster, ellipsoid, 1-2.5 cm; peduncle 3–5 mm.

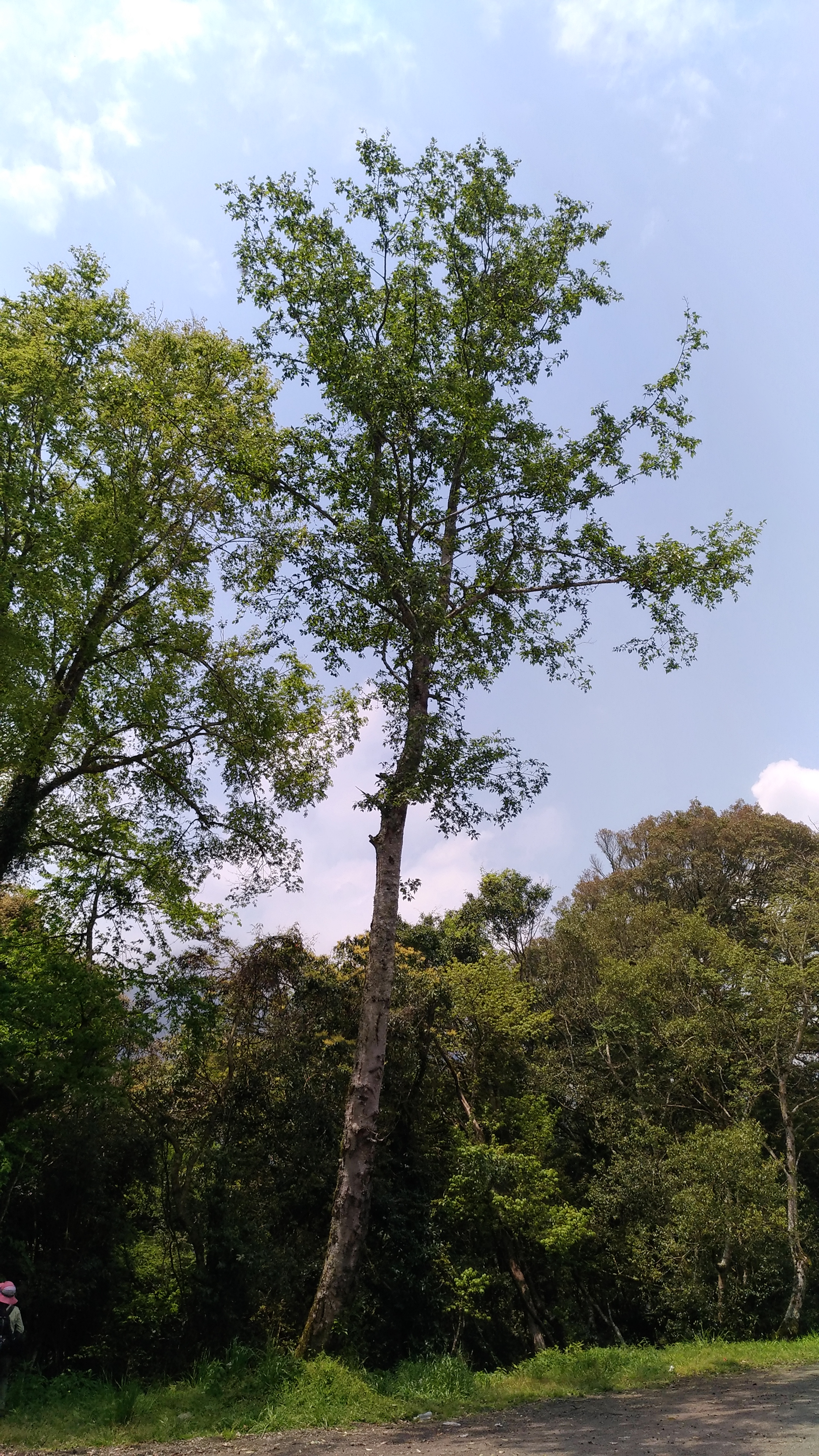
Form

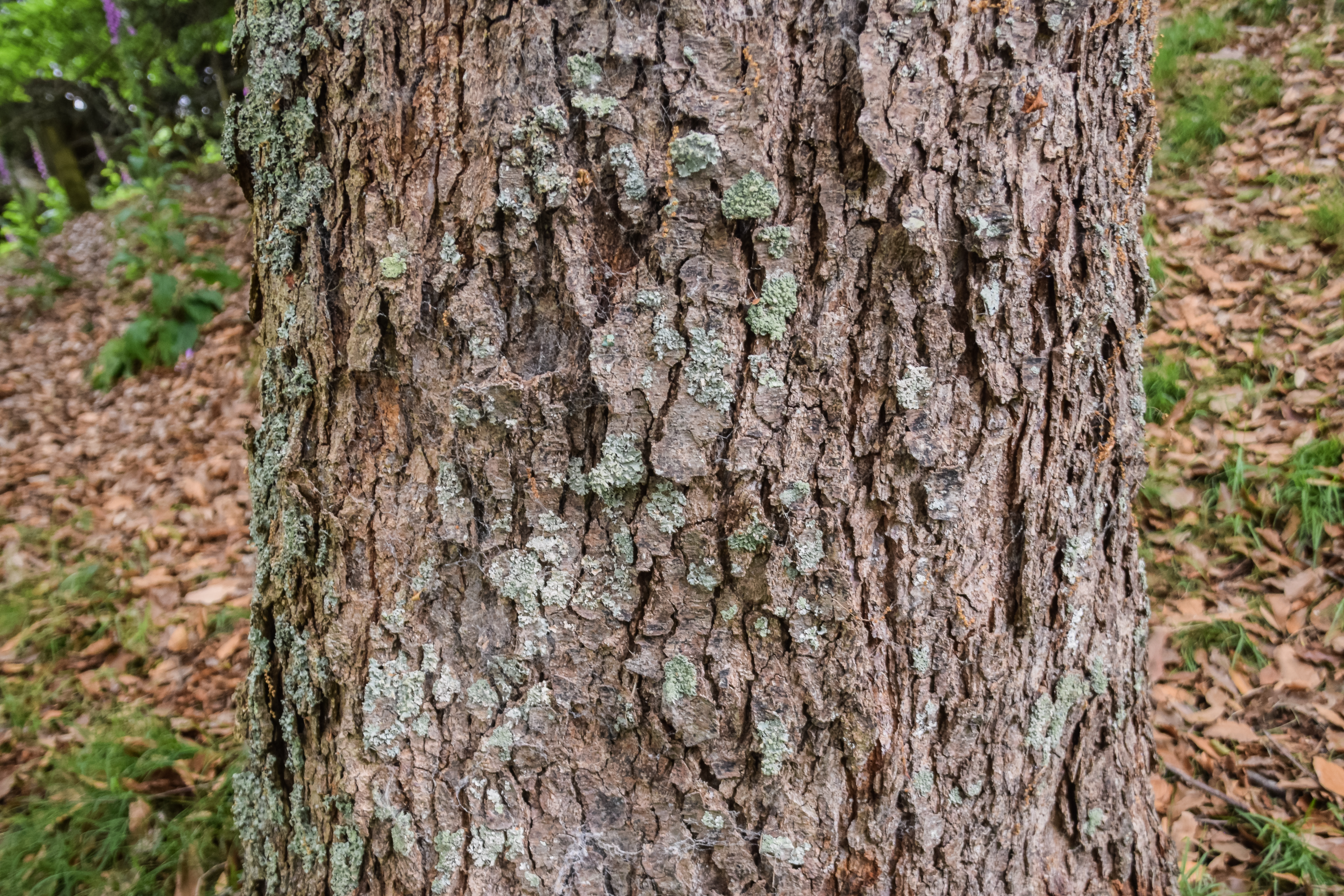
Bark

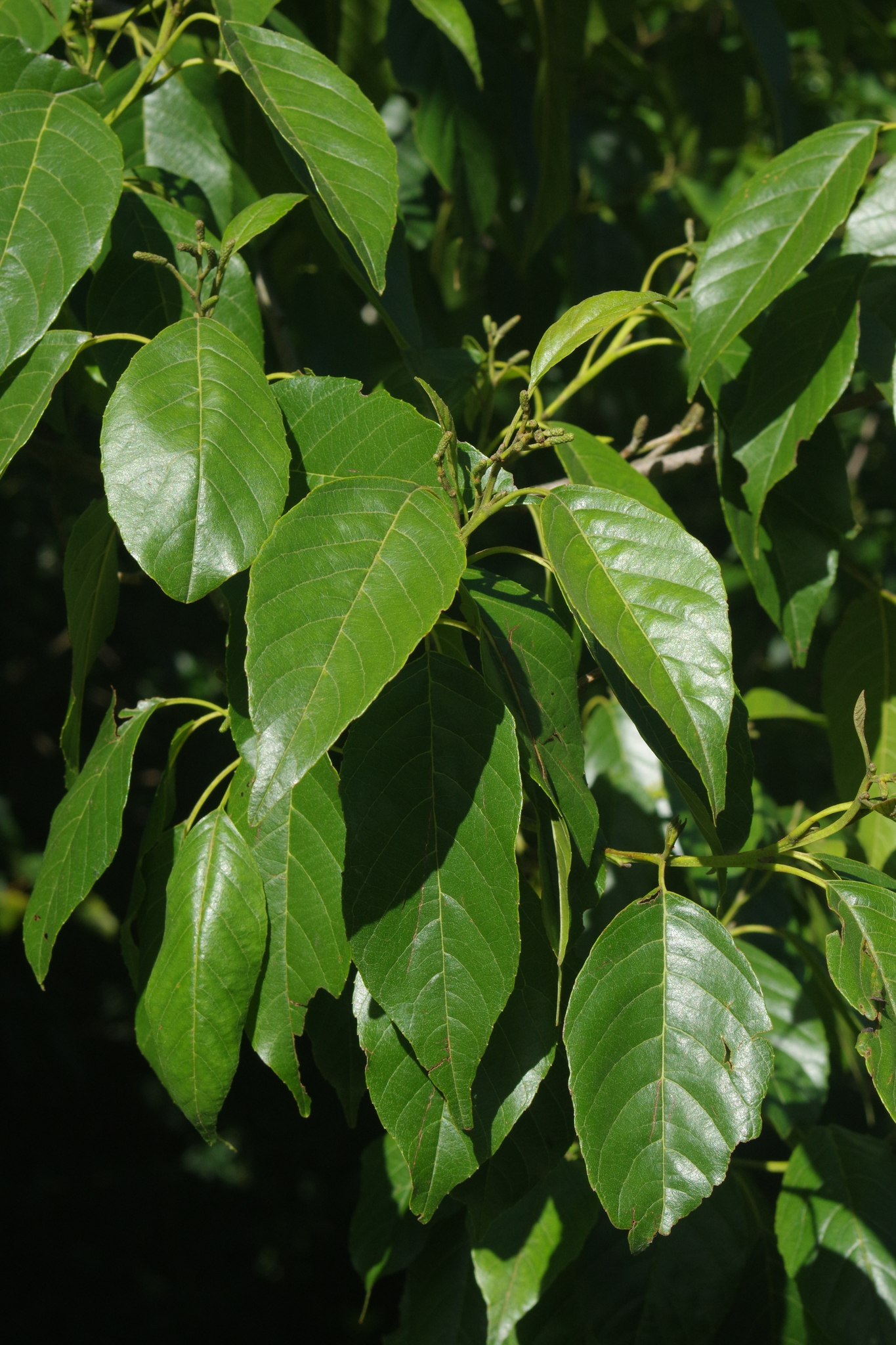
Leaves

== Distribution and habitat ==
It is found in Taiwan. It is a common species growing on riverbanks from near sea level to 2,900 metres (9,500 ft). It is commonly found in disturbed habitats as a pioneer species.

== Ecology ==
Alnus formosana flowers between May–June, fruiting between July–September.

== Uses ==
This tree is used for soil improvement. It also finds use in gardens and as a windbreak. The tree trunks is also used in paper pulping and cultivating snow fungus and shiitake.

The Atayal people uses A. formosana as a cover crop after clearing a new field, the traditional wisdom being that the soil becomes rich when it is cut cleared again in 10 to 15 years. It is also used in the Pas-ta'ai ritual of the Saisiyat people.

Early Han settlers of Taiwan name some places after the occurrence of the plant, the belief being that its occurrence is linked to ground collapse.
