= Nanzhuang Old Street =

Street in Nanzhuang, Miaoli County, Taiwan

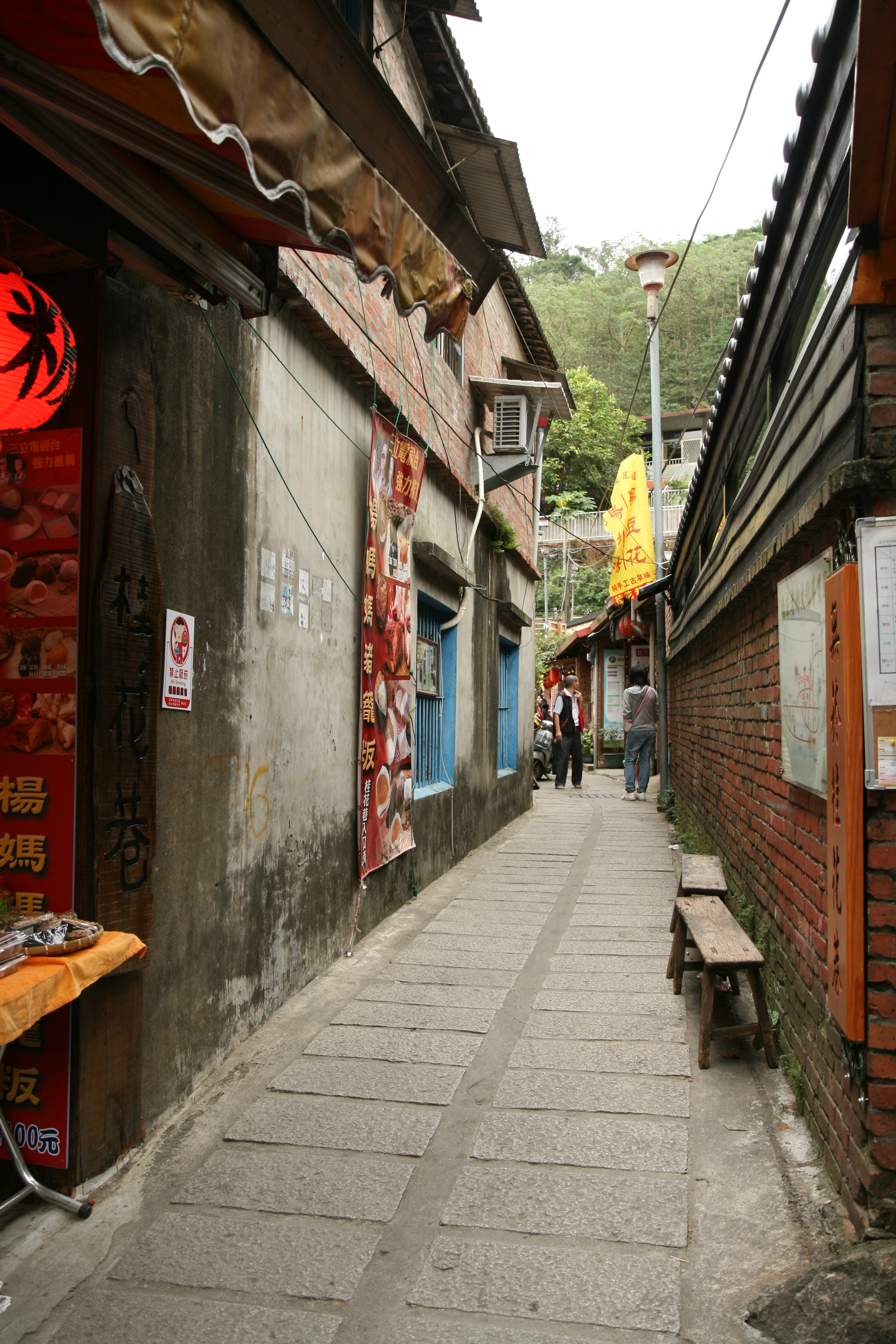

- Location within Miaoli County
- Native name: 南庄老街 (Chinese)
- Type: street
- Location: Nanzhuang, Miaoli County, Taiwan
- Coordinates: 24°35′57.7″N 120°59′57.5″E

The Nanzhuang Old Street or Osmanthus Alley (Chinese: 南庄老街; pinyin: Nánzhuāng Lǎojiē) is an old street in Nanzhuang Township, Miaoli County, Taiwan.

== Name ==
The street is also called Osmanthus Alley due to the fact that it is famous for its osmanthus wine.

== History ==
The street was the business center of the olden days of the town when it prospered due to the booming of lumber and mining industries within the area. The area however faced a downturn with the declining of those industries.

== See also ==
- List of roads in Taiwan
- List of tourist attractions in Taiwan
