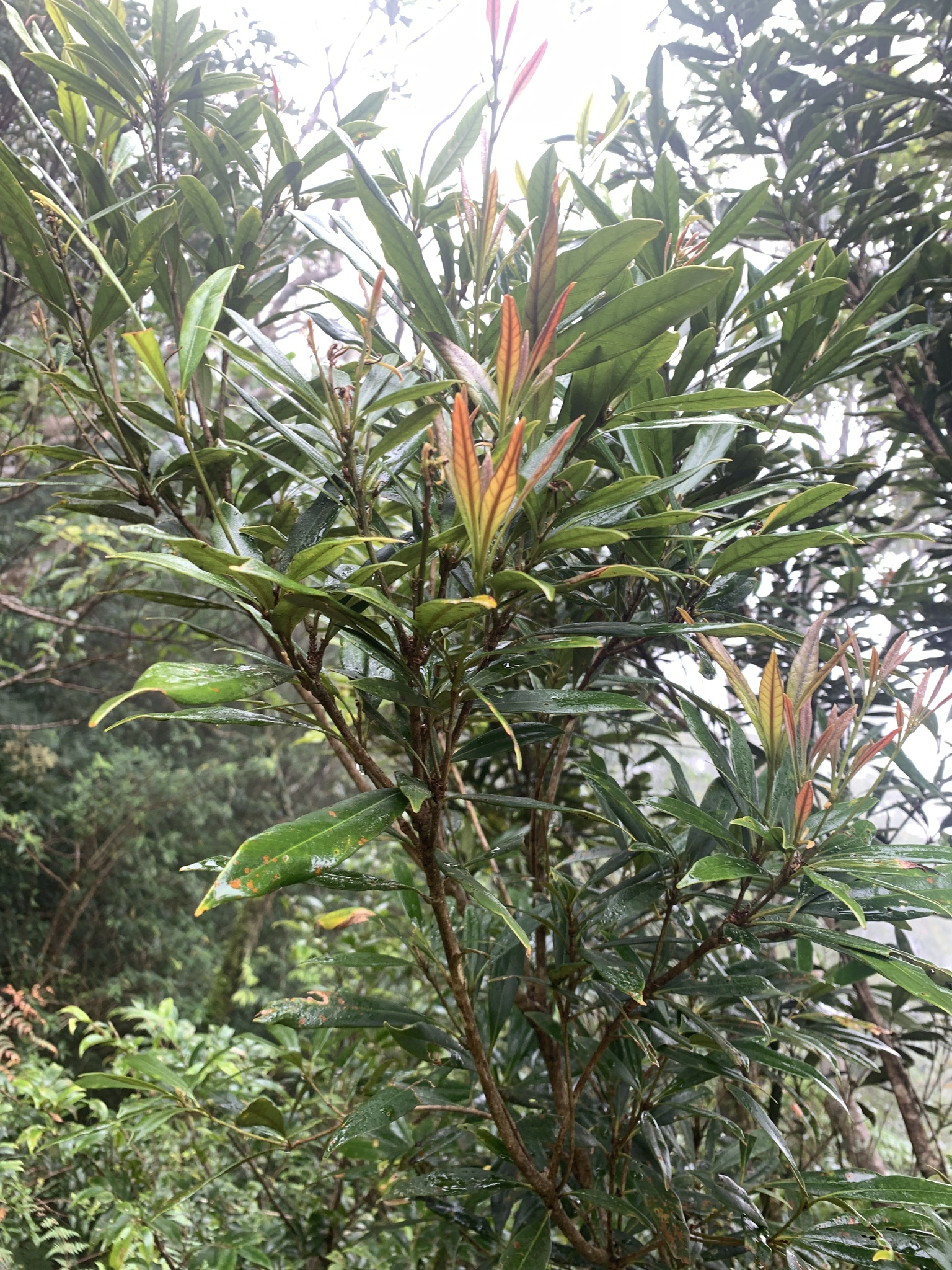
- In Taitung County, Taiwan

Conservation status
- Endangered (IUCN 2.3)

Scientific classification
- Kingdom: Plantae
- Clade: Tracheophytes
- Clade: Angiosperms
- Clade: Eudicots
- Clade: Rosids
- Order: Fagales
- Family: Fagaceae
- Genus: Lithocarpus
- Species: L. dodonaeifolius

Binomial name
- Lithocarpus dodonaeifolius (Hayata) Hayata

Synonyms
- Quercus dodonaeifolia Hayata; Synaedrys formosana f. dodonaeifolia (Hayata) Kudô

= Lithocarpus dodonaeifolius =

Species of tree

Lithocarpus dodonaeifolius is a species of tree in the family Fagaceae. L. dodonaeifolius is a medium-sized tree, up to 9 m (30 ft) tall. It is endemic to Taiwan and only occurs in the Hengchun Peninsula in the extreme south of the country. It grows in mixed mesophytic forests at elevations of 500–1,500 m (1,600–4,900 ft).

The species was first described as Quercus dodonaeifolia by Bunzō Hayata in 1913. In 1917 Hayata placed the species in genus Lithocarpus as L. dodonaeifolius.

Lithocarpus dodonaeifolius is similar to L. formosanus, and their identity as separate species has been questioned. Molecular genetic methods suggest that they are closely related but distinct species.
