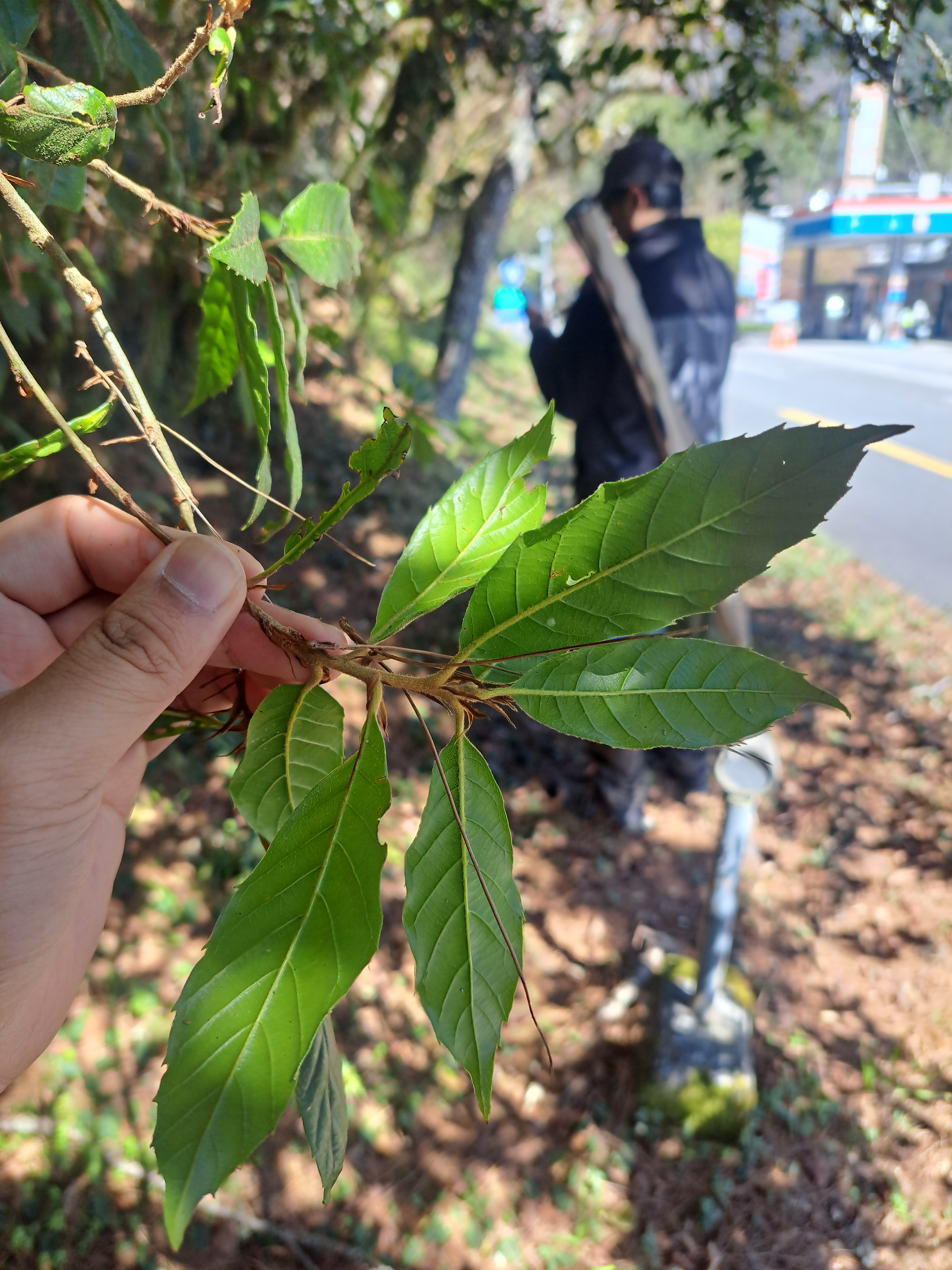
- Leaves of Quercus tatakaensis

Conservation status
- Data Deficient (IUCN 3.1)

Scientific classification
- Kingdom: Plantae
- Clade: Embryophytes
- Clade: Tracheophytes
- Clade: Angiosperms
- Clade: Eudicots
- Clade: Rosids
- Order: Fagales
- Family: Fagaceae
- Genus: Quercus
- Subgenus: Quercus subg. Cerris
- Section: Quercus sect. Ilex
- Species: Q. tatakaensis

Binomial name
- Quercus tatakaensis Tomiya

Synonyms
- Quercus semecarpifolia f. tatakaensis (Tomiya) J.C.Liao; Quercus taiwanensis S.S.Ying

= Quercus tatakaensis =

Species of flowering plant

Quercus tatakaensis is a species of oak. It is a tree endemic to Taiwan. It grows on steep slopes and in limestone soils in subtropical montane forests from 400 to 1,300 metres elevation. Little is known about the species' population, distribution, and habitat, and the IUCN Red List assesses the species as Data Deficient.

The species was described by Tosao Tomiya in 1944.
