= Former Residence of Chang Hsüeh-liang (Hsinchu County) =

Historic house in Wufeng, Hsinchu County, Taiwan

- 張學良故居
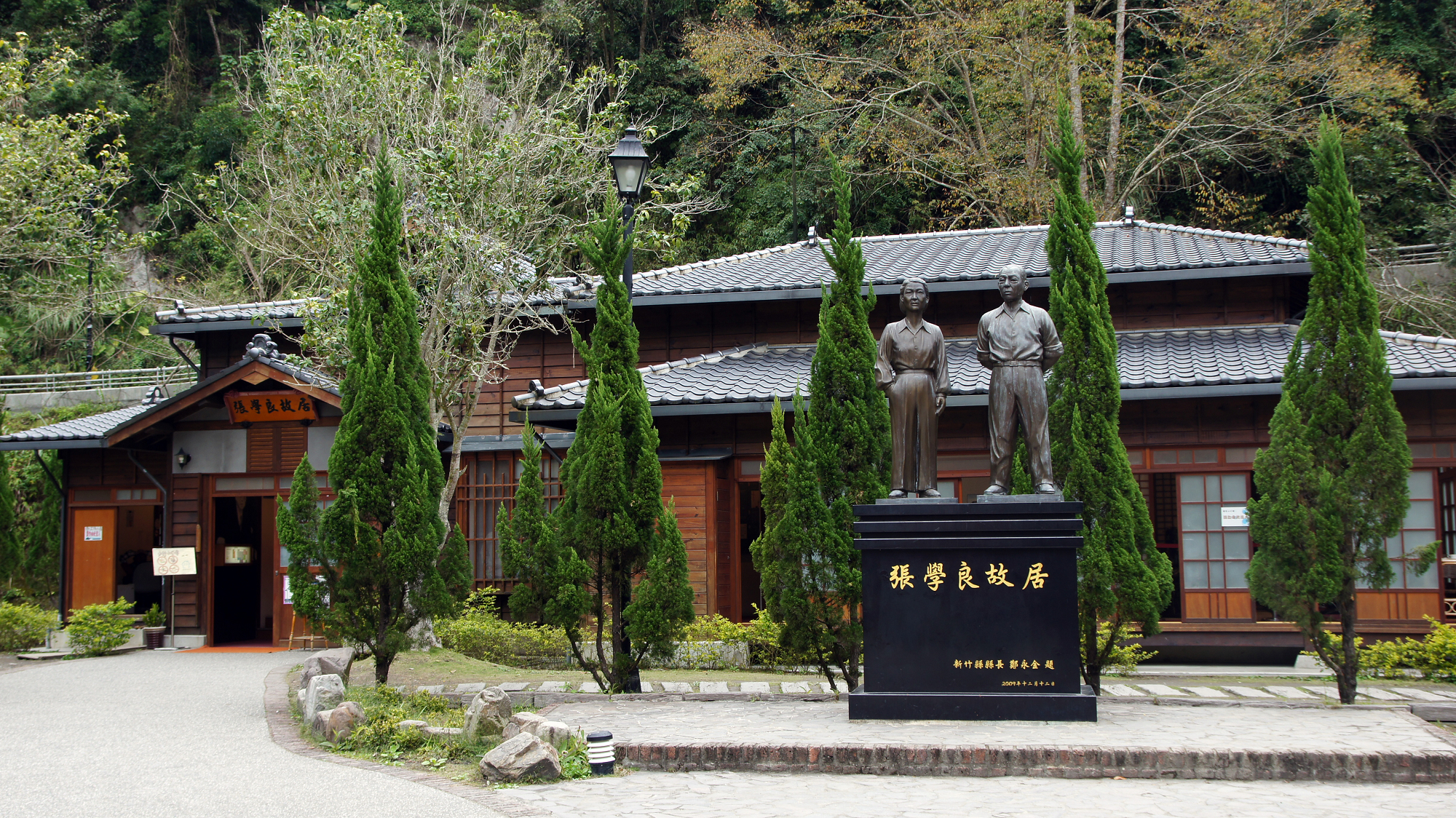
- Interactive map of the Former Residence of Chang Hsüeh-liang area

General information
- Type: museum
- Location: Wufeng, Hsinchu County, Taiwan
- Coordinates: 24°34′33.5″N 121°06′14.2″E
- Opened: 12 December 2008

Technical details
- Floor area: 150 m^{2}

The Former Residence of Chang Hsüeh-liang (traditional Chinese: 張學良故居; simplified Chinese: 张学良故居; pinyin: Zhāng Xuéliáng Gùjū) is a museum about Chang Hsüeh-liang (Zhang Xueliang) in Wufeng Township, Hsinchu County, Taiwan.

== History ==
Chang Hsüeh-liang is the person who declared the Chinese reunification in 1928 after the end of the Northern Expedition by the National Revolutionary Army led by Chiang Kai-shek to unite the Beiyang government under the Republic of China. Chiang was unwilling to cooperate with the Chinese Communist Party to defend China against the Imperial Japanese Army during the Second Sino-Japanese War. In December 1936, in the event called the Xi'an Incident, Chang took Chiang as hostage and demanded that he stop the civil war with the Communist Party and unite to fight against the Japanese.

After the handover of Taiwan from Japan to the Republic of China in 1945, Chiang imprisoned Chang due to the incident and sent him to Taiwan under house arrest in Wufeng Township, Hsinchu County from 1946 to 1957. Chang left Taiwan in 1993 to visit his relatives in the United States. In 1995, Chang and wife settled in Hawaii until his death on 14 October 2001 at the age of 100. In the Chinese way of counting, his age was 101.

The house where he was kept under house arrest was damaged due to a landslide in 1963. In July 2008, the building underwent renovation to restore it and was opened to public on 12 December 2008 during the 72nd anniversary of Xi'an Incident. The opening ceremony was attended by President Ma Ying-jeou. The house was then later closed down for renovation and was reopened on 20 September 2014.

== Architecture ==
The house spans about 150 m^{2} in area. It is decorated with Chang's old furniture and more than 500 pictures donated by his two nieces. A bronze statue of him and his wife is displayed outside the front of the historical house.

== See also ==
- Xi'an Incident
- List of tourist attractions in Taiwan
