= Pas-ta'ai =

Ritual of the Saisiyat people

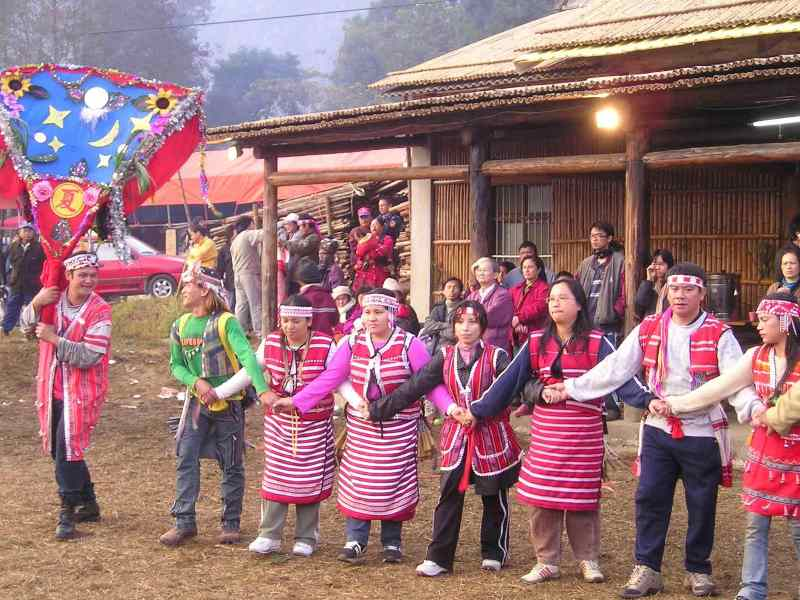
Pas-ta'ai ceremonies at Nanzhuang, Miaoli, Taiwan

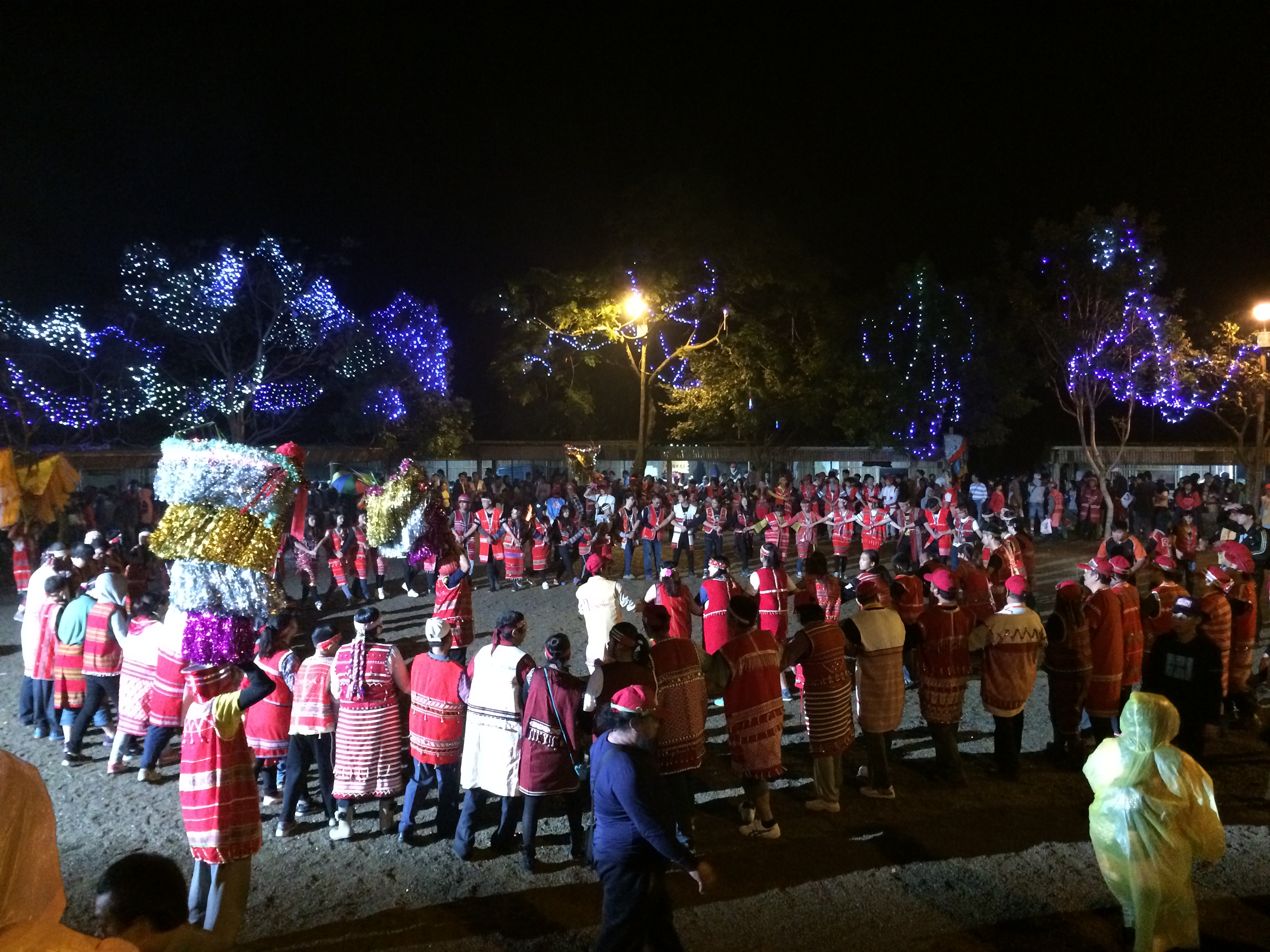
Pas-ta'ai ceremonies at Wufeng, Hsinchu, Taiwan

Pas-ta'ai (Chinese: 矮靈祭; pinyin: Ǎilíngjì), the "Ritual to the Spirits of the Short [People]", is a ritual of the Saisiyat people, a Taiwanese aboriginal group. The ritual commemorates the Ta'ai, a tribe of short dark-skinned people they say used to live near them. The ritual is held every two years and all Saisiyat are expected to participate.

== History ==
The Pas-ta'ai ritual is purported to have been practiced for 400 years and was initially practiced every year during the harvest season. It was first recorded in 1915 in the Surveys of the Customs of Barbarian Tribes by researchers operating under the colonial Japanese government. Under Japanese rule, the frequency was reduced to once every two years. According to anthropologist and filmmaker Hu Tai-li, from the Institute of Ethnology at Academia Sinica, the tradition had died down to the point to where it was largely only the elders of the Saisiyat who could practice the rituals; over the last 20 years, however, the tradition has been revitalized in the scope of the larger Aboriginal Taiwanese movement as well as through increasing outsider interest. The Pas-ta'ai ceremonies were officially designated as Taiwan's Cultural Heritage in 2009 and 2010 respectively. Over the years, certain external forces have had negative repercussions on the ritual, including improper intervention on the part of government administrative sectors, biased media coverage, improper tourist behaviour, and the proliferation of waste.

== Legend ==
There are slightly different versions of the narrative surrounding the ritual. According to one legend of the Saisiyat, the short people, who were dark-skinned, less than a meter high and lived on the other side of the river, excelled in singing and dancing and were invited to the harvest festivals of the Saisiyat, engaging in a long-standing mutually beneficial relationship. The short people, however, were lascivious and often made advances towards the Saisiyat women. One day, some young Saisiyat decided to take revenge because of this disrespectful act. They cut the sturdy tree on which the short people rested. All the short people, except for two elders, fell from the cliff and died. These two surviving elders taught the Saisiyat the songs and dances of the Pas-ta'ai ritual and then left for the east. Shortly afterwards, the Saisiyat suffered from famine, which they attributed to the vengeful pygmy spirits. In order to appease the spirits, the Saisiyat began to hold the Pas-ta'ai and beg for forgiveness. In addition, the Saisiyat were to be hardworking, fair, honest, and tolerant in dealing with others.

In another version, the two elders of the short people put a curse on the Saisiyat, who pleaded for forgiveness. The elders allowed this on the condition that the Saisiyat practice the dances of the short people to appease the spirits of the dead, else the crops of the Saisiyat would fail and wither.

According to the legends, the short people had magical skills and brought luck to the Saisiyat if treated with respect or handled well.

== Ceremony ==
The ceremony is traditionally the responsibility of the Saisiyat Titiyon family. The ceremony is held in Shiangtian Lake, Donghe Village, Nanzhuang Township (the southern ceremonial group) and in Taai Village, Wufeng Township (the northern ceremonial group). The ritual is held over the course of three days and nights, during the full moon of the 10th lunar month (mid-October), and occurs biannually - the first ritual held in a 10-year period is larger and carries more significance. The southern ceremony takes place one day earlier than its northern counterpart, and the two slightly differ in detail. One or two months before the ritual, both ceremonial groups send their delegates to decide on an appropriate date to hold the ritual, which is around the fifteenth day of the tenth month in the lunar calendar. Preparations are then begun and ceremonial songs, forbidden on other occasions, are practiced. The rituals, dances and songs performed in the Pas-ta'ai are complex, consisting of the five phases of raraol (welcoming the spirits), kisirinaolan (treating the spirits), kisitomal (entertaining the spirits), papatnawasak (chasing the spirits) and papaosa (sending off the spirits). Following the five phases is the "post-ritual ceremony," which brings the ceremony to an end.

Traditional costumes with ornate decorations and bells (which enable a connection to the spirit world) are worn for the ceremony. Silvergrass is used to provide spiritual security and to ward off evil. Tribal taboos are carefully observed during the ceremony; Saisiyat tradition holds that those who misbehave during the ceremony will consequently suffer from ill events.

== Origins ==
The description of the Little People as dark-skinned and pygmy-like in stature has led to theories and associations with the Negritos of Southeast Asia. There is currently no scholarly consensus on whether the Little People were of pre-Austronesian origin if they existed at all. Some anthropologists suggest these may have been Proto-Australoid people who possibly arrived from Africa during the early Southern Dispersal 60,000 years ago. The Tsou, Bunun, and Paiwan peoples of Taiwan (amongst others) also hold oral traditions of the existence of similar pygmy-like short peoples who possess similar anthropometric traits with Negritos, possibly suggesting widespread Negrito presence on Taiwan prior to the Austronesian migration, though no physical evidence had been found that attests to their existence, until 2022. A 2019 genetic study comparing the genetic markers of Philippine Negritos with that of several indigenous Taiwanese peoples was inconclusive in its findings; "The deep coalescence of B4b1a2 in the Philippine Negritos, Saisiyat, Atayal, Island Southeast Asia, and SEA (Southeast Asia) suggested a deeply rooted common ancestry, but could not support a past Negrito presence in Taiwan. Conversely, the sharing of cultural components and mtDNa haplogroup D6a2 in Saisiyat, Atayal and Philippine Negritos may characterize a Negrito signature in Taiwan. Although the molecular variation of D6a2 determines its presence in Taiwan back to middle Neolithic, other markers, Y-SNP haplogroups C-M146 and K-M9, warrant further analysis."

Anthropologist Gregory Forth proposes that a common origin lies between the Taiwanese traditions and similar Malayo-Polynesian accounts of little people.

Other theories purport that the "Little People" could be African slaves brought by European merchants during the 1600s. Letters sent by Dutch traders visiting Taiwan in the 1600s mention the existence of "short people" on the island.

== See also ==
- Korpokkur
- Menehune
- Little people (mythology)
- Dwarves
- Fairies
