= Museum of Saisiyat Folklore =

Museum in Nanzhuang, Miaoli County, Taiwan

- 賽夏族民俗文物館
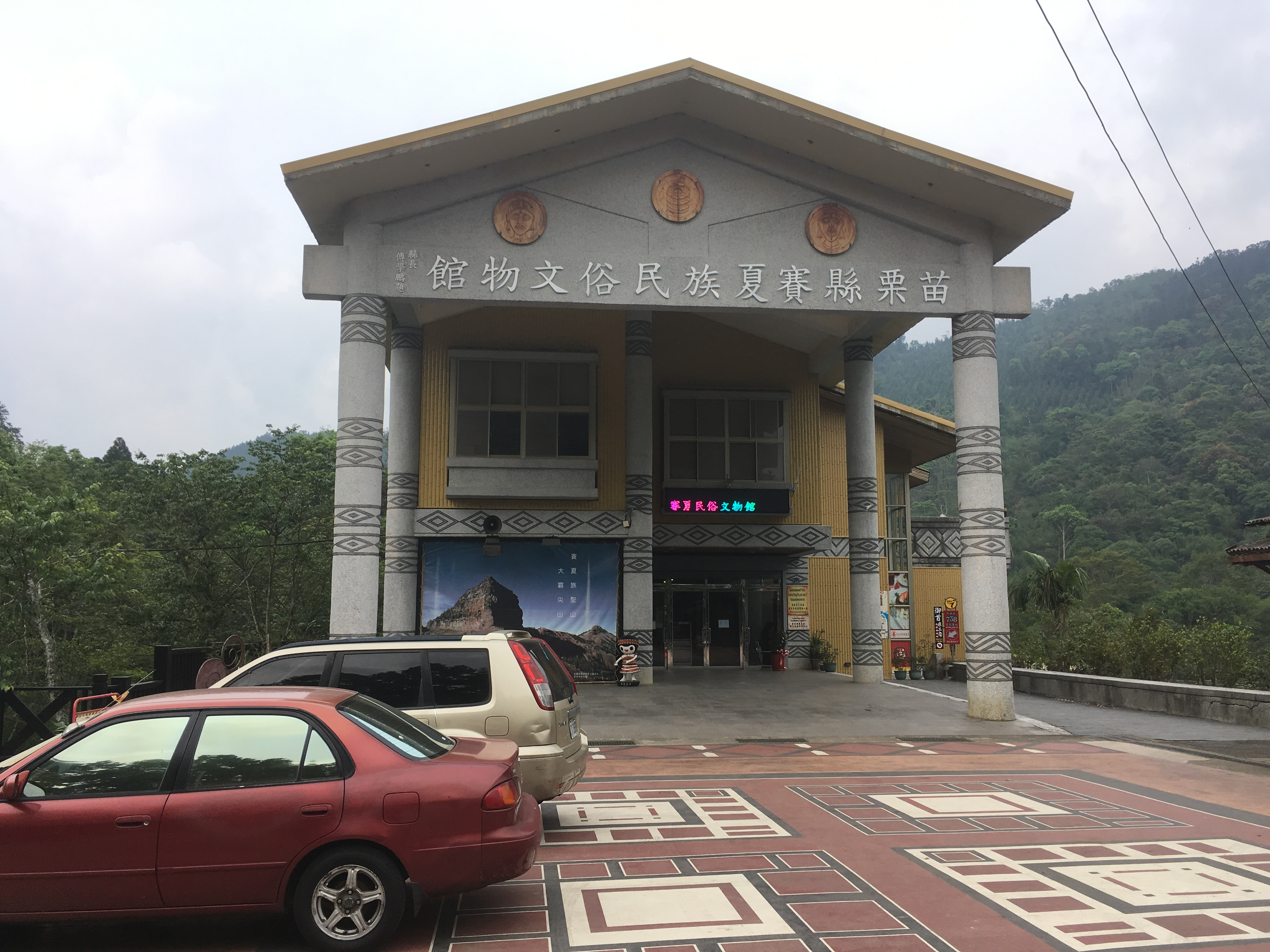
- Location: Nanzhuang, Miaoli County, Taiwan
- Coordinates: 24°35′00″N 121°02′02″E
- Type: museum
- Owner: Miaoli County Government

The Museum of Saisiyat Folklore (traditional Chinese: 賽夏族民俗文物館; simplified Chinese: 赛夏族民俗文物馆; pinyin: Sàixiàzú Mínsú Wénwùguǎn) is a museum of Saisiyat people in Nanzhuang Township, Miaoli County, Taiwan. The museum is dedicated to the culture of the people and their Festival of Short People (Chinese: 賽夏族矮靈祭; pinyin: Sàixiàzú Ǎlíngjì).

== History ==
The museum was set up by Miaoli County Government with subsidies from the central government.

== Architecture ==
The museum is a 3-story building. The total floor area of the museum is around 1,800 m^{2}. The finished architecture surface of the museum is wrapped with bamboo-weaving art of the Saisiyat culture and the stone columns are decorated with Saisiyat's special totems.

== Transportation ==
The museum is accessible by bus from Zhunan Station of Taiwan Railway.

== See also ==
- List of museums in Taiwan
- Taiwanese aborigines
