= Wufeng, Hsinchu =

Mountain indigenous township of Hsinchu County, Taiwan

Coordinates: 24°35′28″N 121°8′53″E

Wufeng Township 五峰鄉
- Mountain indigenous township
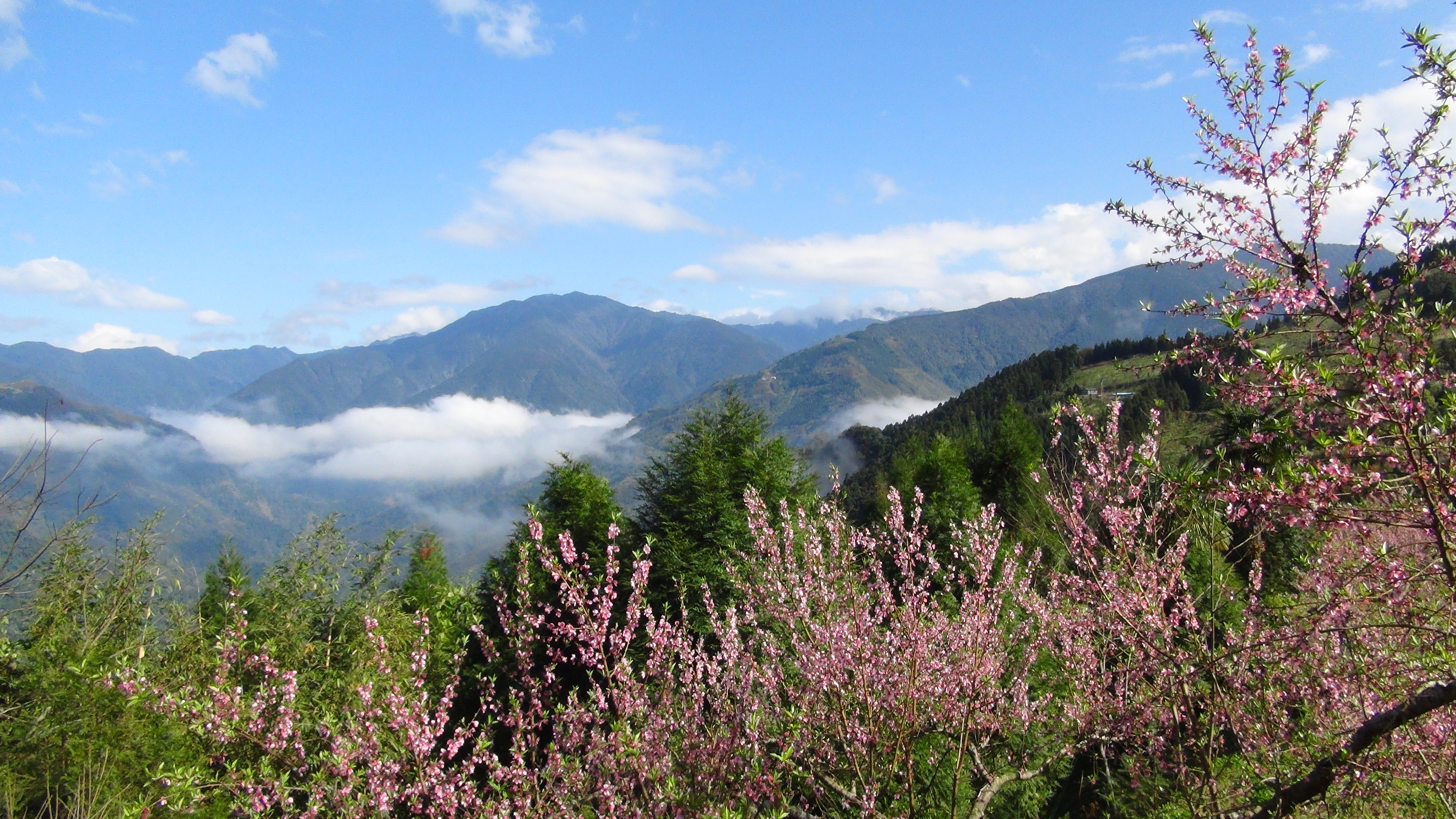

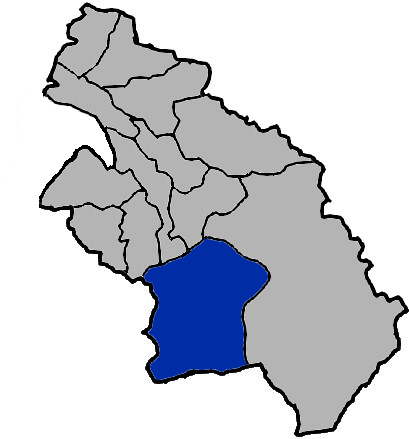
- Wufeng Township in Hsinchu County
- Location: Hsinchu County, Taiwan

Area
  - Total: 228 km^{2} (88 sq mi)

Population (March 2023)
  - Total: 4,488
  - Density: 19.7/km^{2} (51.0/sq mi)
- Website: wufeng.hsinchu.gov.tw/Default.aspx (in Chinese)

Wufeng Township (Chinese: 五峰鄉; pinyin: Wǔfēng Xiāng) is a mountain indigenous township in Hsinchu County, Taiwan.

It had an estimated population of 4,488 as of March 2023. The population is mainly of the indigenous Atayal people and Saisiyat people.

== Administrative divisions ==
Administrative divisions of Wufeng Township

The township comprises four villages: Daai, Huayuan, Taoshan and Zhulin.

== Tourist attractions ==
- Guanwu National Forest Recreation Area
- Pas-ta'ai ceremonial ground
- Former Residence of Chang Hsüeh-liang

== Climate ==
Climate data for Wufeng Agricultural Research and Extension Station, elevation 1,048 m (3,438 ft), (1991–2020 normals, extremes 1995–present）
Month	Jan	Feb	Mar	Apr	May	Jun	Jul	Aug	Sep	Oct	Nov	Dec	Year
Record high °C (°F)	28.4 (83.1)	31.3 (88.3)	30.5 (86.9)	30.8 (87.4)	31.4 (88.5)	33.4 (92.1)	35.5 (95.9)	32.2 (90.0)	31.4 (88.5)	32.3 (90.1)	29.8 (85.6)	26.0 (78.8)	35.5 (95.9)
Mean daily maximum °C (°F)	15.3 (59.5)	16.3 (61.3)	18.6 (65.5)	21.5 (70.7)	24.1 (75.4)	26.3 (79.3)	27.2 (81.0)	26.4 (79.5)	25.0 (77.0)	22.5 (72.5)	20.3 (68.5)	16.7 (62.1)	21.7 (71.0)
Daily mean °C (°F)	10.8 (51.4)	11.8 (53.2)	13.9 (57.0)	17.1 (62.8)	19.8 (67.6)	21.8 (71.2)	22.4 (72.3)	22.0 (71.6)	20.8 (69.4)	18.2 (64.8)	16.0 (60.8)	12.3 (54.1)	17.2 (63.0)
Mean daily minimum °C (°F)	8.0 (46.4)	8.9 (48.0)	10.7 (51.3)	14.1 (57.4)	17.0 (62.6)	19.0 (66.2)	19.6 (67.3)	19.4 (66.9)	18.2 (64.8)	15.6 (60.1)	13.2 (55.8)	9.6 (49.3)	14.4 (58.0)
Record low °C (°F)	−4.0 (24.8)	−1.2 (29.8)	−0.3 (31.5)	2.8 (37.0)	11.6 (52.9)	12.2 (54.0)	16.5 (61.7)	17.3 (63.1)	12.6 (54.7)	7.4 (45.3)	2.3 (36.1)	−1.3 (29.7)	−4.0 (24.8)
Average precipitation mm (inches)	107.5 (4.23)	156.9 (6.18)	186.2 (7.33)	194.6 (7.66)	272.3 (10.72)	295.2 (11.62)	345.2 (13.59)	478.6 (18.84)	335.6 (13.21)	138.0 (5.43)	67.3 (2.65)	87.2 (3.43)	2,664.6 (104.89)
Average relative humidity (%)	86.3	87.6	88.7	88.1	88.8	87.2	86.7	89.7	88.7	87.6	85.4	85.1	87.5
Source: Central Weather Administration
