= Chuang Chi-fa =

Taiwanese historian

- 莊吉發
- Born: 24 May 1936 (age 90); Nanzhuang, Shinchiku, Taiwan, Empire of Japan
- Education: National Taiwan Normal University (BA); National Taiwan University (PhD)
- Occupation: Historian

Chuang Chi-fa (also known as Zhuang Jifa; Chinese: 莊吉發; born 24 May 1936) is a Taiwanese historian who studies Chinese history, in particular Manchu history. Chuang is one of the few linguistic researchers with a mastery of the Manchu language.

His 1982 book "Qing Gaozong shiquan wugong yanjiu" (researching the Qianlong Emperor's "Ten Great Campaigns") was called a tour de force by Yingcong Dai of William Paterson University. With Ch'en Chieh-hsien he was one of the first historians to research the Manchu language documents in the Qing dynasty archives at the National Palace Museum.

== Early life and education ==
Chuang was born in Nanzhuang, Shinchiku Prefecture, Taiwan, Empire of Japan. His parents died when he was young, and he was adopted by another family. He graduated from the National Taiwan Normal University and in 1969 from National Taiwan University.

== Career ==
Chuang teaches and studies modern Chinese history, Chinese minorities history, and Manchu history (his main focus). He was a researcher at the National Palace Museum.

Chuang has taught at Tamkang University, Soochow University, National Taiwan Normal University, and National Chengchi University.
