= Nanzhuang Theater =

Theater in Nanzhuang, Miaoli County, Taiwan

- 南庄大戲院
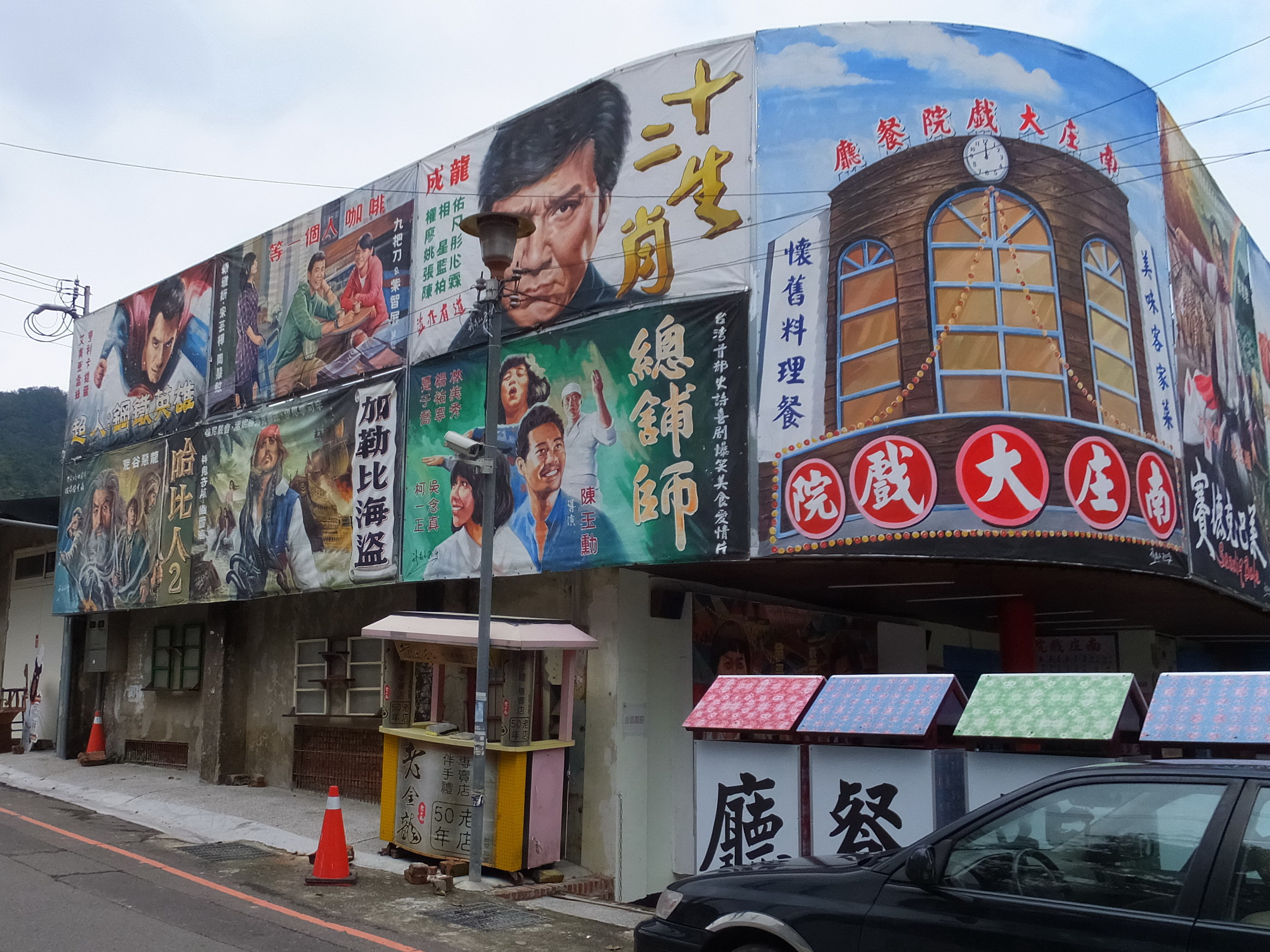
- Interactive map of Nanzhuang Theater
- Location: Nanzhuang, Miaoli County, Taiwan
- Coordinates: 24°35′56.1″N 120°59′52.6″E
- Type: movie theater, restaurant

The Jindong Movie Theater (traditional Chinese: 南庄大戲院; simplified Chinese: 南庄大戏院; pinyin: Nánzhuāng Dà Xìyuàn) is a movie theater and restaurant in Nanzhuang Township, Miaoli County, Taiwan.

== History ==
The theater was established in 1946.

== Architecture ==
The movie theater building is decorated with various movie posters around it. It shows old movies and serves Hakka cuisines.

== See also ==
- Cinema of Taiwan
