= South Taiwan monsoon rain forests =

Ecoregion in Southern Taiwan

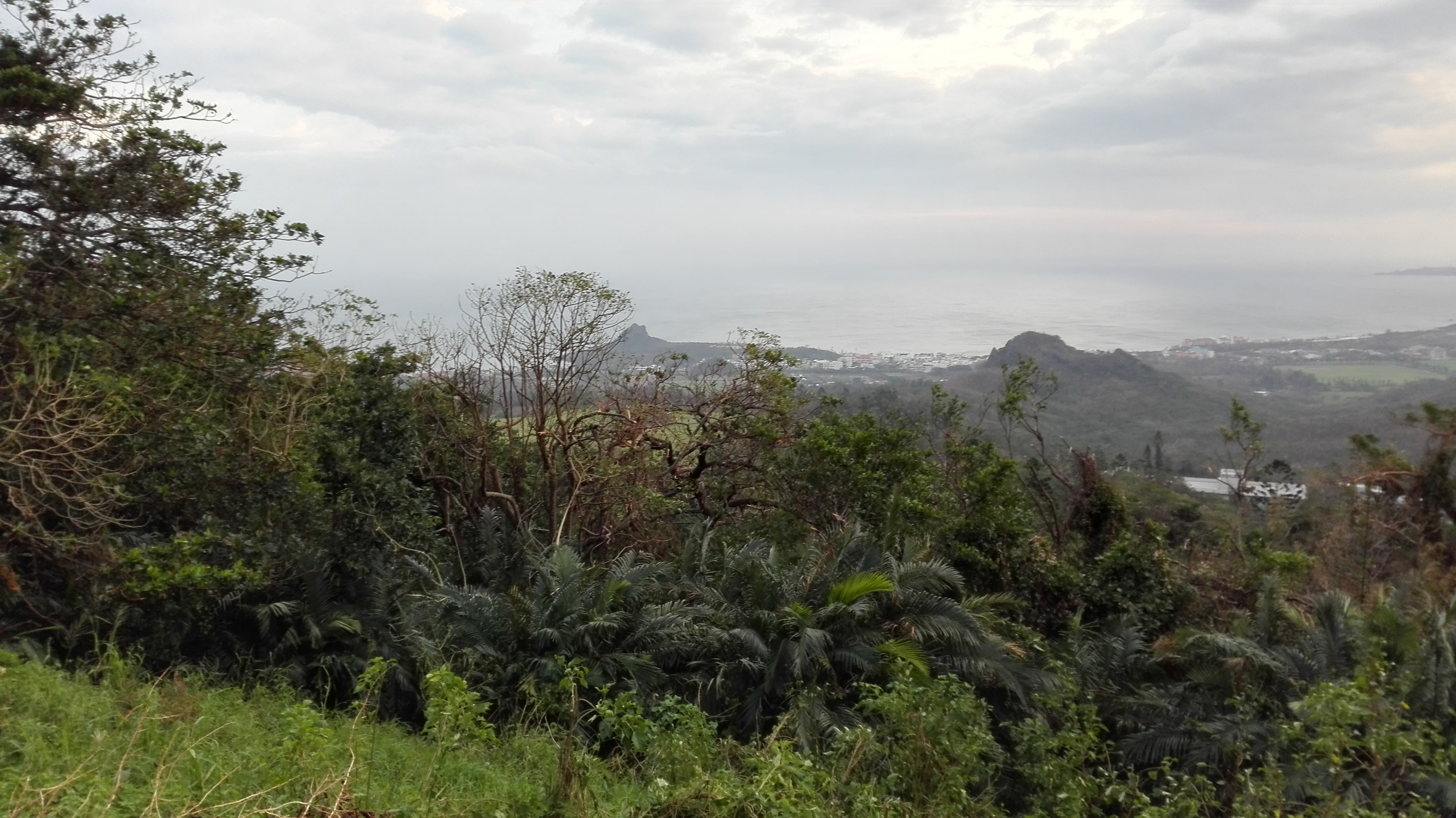
- View in Kenting National Park

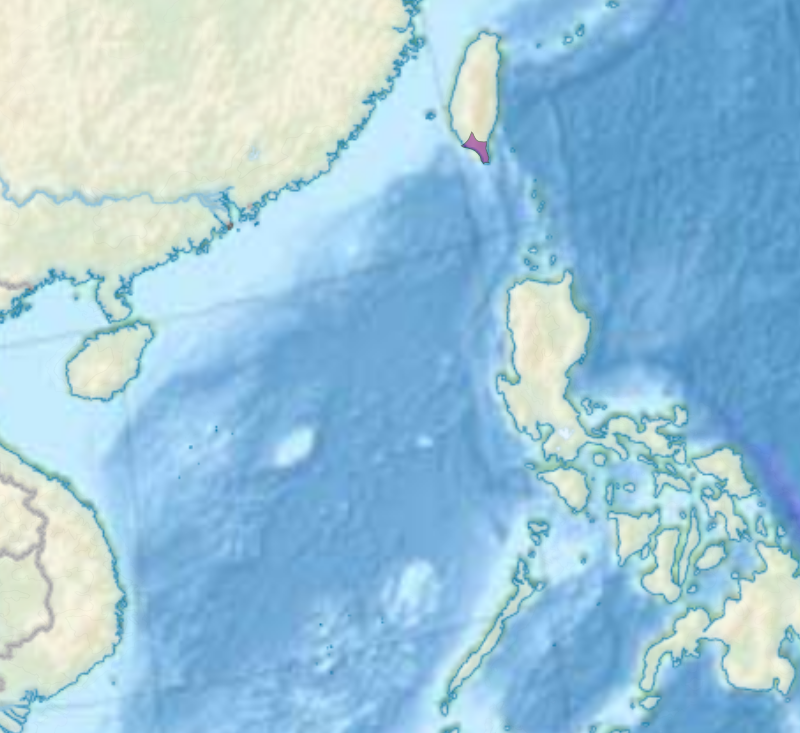
- Ecoregion territory (in purple)

Ecology
- Realm: Indomalayan realm
- Biome: tropical and subtropical moist broadleaf forests
- Borders: Taiwan subtropical evergreen forests

Geography
- Area: 2,590 km^{2} (1,000 mi^{2})
- Country: Taiwan
- Coordinates: 22°30′N 120°45′E

Conservation
- Protected: 349 km^{2} (135 sq mi) (14%)

The South Taiwan monsoon rain forests ecoregion (WWF ID: IM0171) covers the southern tip of Taiwan, 200 km east of the mainland. The area is one of high biodiversity, due to its location between temperate and subtropical zones, its monsoon exposure, and its high elevation variation (from mangrove forests at sea level to inland mountains).

== Location and description ==
The ecoregion covers only the southernmost 60 km of the island, 70 km west to east at its widest. The central ridge is mountainous, with a flat coastal flat on the northwest. The ecoregion is only 1,000 square miles in area. Much of the southern tip of the island is protected by Kenting National Park. It is bounded on the north by the Taiwan subtropical evergreen forests ecoregion.

== Climate ==
The climate of the ecoregion is tropical monsoon (Köppen climate classification (Am)). This climate is characterized as having no month averaging below 18 °C (64 °F), and typically a very rainy wet season and relatively short dry season.

== Flora and fauna ==
The inland mountains support forests of both evergreen and deciduous trees. The evergreens include Chinese banyan (Ficus microcarpa) and Chinese cryptocarya (Cryptocarya chinensis); deciduous trees include Kapok (Bombax ceiba). The coastal mangrove forests feature the Asiatic mangrove (Rhizophora mucronata) and Black mangrove (Bruguiera gymnorhiza). The coastal areas support migratory birds on the East Asian–Australasian Flyway.

Forests in Nanjenshan Reserve are of three main types. Low-canopied forests (3–5 meters) grow on northeast-facing (windward) ridges and slopes, with Illicium arborescens and Lithocarpus amygdalifolius as the predominant trees, and Psychotria rubra as the most common shrub. Taller forests (10–15 meter canopy height) grow on leeward (southwest or northwest-facing) slopes, with Schefflera octophylla, Helicia formosana, Ilex cochinchinensis, and species of Fagaceae and Lauraceae as the most abundant canopy trees. In sheltered valley forests Ficus benjamina is the predominant tree, forming a canopy 15 to 20 meters tall. Aglaia elliptifolia is a common tree, and Psychotria rubra is the most common shrub.

== Conservation ==
A 2017 assessment found that 349 km², or 14%, of the ecoregion is in protected areas. Another 68% is forested but outside protected areas. Protected areas include:

- Kenting National Park
- Dawu Working Circle Taiwan Amentotaxus Nature Reserve
- Dawushan Nature Reserve
- Kenting Uplifted Coral Reefs Nature Reserve
- Xuhai-Guanyinbi Nature Reserve
- Dawu Taiwan Keteleeria Forest Reserve
- Chachayalaishan Major Wildlife Habitat
- Jin-shuei-ying Major Wildlife Habitat

== See also ==
- List of ecoregions in China
