= Saisiyat people =

Saisiyat
SaySiyat 賽夏
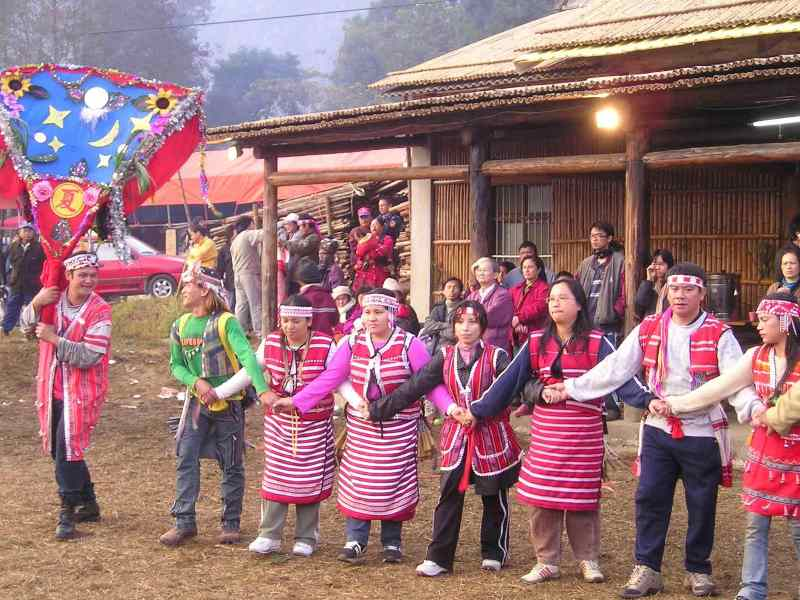
- Pas-ta'ai ceremonies in Nanzhuang, Miaoli, Taiwan

Total population
- 6,743 (2020)

Regions with significant populations
- Taiwan

Languages
- Saisiyat, Atayal, Mandarin, Hokkien, Hakka

Religion
- Animism, Christianity

Related ethnic groups
- Taiwanese indigenous peoples

The Saisiyat (Saisiyat: SaySiyat; Chinese: 賽夏; pinyin: Sàixià; Wade–Giles: Sai⁴ Hsia⁴; Pe̍h-ōe-jī: Sai-siat (獅設); lit. 'true people'; Hakka Pha̍k-fa-sṳ: Sòi-hà (賽夏)), also spelled Saisiat, are an indigenous people of Taiwan. In 2000 the Saisiyat numbered 5,311, which was approximately 1.3% of Taiwan's total indigenous population, making them one of the smallest Indigenous groups in the country. The Saisiyat inhabit Western Taiwan, overlapping the border between Hsinchu County and Miaoli County. They are divided into the Northern Branch (Wufeng in the mountainous Hsinchu area) and the Southern Branch (Nanzhuang and Shitan in the highlands of Miaoli), each with its own dialect. Their language is also known as Saisiyat.

== Names ==
Saisiyat are sometimes rendered as Saiset, Seisirat, Saisett, Saisiat, Saisiett, Saisirat, Saisyet, Saisyett, Amutoura, or Bouiok.

== History ==
A series of major conflicts between the Kingdom of Tungning and the Saisiyat people left the Saisiyat decimated and with much of their land in the hands of the Kingdom. The details of the conflicts remain mysterious however historians agree that the outcome was negative for the Saisiyat.

The first Indigenous victim of the White Terror was Jih Chin-chun, a Saisiyat man executed in 1952.

== Culture ==
The Saisiyat people hold a festival called Pasta’ay every two years.

=== Saisiat Global Flood Account ===
In the ancient times, human beings were created by god and lived in the original land. Then a flood happened suddenly and human beings were dispersed everywhere without knowing what would happen. Then, a man sat on a weaving loom and floated to Airubia Mountain. There was a god called Otspoehobong (Oopenhaboon) on the mountains. The god grabbed the man suddenly. Fearing that the flood would cause human beings to be extinct, the god killed the survivor, pounded his flesh, chanted an incantation, and threw the flesh of the dismembered corpse into the sea. The flesh turned into human beings. They were our ancestors named Siasiat by the god. Then the god cut his intestines and threw into the sea. The intestines turned into human beings. They were the ancestors, of Taiwanese... Then it threw his bones into the sea. The bones also turned into human beings. They were ancestors of the indomitable Atayal people.

== See also ==
- Taiwanese indigenous peoples
- Museum of Saisiyat Folklore
- History of Taiwan
- Koro-pok-guru
- Pas-ta'ai
- Shanyue
- Beipu uprising
