= Nanzhuang =

Rural township in Miaoli County, Taiwan

Coordinates: 24.569919°N 121.015724°E

Nanzhuang Township 南庄鄉 Nanjhuang
- Rural township
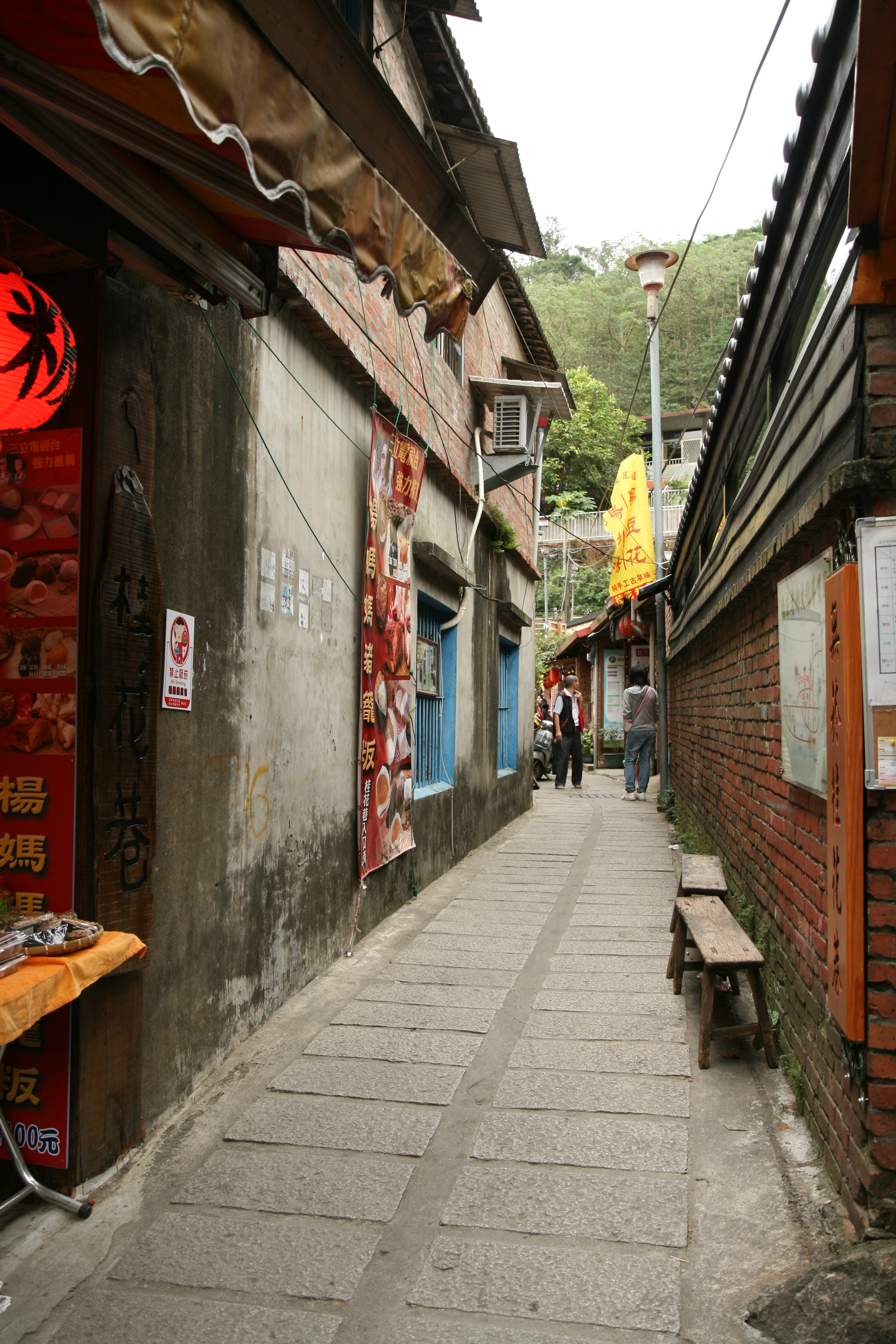
- An alley in the old town of Nanzhuang Township

- Nanzhuang Township in Miaoli County
- Location: Miaoli County, Taiwan

Area
  - Total: 165 km^{2} (64 sq mi)

Population (January 2023)
  - Total: 9,029
  - Density: 54.7/km^{2} (142/sq mi)
- Website: www.nanchuang.gov.tw (in Chinese)

Nanzhuang Township
- Chinese: 南庄鄉
- Hanyu Pinyin: Nánzhuāng Xiāng
- Wade–Giles: Nan^{2}-chuang^{1} Hsiang^{1}
- Tongyong Pinyin: Nánjhuang Siang
- Pha̍k-fa-sṳ: Nàm-chông-hiông
- Hokkien POJ: Lâm-chng-hiong

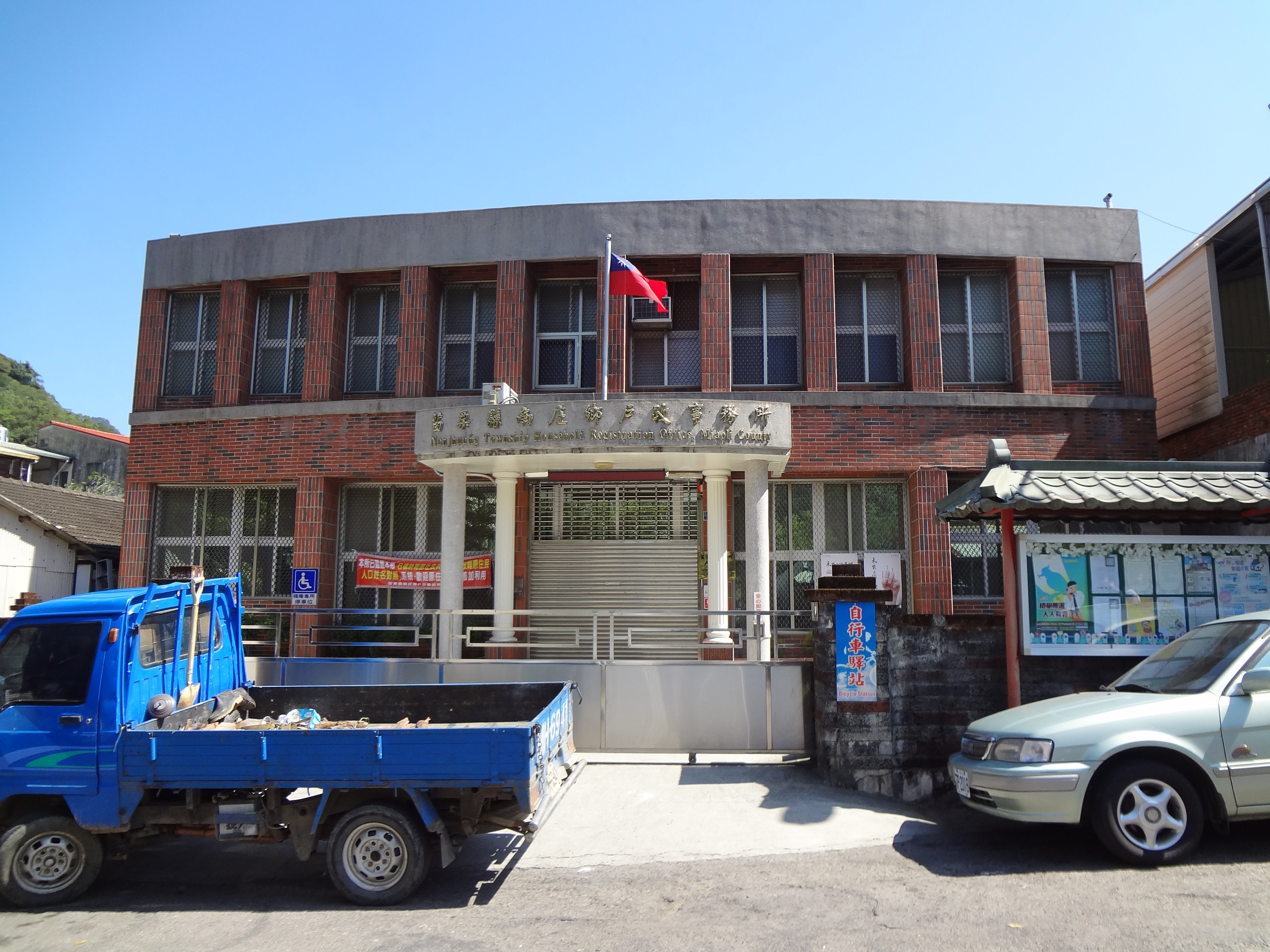
Nanjhuang Township Household Registration Office, Miaoli County

Nanzhuang Township is a rural township in Miaoli County, Taiwan.

== Geography ==
It has an area of 165.49 square kilometres (63.90 sq mi).

== Demographics ==
It has a total population of 9,029 (January 2023) consisting of Hakkas, Hoklos and indigenous Saisiyat and Atayal people.

== Administrative divisions ==
The township comprises nine villages: Nanfu, Nanjiang, Penglai, Shishan, Tianmei, Tung, Tunghe, Xi and Yuanlin.

== Politics ==
The township is part of Miaoli County Constituency II electoral district for Legislative Yuan.

== Transportation ==
- Guo-Guang Motor Transit Company

== Tourist attractions ==
- Museum of Saisiyat Folklore
- Nanzhuang Old Street
- Nanzhuang Theater
- Quanhua Temple
- Shenxian Valley
- Shitoushan (Lion's Head Mountain) Temple
- Xiangtian Lake
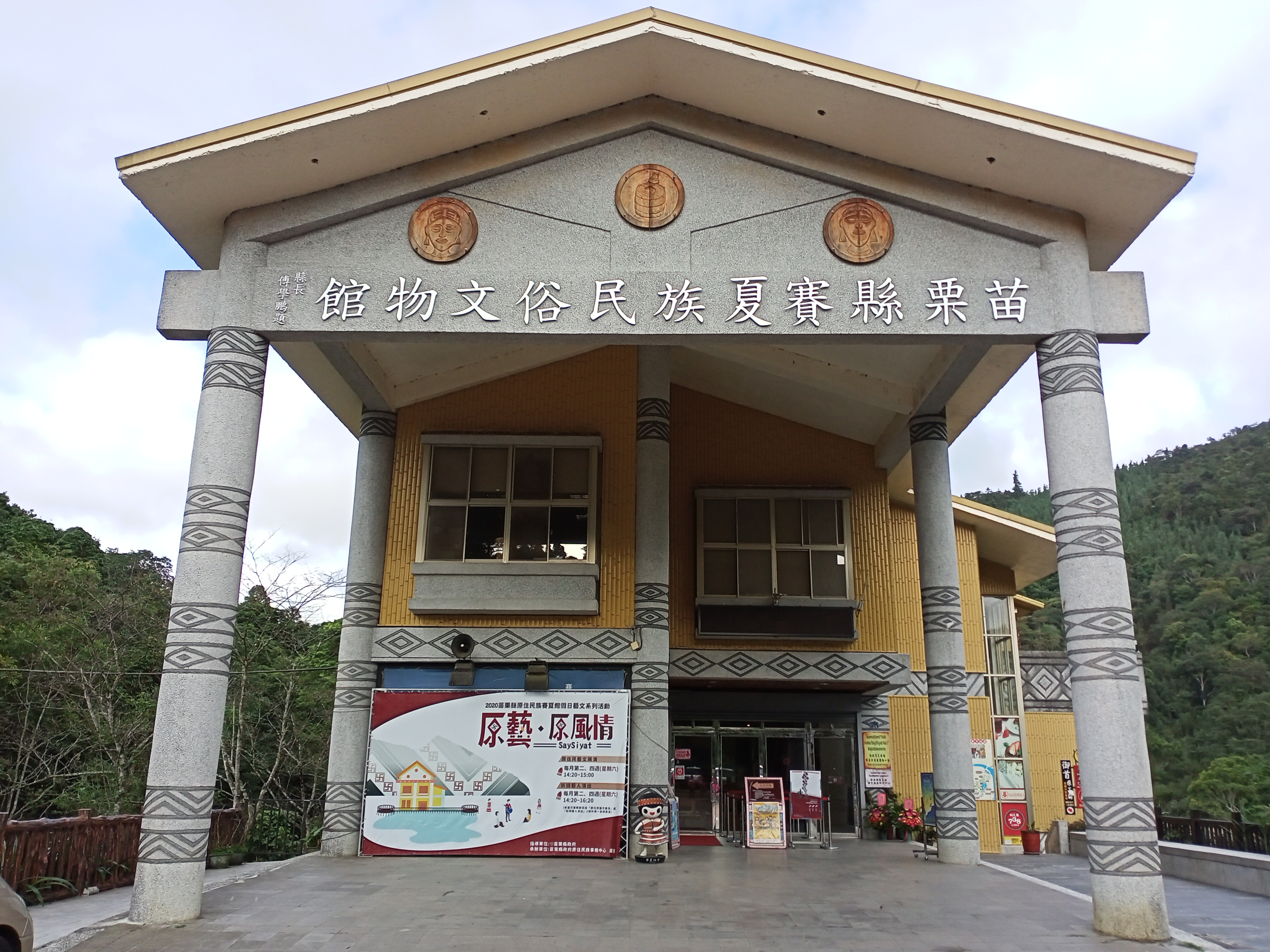
Museum of Saisiyat Folklore

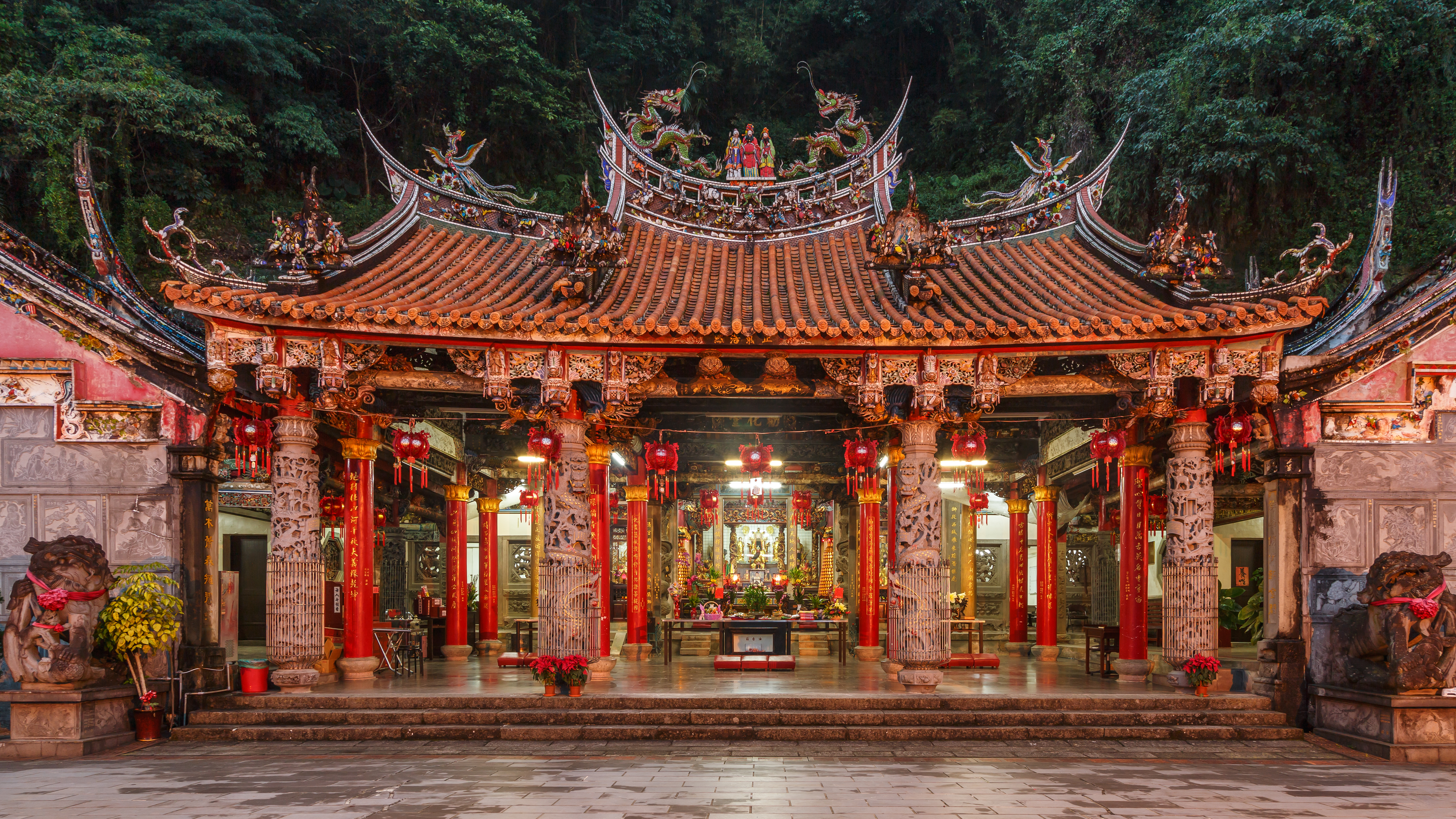
Quanhua Temple

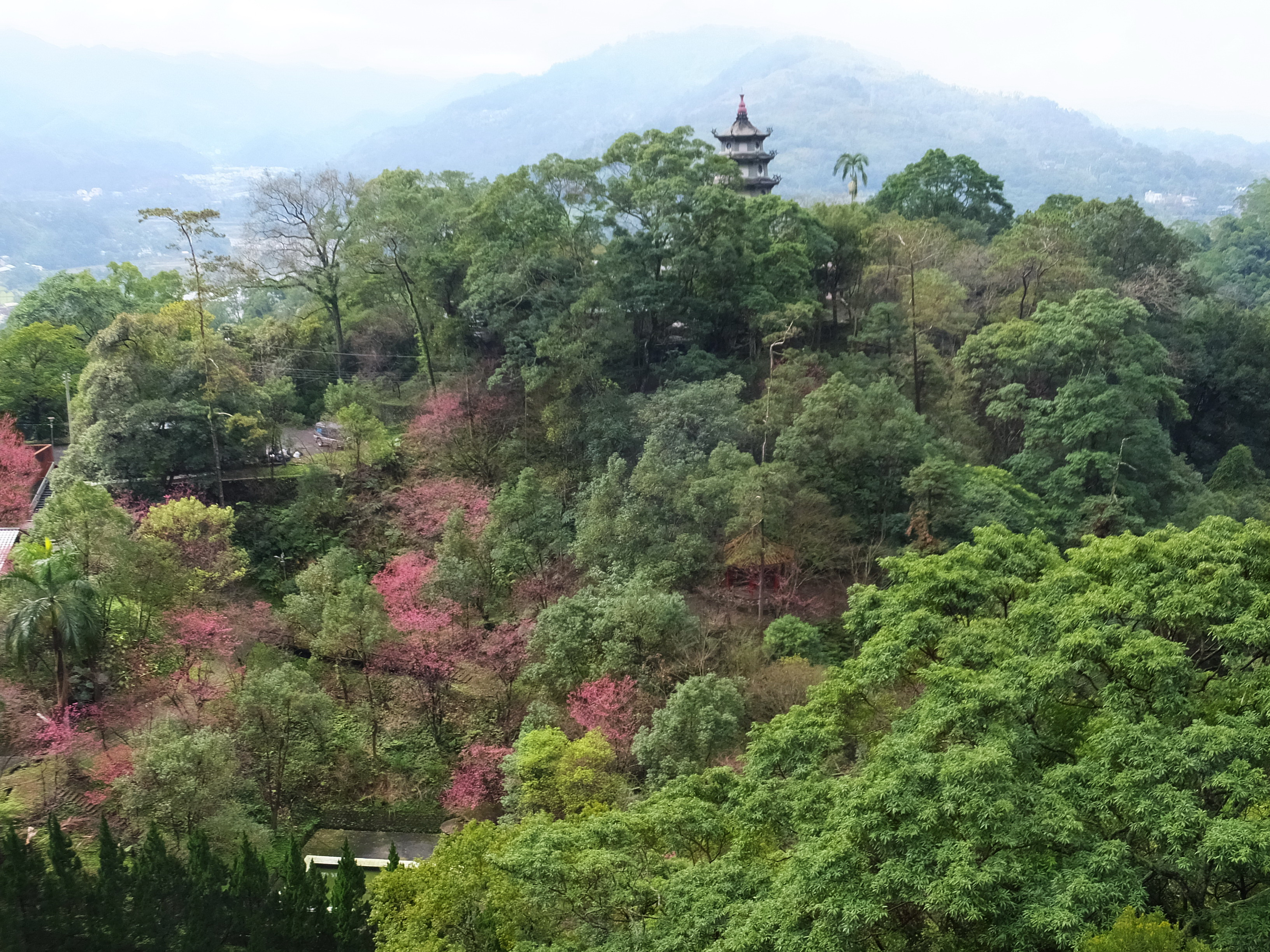
Shitoushan in Nanzhuang Township

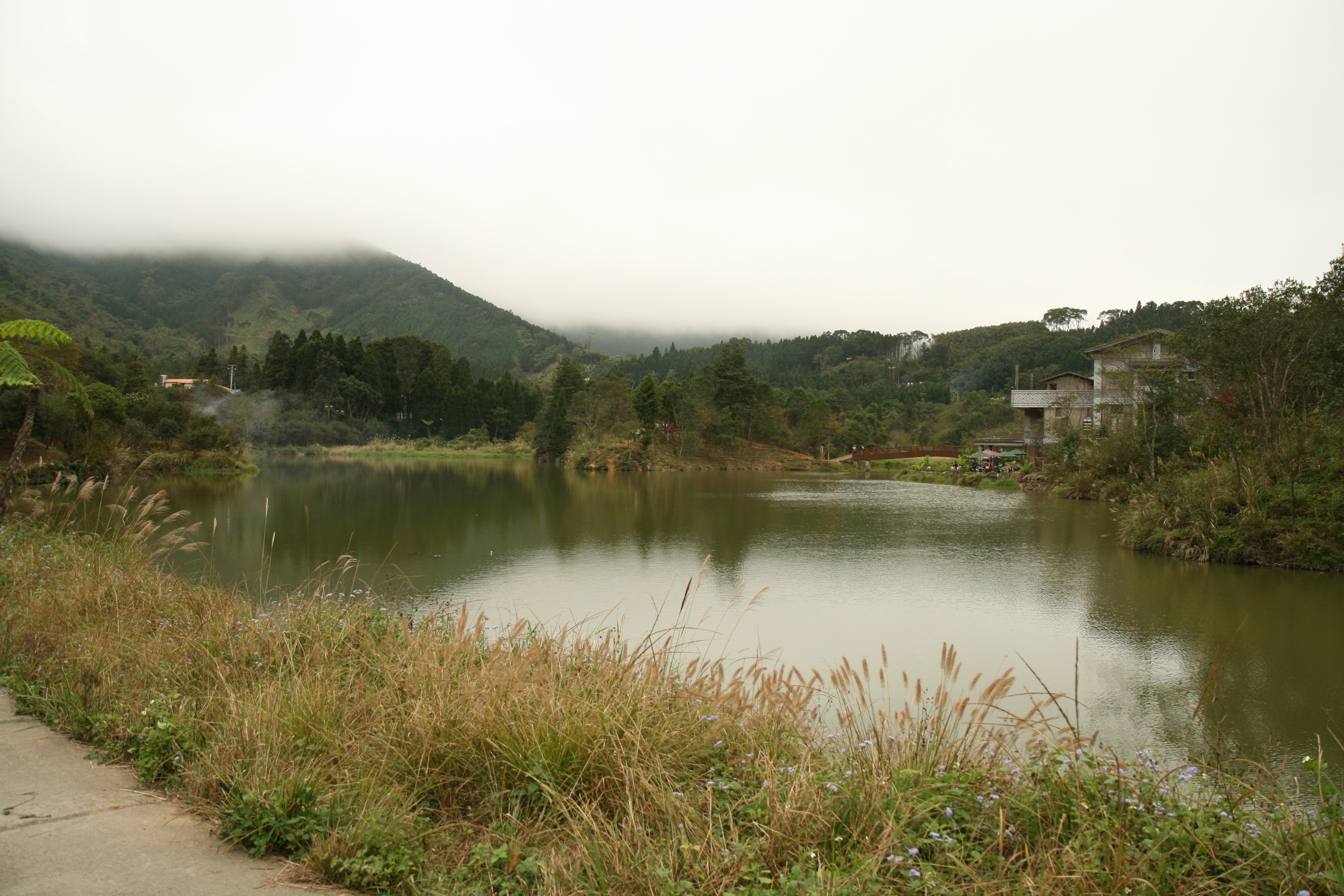
Xiangtian Lake

== Notable natives ==
- Chuang Chi-fa, historian

== See also ==
- Citrus taiwanica
