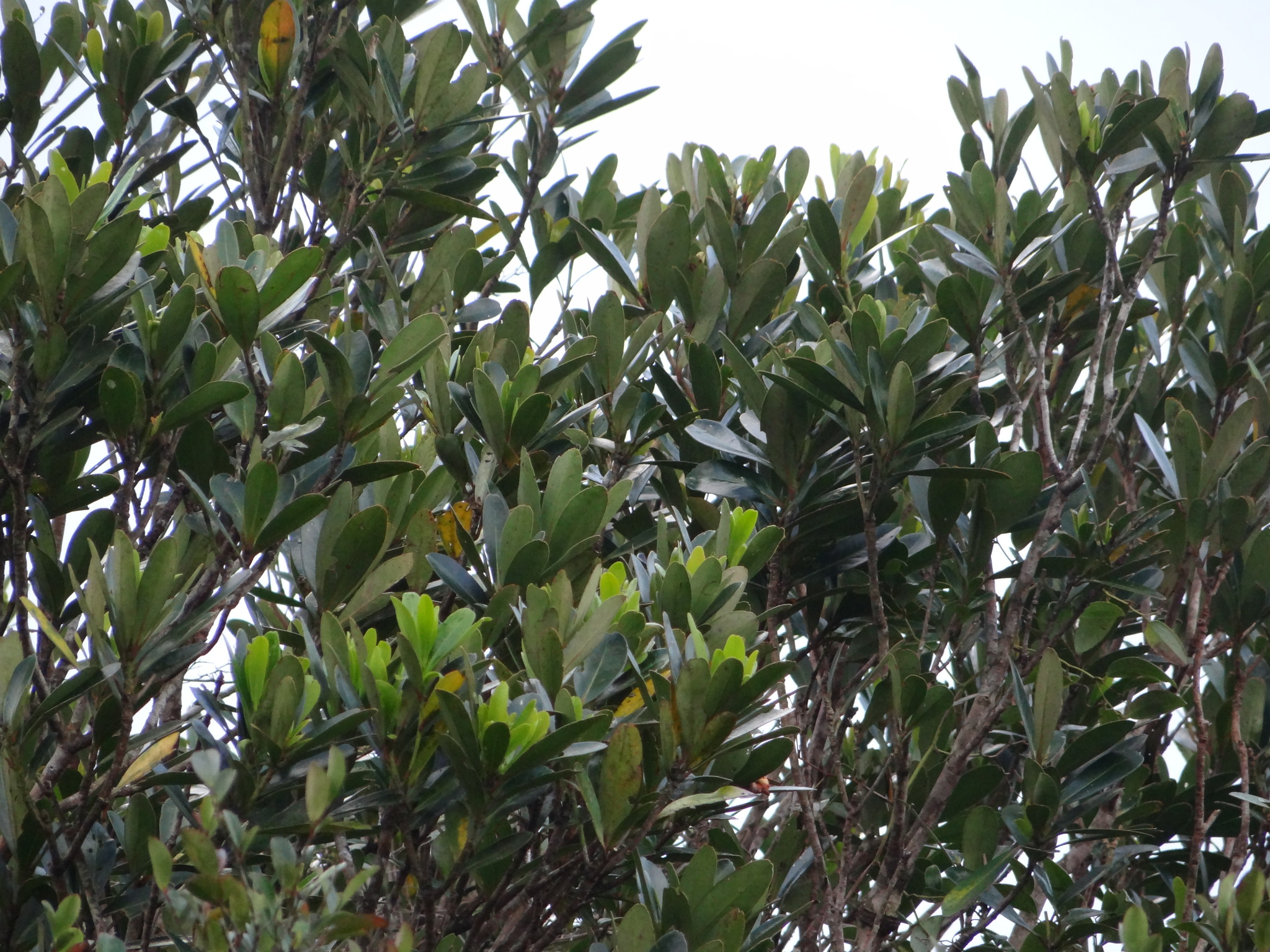

Conservation status
- Critically Endangered (IUCN 3.1)

Scientific classification
- Kingdom: Plantae
- Clade: Embryophytes
- Clade: Tracheophytes
- Clade: Spermatophytes
- Clade: Angiosperms
- Clade: Eudicots
- Clade: Rosids
- Order: Fagales
- Family: Fagaceae
- Genus: Lithocarpus
- Species: L. formosanus

Binomial name
- Lithocarpus formosanus (Skan) Hayata

Synonyms
- Pasania formosana (Skan) Schottky; Quercus formosana Skan; Synaedrys formosana (Skan) Koidz.

= Lithocarpus formosanus =

Species of tree

Lithocarpus formosanus is a species of tree in the family Fagaceae. L. formosanus is a medium-sized tree with crooked trunk and many branches. It is endemic to Taiwan as it only occurs in the Hengchun Peninsula in the extreme south of the country. It grows in mixed mesophytic forests at elevations of 100–500 m (330–1,640 ft). Only single population of fewer than 50 individuals survives.

The species was first described as Quercus formosana by Sidney Alfred Skan in 1899. In 1917 Bunzō Hayata placed the species in genus Lithocarpus as L. formosanus.

Lithocarpus formosanus is similar to L. dodonaeifolius, and their identity as separate species has been questioned. Molecular methods suggest that they are closely related but distinct species.
