= Cryptocarya chinensis =

- Leaves of Cryptocarya chinensis

Conservation status
- Least Concern (IUCN 3.1)

Scientific classification
- Kingdom: Plantae
- Clade: Tracheophytes
- Clade: Angiosperms
- Clade: Magnoliids
- Order: Laurales
- Family: Lauraceae
- Genus: Cryptocarya
- Species: C. chinensis

Binomial name
- Cryptocarya chinensis (Hance) Hemsl.

Synonyms
- Beilschmiedia chinensis Hance

Species of tree

Cryptocarya chinensis, commonly known as the Chinese cryptocarya, is a medium-sized evergreen tree native to the subtropical forests of Taiwan, southern China (Fujian, Guangdong, Guangxi, Hainan, Sichuan), Japan, the Ryukyu Islands, and Vietnam.

The species was first described as Beilschmiedia chinensis by Henry Fletcher Hance in 1882. In 1891 William Hemsley placed the species in genus Cryptocarya as C. chinensis.
