= Yuanlin (disambiguation) =

Yuanlin is a city in Changhua County, Taiwan.

Yuanlin may also refer to:

- Yuanlin Performance Hall, a performance center
- Yuanlin railway station, a railway station on the Taiwan Railways Administration West Coast line
- Yuanlin Community (园林社区), Kargilik Town, Kashgar, Xinjiang, China
- Yuanlin Community (园林社区), Shouxihu Subdistrict, Hanjiang District, Yangzhou, Jiangsu, China
- Yuanlin Subdistrict (园林街道), Qianjiang, Hubei Province, China
- Yuanlin Subdistrict (园林街道), Tiedong District, Anshan, Liaoning Province, China
- Yuanlin Village (員林里), Daya District, Taichung, Taiwan
- Chen Yuanlin (born 1957), Chinese electronic composer
- Qian Yuanlin (錢元琳, 899), fifteen son of Qian Liu with Lady Zhuangmu of Wuyue
- Zheng Yuanlin (born 1962), a lieutenant general (zhongjiang) of the People's Liberation Army (PLA)
