= Western Trunk line =

Railway line in Taiwan

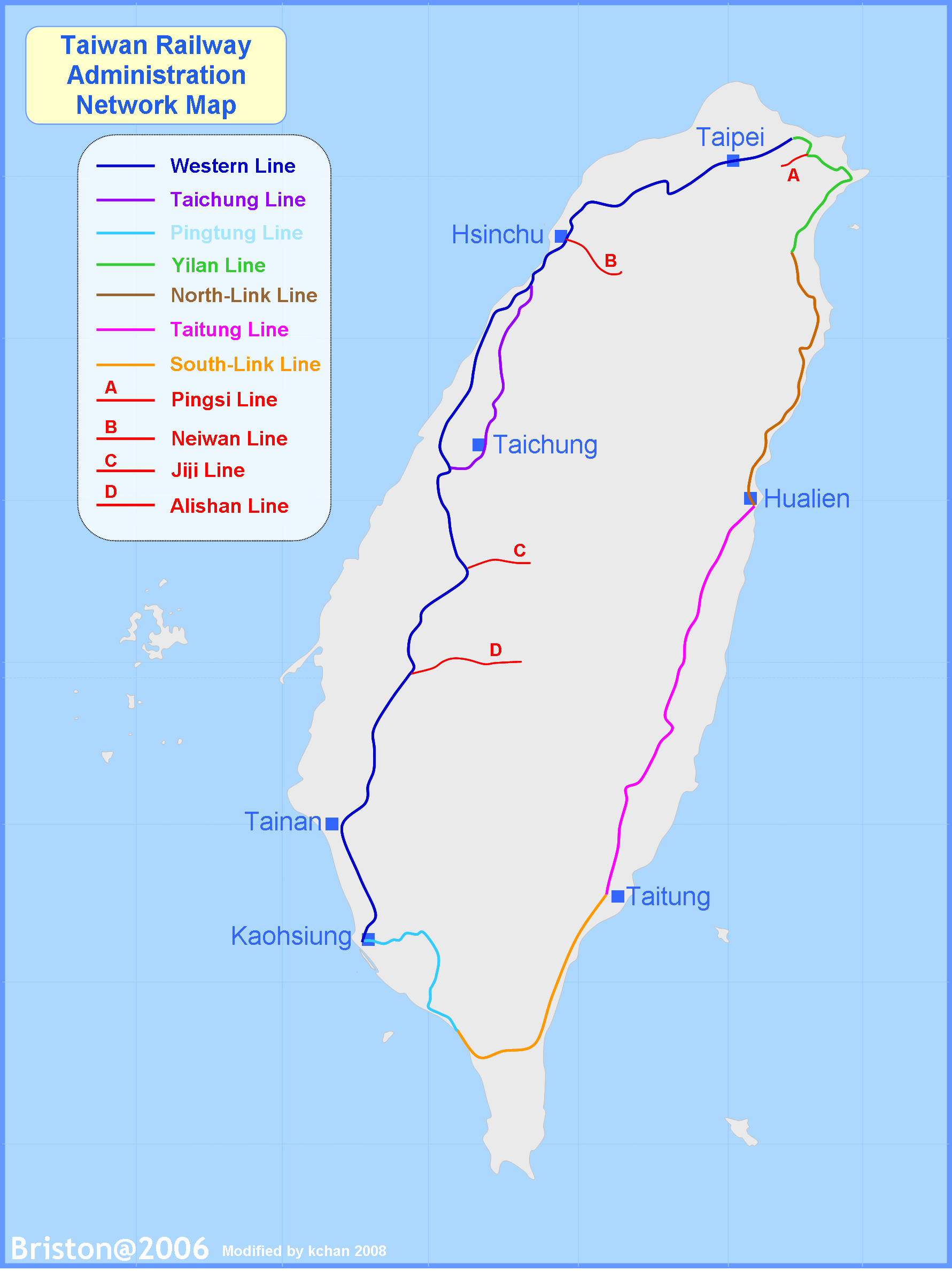
- Western Trunk line in blue

Overview
- Native name: 西部幹線
- Termini: Keelung; Pingtung
- Stations: 134

Service
- Type: Conventional railway
- Operator: Taiwan Railway Corporation

History
- Opened: 10 August 1902

Technical
- Line length: 420.8 km (261.5 mi) (Note: Keelung to Pingtung via Taichung)
- Num of tracks: 2 (predominantly)
- Track gauge: 3 ft 6 in (1,067 mm)
- Electrification: 25 kV/60 Hz catenary
- Operating speed: 130 km/h (81mph)

Western Trunk line (Chinese: 縱貫線; pinyin: Zòngguàn xiàn; Pe̍h-ōe-jī: Chhiòng-koàn sòaⁿ) is a railway line of Taiwan Railway in western Taiwan. It is by far the busiest line, having served over 171 million passengers in 2016. The total length of the line is 404.5 km (251.3 mi).

The line is an official classification of physical tracks and does not correspond to particular services. It is connected to Taichung line (mountain line; 山線) at Zhunan and Changhua. Many services turn inland to take the Taichung route, then reconnect back to the main line (West Coast line). Train schedules and departure boards mark either mountain or coastal (海線) line to indicate the route taken.

== History ==
The original railroad between Keelung and Twatutia was completed in 1891. The section between Twatutia and Hsinchu was finished in 1893. However, in the Japanese era, these sections were all rebuilt by the Government-General of Taiwan as part of its Taiwan Trunk Railway (縱貫鐵道, Jūkan Tetsudō) project. The Taiwan Trunk Railway was completed in 1908 with route from Kīrun (基隆, Keelung) through Taihoku (臺北, Taipei), Shinchiku (新竹, Hsinchu), Taichū (臺中, Taichung), Tainan (臺南, Tainan), to Takao (高雄, Kaohsiung).

The Taiwan Trunk Railway at that time went through all major cities in western Taiwan. However, the terrain around Taichū (Taichung) created a significant bottleneck for rail freight transport. To resolve this issue, the Government-General of Taiwan decided to build a Coastal Line (海岸線, Kaigan-sen) between Chikunan (竹南, Zhunan) and Shōka (彰化, Changhua) to relieve the congestion. The construction of the Coastal Line was started in 1919 and completed in 1922. The Coastal Line then became a part of the main West Coast Line, and the original railway through Taichū (Taichung) was named as a separate line (Taichung line). It was electrified in the late-1970s.

Due to service patterns, the following lines are often collectively referred to as the Western main line (Chinese: 西部幹線; Pe̍h-ōe-jī: Se-pō͘ Kàn-sòaⁿ)

Name	Chinese	Taiwanese	Hakka	Length	Terminus
West Coast line	縱貫線	Chhiòng-koàn Sòaⁿ	Chiúng-kon Sien	404.5 km (251.3 mi)	from Keelung to Kaohsiung
Taichung line	臺中線	Tâi-tiong Sòaⁿ	Thòi-chûng Sien	85.5 km (53.1 mi)	from Zhunan to Changhua (via Taichung)
Pingtung line	屏東線	Pîn-tong Sòaⁿ	Phìn-tûng Sien	61.3 km (38.1 mi)	from Kaohsiung to Fangliao

== Stations ==
Name	Chinese	Taiwanese	Hakka	Transfers and notes	Location	
Keelung	基隆	Ke-lâng	Kî-lùng		Ren'ai	Keelung
Sankeng	三坑	Saⁿ-kheⁿ	Sâm-hâng		Ren'ai	Keelung
Badu	八堵	Peh-tó͘	Pat-tú	→ Yilan line	Nuannuan	Keelung
Qidu	七堵	Chhit-tó͘	Chhit-tú		Qidu	Keelung
Baifu	百福	Pah-hok	Pak-fuk		Qidu	Keelung
Wudu	五堵	Gō͘-tó͘	Ńg-tú		Xizhi	New Taipei
Xizhi	汐止	Se̍k-chí	Sip-chṳ́		Xizhi	New Taipei
Xike	汐科	Se̍k-kho	Sip-khô		Xizhi	New Taipei
Nangang	南港	Lâm-káng	Nàm-kóng	Nangang; Nangang	Nangang	Taipei
Songshan	松山	Siông-san	Chhiùng-sân	Songshan	Songshan	Taipei
Taipei	臺北	Tâi-pak	Thòi-pet	Taipei Taipei Main; Beimen; Taipei Main (200m)	Zhongzheng	Taipei
Wanhua	萬華	Bān-hôa	Van-fà	Longshan Temple	Wanhua	Taipei
Banqiao	板橋	Pang-kiô	Pán-khiâu	Banqiao; Banqiao Banqiao	Banqiao	New Taipei
Fuzhou	浮洲	Phû-chiu	Feù-chû		Banqiao	New Taipei
Shulin	樹林	Chhiū-nâ	Su-lìm		Shulin	New Taipei
South Shulin	南樹林	Lâm-chhiū-nâ	Nàm Su-lìm		Shulin	New Taipei
Shanjia	山佳	Soaⁿ-á-kha	Sân-kâ		Shulin	New Taipei
Yingge	鶯歌	Eng-ko	Yîn-kô	Yingge	Yingge	New Taipei
Taoyuan (Note: Taoyuan Metro's Green Line is expected to have connection to this station once construction is complete.)	桃園	Thô-hn̂g	Thò-yèn		Taoyuan	Taoyuan
Neili	內壢	Lāi-le̍k	Nui-la̍k		Zhongli	Taoyuan
Zhongli	中壢	Tiong-le̍k	Chûng-la̍k	Zhongli (u/c)	Zhongli	Taoyuan
Puxin	埔心	Po͘-sim	Pu-sîm		Yangmei	Taoyuan
Yangmei	楊梅	Iûⁿ-mûi	Yòng-mòi		Yangmei	Taoyuan
Fugang	富岡	Hù-kong	Fu-kông		Yangmei	Taoyuan
Xinfu	新富	Sin-hù	Sîn-fu		Yangmei	Taoyuan
Beihu	北湖	Pak-ô͘	Pet-fù		Hukou	Hsinchu; County
Hukou	湖口	Ô͘-kháu	Fù-khiéu		Hukou	Hsinchu; County
Xinfeng	新豐	Sin-hong	Sîn-fûng		Xinfeng	Hsinchu; County
Zhubei	竹北	Tek-pak	Chuk-pet		Zhubei	Hsinchu; County
North Hsinchu	北新竹	Pak Sin-tek	Pet Sîn-chuk	→ Neiwan line	East	Hsinchu
Hsinchu	新竹	Sin-tek	Sîn-chuk	→ Neiwan line	East	Hsinchu
Sanxingqiao	三姓橋	Saⁿ-sèⁿ-kiô	Sâm-siang-khiâu		Xiangshan	Hsinchu
Xiangshan	香山	Hiong-san	Hiông-sân		Xiangshan	Hsinchu
Qiding	崎頂	Kiā-téng	Khi-táng		Zhunan	Miaoli; County
Zhunan	竹南	Tek-lâm	Chuk-nàm	→ Taichung line	Zhunan	Miaoli; County
Tanwen	談文	Tâm-bûn	Thàm-vùn		Zaoqiao	Miaoli; County
Dashan	大山	Tōa-soaⁿ	Thai-sân		Houlong	Miaoli; County
Houlong	後龍	Āu-lâng	Heu-liùng		Houlong	Miaoli; County
Longgang	龍港	Lêng-káng	Liùng-kóng		Houlong	Miaoli; County
Baishatun	白沙屯	Pe̍h-soa-tūn	Pha̍k-sâ-thûn		Tongxiao	Miaoli; County
Xinpu	新埔	Sin-po͘	Sîn-phû		Tongxiao	Miaoli; County
Tongxiao	通霄	Thong-siau	Thûng-siau		Tongxiao	Miaoli; County
Yuanli	苑裡	Oán-lí	Yén-lî		Yuanli	Miaoli; County
Rinan	日南	Ji̍t-lâm	Ngit-nàm		Dajia	Taichung
Dajia	大甲	Tāi-kah	Thai-kap		Dajia	Taichung
Taichung Port	臺中港	Tâi-tiong-káng	Thòi-chûng-kóng		Qingshui	Taichung
Qingshui	清水	Chheng-chúi	Chhîn-súi		Qingshui	Taichung
Shalu	沙鹿	Soa-lak	Sâ-lu̍k		Shalu	Taichung
Longjing	龍井	Liông-chéⁿ	Liùng-chiáng		Longjing	Taichung
Dadu	大肚	Tōa-tō͘	Thai-tú		Dadu	Taichung
Zhuifen	追分	Tui-hun	Tûi-fûn	→ Chengzhui line (to Taichung line)	Dadu	Taichung
Changhua	彰化	Chiong-hoà	Chông-fa	→ Taichung line	Changhua	Changhua; County
Huatan	花壇	Hoe-toâⁿ	Fâ-thàn		Huatan	Changhua; County
Dacun	大村	Tāi-chhoan	Thai-chhûn		Dacun	Changhua; County
Yuanlin	員林	Oân-lîm	Yèn-lìm		Yuanlin	Changhua; County
Yongjing	永靖	Éng-chēng	Yún-chhìn		Yongjing	Changhua; County
Shetou	社頭	Siā-thâu	Sa-theù		Shetou	Changhua; County
Tianzhong	田中	Tiân-tiong	Thièn-chûng		Tianzhong	Changhua; County
Ershui	二水	Jī-chúi	Ngi-súi	→ Jiji line	Ershui	Changhua; County
Linnei	林內	Nâ-lāi	Lìm-nui		Linnei	Yunlin; County
Shiliu	石榴	Chio̍h-liû	Sa̍k-liû		Douliu	Yunlin; County
Douliu	斗六	Táu-la̍k	Teú-liuk		Douliu	Yunlin; County
Dounan	斗南	Táu-lâm	Teú-nàm		Dounan	Yunlin; County
Shigui	石龜	Chio̍h-ku	Sa̍k-kuî		Dounan	Yunlin; County
Dalin	大林	Tōa-nâ	Thai-lìm		Dalin	Chiayi; County
Minxiong	民雄	Bîn-hiông	Mìn-hiùng		Minxiong	Chiayi; County
Jiabei	嘉北	Ka-pak	Kâ-pet		East	Chiayi
Chiayi	嘉義	Ka-gī	Kâ-ngi	Alishan Forest Railway	West	Chiayi
Shuishang	水上	Chúi-siōng	Súi-sông		Shuishang	Chiayi; County
Nanjing	南靖	Lâm-chēng	Nàm-chhìn		Shuishang	Chiayi; County
Houbi	後壁	Āu-piah	Heu-piak		Houbi	Tainan
Xinying	新營	Sin-iâⁿ	Sîn-yàng		Xinying	Tainan
Liuying	柳營	Liú-iâⁿ	Liú-yàng		Liouying	Tainan
Linfengying	林鳳營	Lîm-hōng-iâⁿ	Lìm-fung-yàng		Lioujia	Tainan
Longtian	隆田	Liông-tiân	Lùng-thièn		Guantian	Tainan
Balin	拔林	Pa̍t-á-nâ	Pha̍t-lìm		Guantian	Tainan
Shanhua	善化	Siān-hòa	San-fa		Shanhua	Tainan
Nanke	南科	Lâm-kho	Nàm-khô		Xinshi	Tainan
Xinshi	新市	Sin-chhī	Sîn-sṳ		Xinshi	Tainan
Yongkang	永康	Éng-khong	Yún-không		Yongkang	Tainan
Daqiao	大橋	Tōa-kiô	Thai-khiâu		Yongkang	Tainan
Tainan	臺南	Tâi-lâm	Thòi-nàm		East	Tainan
Bao'an	保安	Pó-an	Pó-ôn		Rende	Tainan
Rende	仁德	Jîn-tek	Yìn-tet		Rende	Tainan
Zhongzhou	中洲	Tiong-chiu	Chûng-chû	→ Shalun line	Rende	Tainan
Dahu	大湖	Tōa-ô͘	Thai-fù		Lujhu	Kaohsiung
Luzhu	路竹	Lō͘-tek	Lu-chuk		Lujhu	Kaohsiung
Gangshan	岡山	Kong-san	Kông-sân	Gangshan	Gangshan	Kaohsiung
Qiaotou	橋頭	Kiô-á-thâu	Khiâu-thèu	Ciaotou	Ciaotou	Kaohsiung
Nanzi	楠梓	Lâm-á-kheⁿ	Nâm-chṳ́		Nanzi	Kaohsiung
Xinzuoying	新左營	Sin-chó-iâⁿ	Sîn-chó-yàng	Zuoying; Zuoying/THSR	Zuoying	Kaohsiung
Zuoying–Jiucheng	左營·舊城	Chó-iâⁿ (Kū-siâⁿ)	Chó-yàng (Khiu-sàng)		Zuoying	Kaohsiung
Neiwei	內惟	Lāi-ûi	Nui-vì		Gushan	Kaohsiung
Museum of Fine Arts	美術館	Bí-su̍t-koán	Mî-su̍t-kón	TRA Museum of Fine Arts Station	Gushan	Kaohsiung
Gushan	鼓山	Kó͘-san		Gushan	Gushan	Kaohsiung
Sankuaicuo	三塊厝	Saⁿ-tè-chhù	Sân-khoài-chhṳ̀		Sanmin	Kaohsiung
Kaohsiung	高雄	Ko-hiông	Kô-hiùng	→ Pingtung line Kaohsiung Main	Sanmin	Kaohsiung
