= Huatan (disambiguation) =

Huatan is a rural township in Changhua County, Taiwan.

Huatan may also refer to:

- Huatan railway station, a railway station on the Taiwan Railways Administration West Coast line
- Huatan Town (花滩镇), Changning County, Sichuan Province, China
- Huatan Town (花滩镇), Yingjing County, Sichuan Province, China
