= Dacun (disambiguation) =

Dacun (大村) is a rural township in Changhua County, Taiwan.

Dacun may also refer to:

- Dacun railway station, a railway station on the Taiwan Railways Administration West Coast line
- Dacun Town (大村镇), Huangdao, Qingdao, Shandong, China
- Dacun Township (大村乡), Nangong, Hebei Province, China
- Dacun Village (大村村), Minle, Jinggu County, Yunnan Province, China
- Dacun Village (大村村), Yanchi, Beijing, China
- Dacun Village (大村里), Wuqi District, Taichung, Taiwan

== See also ==
- Hong Dacun (洪大存; Hóng Dàcún), a character in Liang Yusheng's novel Datang Youxia
- Davao Colleges and Universities Network simply called as “DACUN”, see University of the Philippines Mindanao
