= HKU (disambiguation) =

HKU may refer to:

- University of Hong Kong
  - HKU station, a metro station near the University of Hong Kong
- Hsing-Kuo University, the former name of CTBC Business School in Tainan, Taiwan
- Hungkuang University, in Taichung, Taiwan
- Utrecht School of the Arts (Dutch: Hogeschool voor de Kunsten Utrecht)
