= Baima Temple =

The Baima Temple may refer to:

- White Horse Temple, Luoyang, Henan, China
- Baima Temple (Taiwan), Linnei, Yunlin, Taiwan
