= Jye =

Jye can refer to:

- Jye (given name), masculine given name
- Judeo-Yemeni Arabic (ISO 639: jye), variety of Arabic spoken by Yemeni Jews
