= Lo Tsai-jen =

Taiwanese businessman

- Education: Newark College of Engineering (BS)
- Father: Luo Jye

Lo Tsai-jen (Chinese: 羅才仁) is a Taiwanese businessman, the chairman and general manager of Cheng Shin Rubber, founded by his father Luo Jye.

Lo is the second son of Luo Jye. He earned a bachelor's degree from the Newark College of Engineering.

In June 2014, Lo succeeded his father Luo Jye as chairman of Cheng Shin Rubber, having been vice-chairman since 2010, and general manager before that.
