= 大村 =

大村 may refer to:

- Dacun Township, rural township in Changhua County, Taiwan
- Ōmura, Nagasaki, a city located in Nagasaki Prefecture, Japan
