= Yuanlin railway station =

Railway station in Changhua, Taiwan

Yuanlin 員林
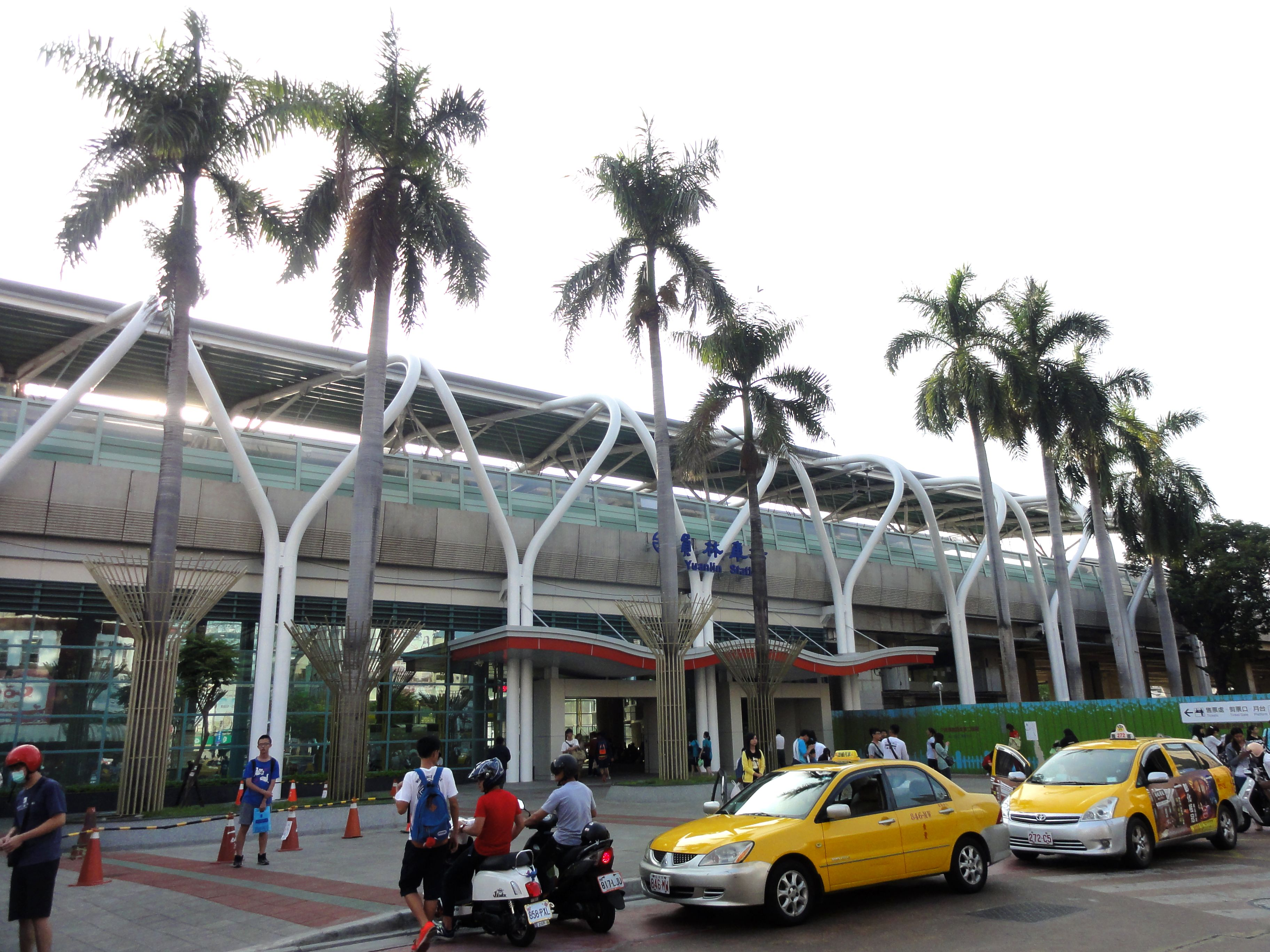

Chinese name
- Traditional Chinese: 員林
Transcriptions
Standard Mandarin
- Hanyu Pinyin: Yuánlín
- Bopomofo: ㄩㄢˊ ㄌㄧㄣˊ

General information
- Location: 55 Minquan St, Yuanlin, Changhua County, Taiwan
- Coordinates: 23.9592°N 120.5696°E
- System: Taiwan Railway railway station
- Line: Western Trunk line
- Distance: 225.6 km to Keelung via Taichung
- Connections: Local bus (350 m); Coach (350 m)

Construction
- Structure type: Elevated

Other information
- Station code: A51 (statistical)
- Classification: First class (Chinese: 一等)
- Website: www.railway.gov.tw/yuanlin/index.aspx (in Chinese)

History
- Opened: 1905-03-26
- Rebuilt: 2014-11-24
- Electrified: 1978-12-19

Key dates
- 1949-09: Rebuilt
- 1961-05: Rebuilt
- 2003-01-23: Rebuilt

Passengers
- 2017: 6.186 million per year ▲2.87%
- Rank: 21 out of 228

Services
Preceding station	Taiwan Railway	Following station
Dacun towards Keelung	Western Trunk line	Yongjing towards Kaohsiung
Location
- Location within Taiwan

Yuanlin (Chinese: 員林; pinyin: Yuánlín) is a railway station in Changhua County, Taiwan served by Taiwan Railway.

== Overview ==
The original station had one island platform and one side platform. The station underwent construction and was converted into an elevated station in 2014.

== Current platform diagram ==
Elevated level	Platform 2B	TR West Coast line toward Changhua, Taichung (Dacun)
Elevated level	Island platform
Elevated level	Platform 2A	TR West Coast line toward Changhua, Taichung (Dacun)
Elevated level	Platform 1B	TR West Coast line toward Tainan, Kaohsiung (Yongjing)
Elevated level	Island platform
Elevated level	Platform 1A	TR West Coast line toward Tainan, Kaohsiung (Yongjing)
Elevated level	Street level	Entrance/exit

== Original platform diagram ==
1	1A	■ West Coast line (southbound)	Toward Douliu, Chiayi, Tainan, Kaohsiung
1	1A	■ South-link line (southbound)	Toward Fangliao, Taitung
1	1A	■ Jiji line (southbound)	Toward Jiji, Checheng
2	1B	■ West Coast line (northbound)	Toward Changhua, Taichung, Shalu, Dajia; Hsinchu, Taipei, Keelung
2	1B	■ Eastern line (Cross-line southbound)	Toward Suao, Hualien, Taitung

== History ==
- 1905-03-26: The station opens for service.
- 1961-03-28: A new, concrete station opens for service.
- 2007-09-01: The Yuanlin Elevated Railway Project begins construction.
- 2008-03-11: The station becomes a stop on the Taroko Express.
- 2009-06-29: The elevated track of Yuanlin Elevated Railway Project begins construction.
- 2014-11-02: Current station opens.

== Around the station ==
- Chung Chou University of Science and Technology
- Yuanlin Performance Hall
- Yuanlin City Office
- Yuanlin High School
- Yuanlin Agricultural and Industrial Vocational High School
- Yuanlin Transfer Station

== See also ==
- List of railway stations in Taiwan
