= Saint Cross Church =

Church in Houbi, Tainan, Taiwan

- 菁寮聖十字架天主堂
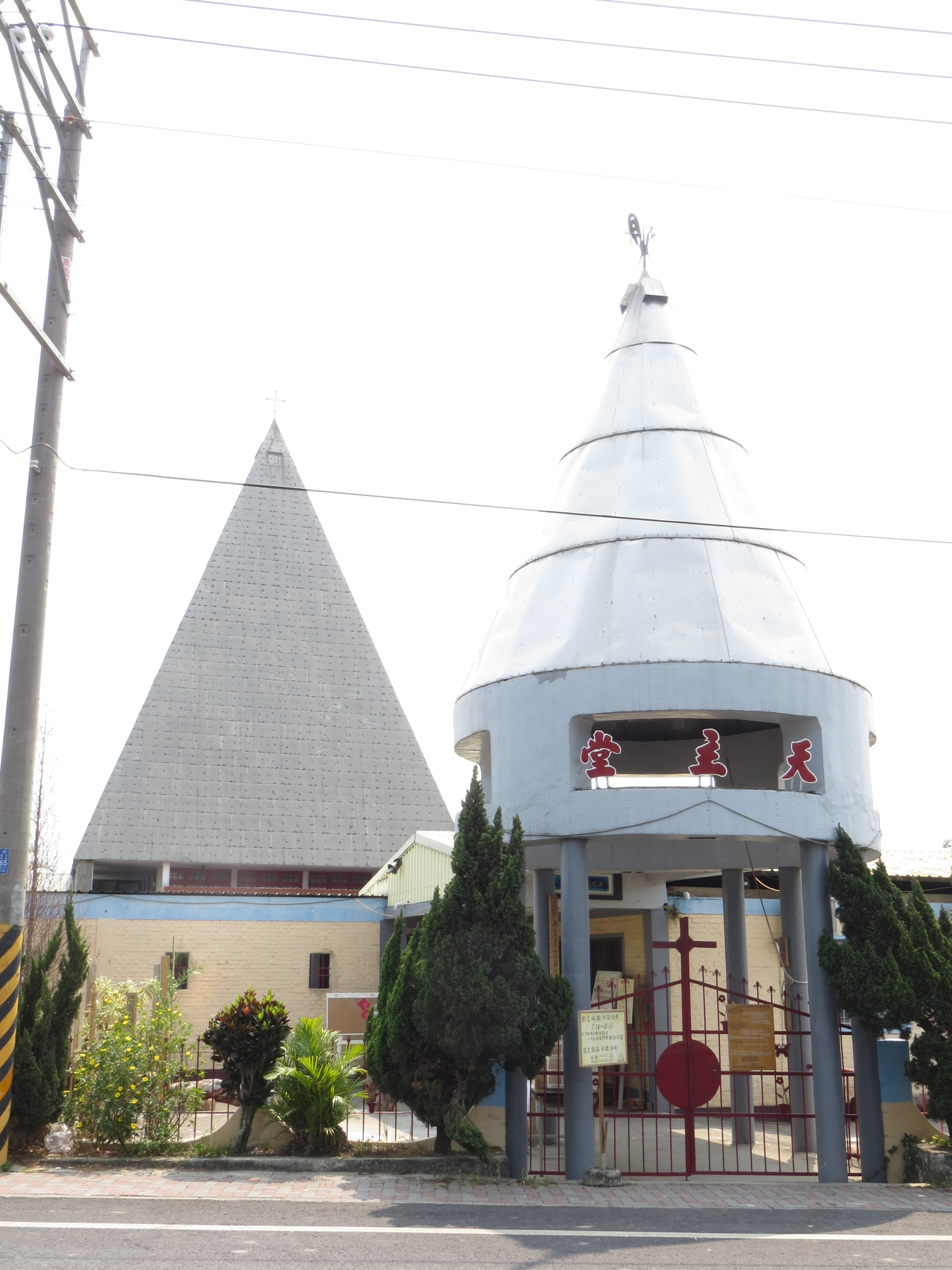
- Saint Cross Church
- 23°22′42.0″N 120°20′23.2″E
- Location: Houbi, Tainan, Taiwan
- Denomination: Catholic

Architecture
- Architect: Gottfried Böhm
- Architectural type: church

Jingliao Holy Cross Church or Saint Cross Church (traditional Chinese: 菁寮聖十字架天主堂; simplified Chinese: 菁寮圣十字架天主堂; pinyin: Jīngliáoshèng Shízìjià Tiānzhǔtáng) is a church in Jingliao Village, Houbi District, Tainan, Taiwan.

== History ==
The church was designed in the 1950s. In 1955, the German priest Eric Jansen who was stationed in the village decided to build a Catholic church.

== Architecture ==
Designed by the German architect Gottfried Böhm, the church building consists of four parts, which are the pyramidal chapel, the conical bell tower, the basilica and the holy shrine. Towers of the four parts were built with aluminum-covered cypress. At each of the tower tip lies a representative totem. The church features a dormitory and a kindergarten within the same compound. The church has also a small museum depicting the history of the church from its founding.

== See also ==
- List of tourist attractions in Taiwan
- Christianity in Taiwan
