= Linnei railway station =

Railway station in Yunlin, Taiwan

Linnei 林內車站
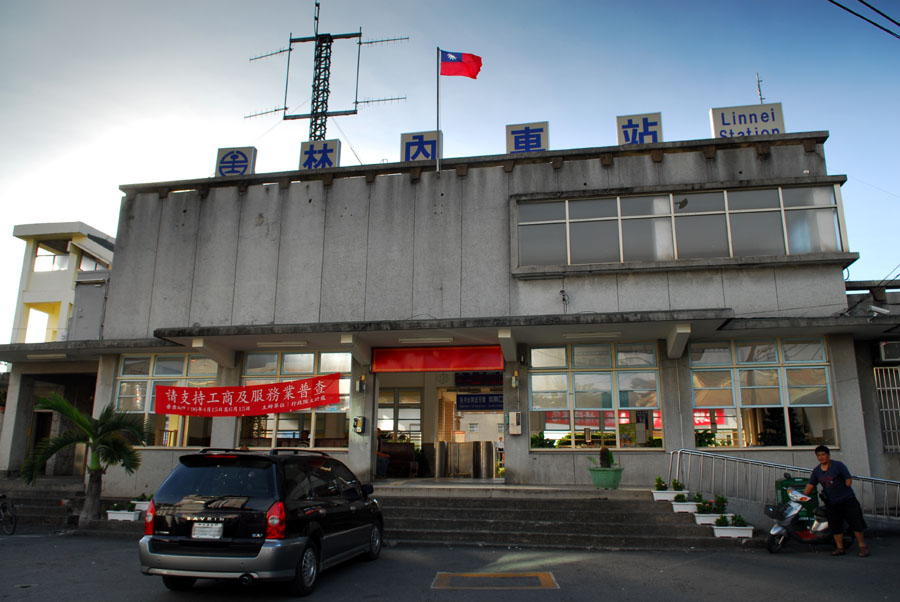

General information
- Location: Linnei, Yunlin County, Taiwan
- Coordinates: 23°45′36.0″N 120°36′53″E
- System: Train station
- Owner: Taiwan Railway Corporation
- Operator: Taiwan Railway Corporation
- Line: West Coast
- Train operators: Taiwan Railway Corporation

History
- Opened: 20 June 1907

Passengers
- 1,614 daily (2024)
Location

Linnei (Chinese: 林內車站; pinyin: Línnèi Chēzhàn) is a railway station on the Taiwan Railway West Coast line located in Linnei Township, Yunlin County, Taiwan.

== History ==
The station was opened in 1907.

== Around the station ==
- Farming and Irrigation Artifacts Museum

== See also ==
- List of railway stations in Taiwan

Preceding station	Taiwan Railway	Following station
Ershui towards Keelung	Western Trunk line	Shiliu towards Pingtung
