= Jingliao Huang Family Mansion =

Former residence in Houbi, Tainan, Taiwan

- 菁寮黃宅
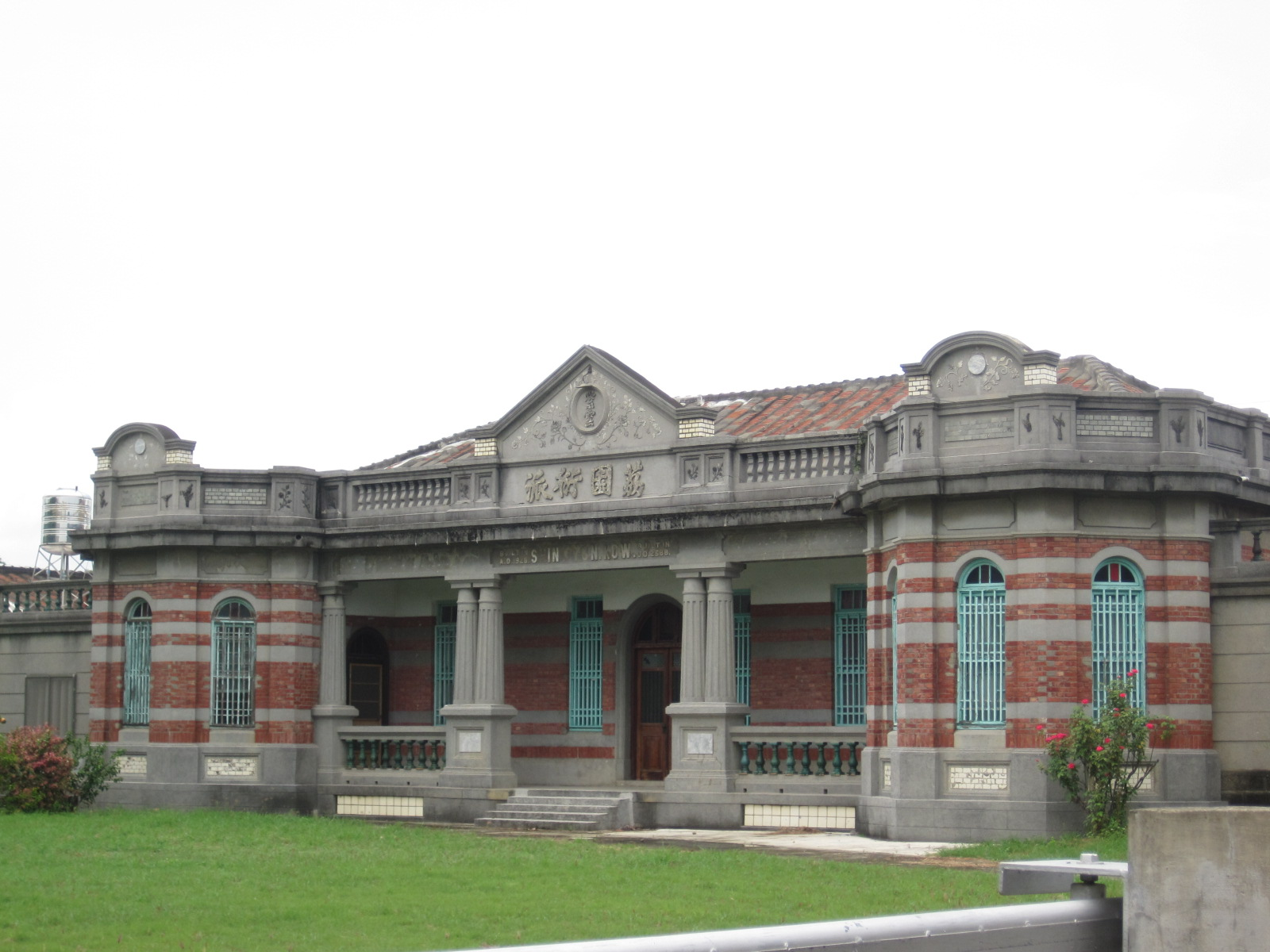
- Interactive map of the Jingliao Huang Family Mansion area

General information
- Type: former house
- Architectural style: Southern Min
- Location: Houbi, Tainan, Taiwan
- Coordinates: 23°21′54.1″N 120°21′42.2″E
- Opened: 1928

The Jingliao Huang Family Mansion (Chinese: 菁寮黃宅; pinyin: Jīngliáo Huángzhái) is a historical house in Houbi District, Tainan, Taiwan.

== History ==
The house was built in 1928.

== Architecture ==
The facade of the house is a renaissance style and the house building is a Southern Min style. It is a symmetric structure with five paneled facades. The front side has two columns and a terrazzo fire wall. Both sides of the halls are octagon shape and the side wings are protected with fire walls. The back side is fenced and the back wing is protected with fire wall.

== See also ==
- List of tourist attractions in Taiwan
