= Farming and Irrigation Artifacts Museum =

Museum in Linnei, Yunlin, Taiwan

- 農田水利文物陳列館
- Established: 10 December 2016
- Location: Linnei, Yunlin, Taiwan
- Coordinates: 23°46′49.6″N 120°36′56.5″E
- Type: museum
- Public transit access: Linnei Station

The Farming and Irrigation Artifacts Museum (simplified Chinese: 农田水利文物陈列馆; traditional Chinese: 農田水利文物陳列館; pinyin: Nóngtián Shuǐlì Wénwù Chénliè Guǎn) is a museum in Linnei Township, Yunlin County, Taiwan.

== Exhibitions ==
The museum exhibits traditional irrigation techniques and their history.

== Transportation ==
The museum is accessible within walking distance north of Linnei Station of Taiwan Railway.

== See also ==
- List of museums in Taiwan
