= Houbi railway station =

Railway station located in Tainan, Taiwan

Houbi Station 後壁車站
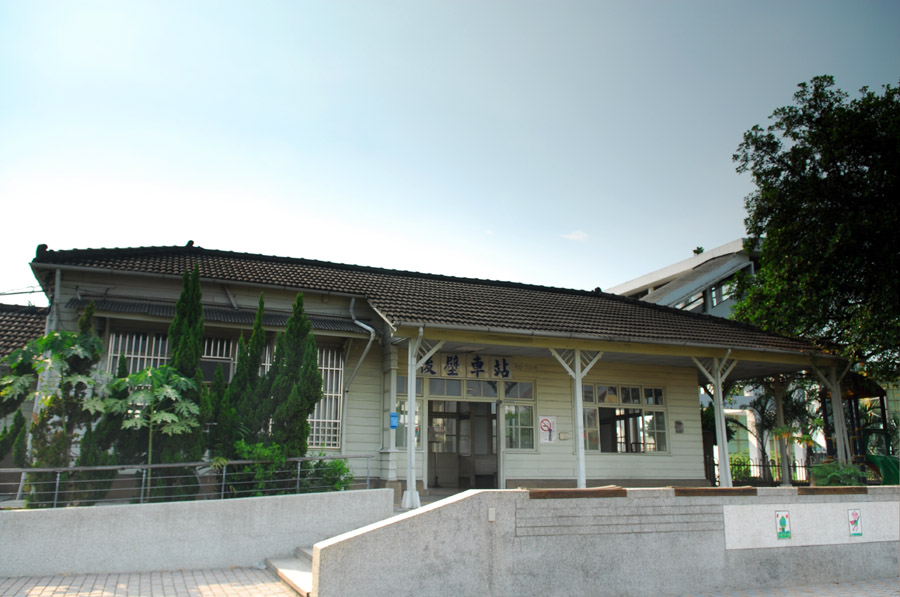

General information
- Location: Houbi, Tainan, Taiwan
- Coordinates: 23°21′58.4″N 120°21′37.4″E
- Owner: Taiwan Railway
- Operator: Taiwan Railway
- Line: West Coast
- Train operators: Taiwan Railway

History
- Opened: 20 April 1903

Passengers
- 1,196 daily (2024)
Location

Houbi (Chinese: 後壁車站; pinyin: Hòubì Chēzhàn) is a railway station on Taiwan Railway West Coast line located in Houbi District, Tainan, Taiwan.

== History ==
The station was opened on 20 April 1903.

== Architecture ==
The station is a wooden structure.

== Around the station ==
- Houbi Huang Family Mansion

== See also ==
- List of railway stations in Taiwan

Preceding station	Taiwan Railway	Following station
Nanjing towards Keelung	Western Trunk line	Xinying towards Pingtung
