= Maxxis =

Tire manufacturer

- Company type: Public
- Traded as: TWSE: 2105
- Founded: January 1, 1967; 59 years ago
- Founder: Luo Jye
- Headquarters: Yuanlin, Taiwan
- Area served: Worldwide
- Website: www.maxxis.com

Cheng Shin Rubber Industry Co. (Chinese: 正新橡膠工業股份有限公司; pinyin: Zhèngxīn Xiàngjiāo Gōngyè Gǔfèn Yǒuxiàn Gōngsī) is a Taiwanese tire company which is the 16th largest in the world. Established in 1967, in Yuanlin City, Changhua County, Taiwan, by Luo Jye. Maxxis Tyres and CST tires are wholly owned subsidiaries of Cheng Shin.

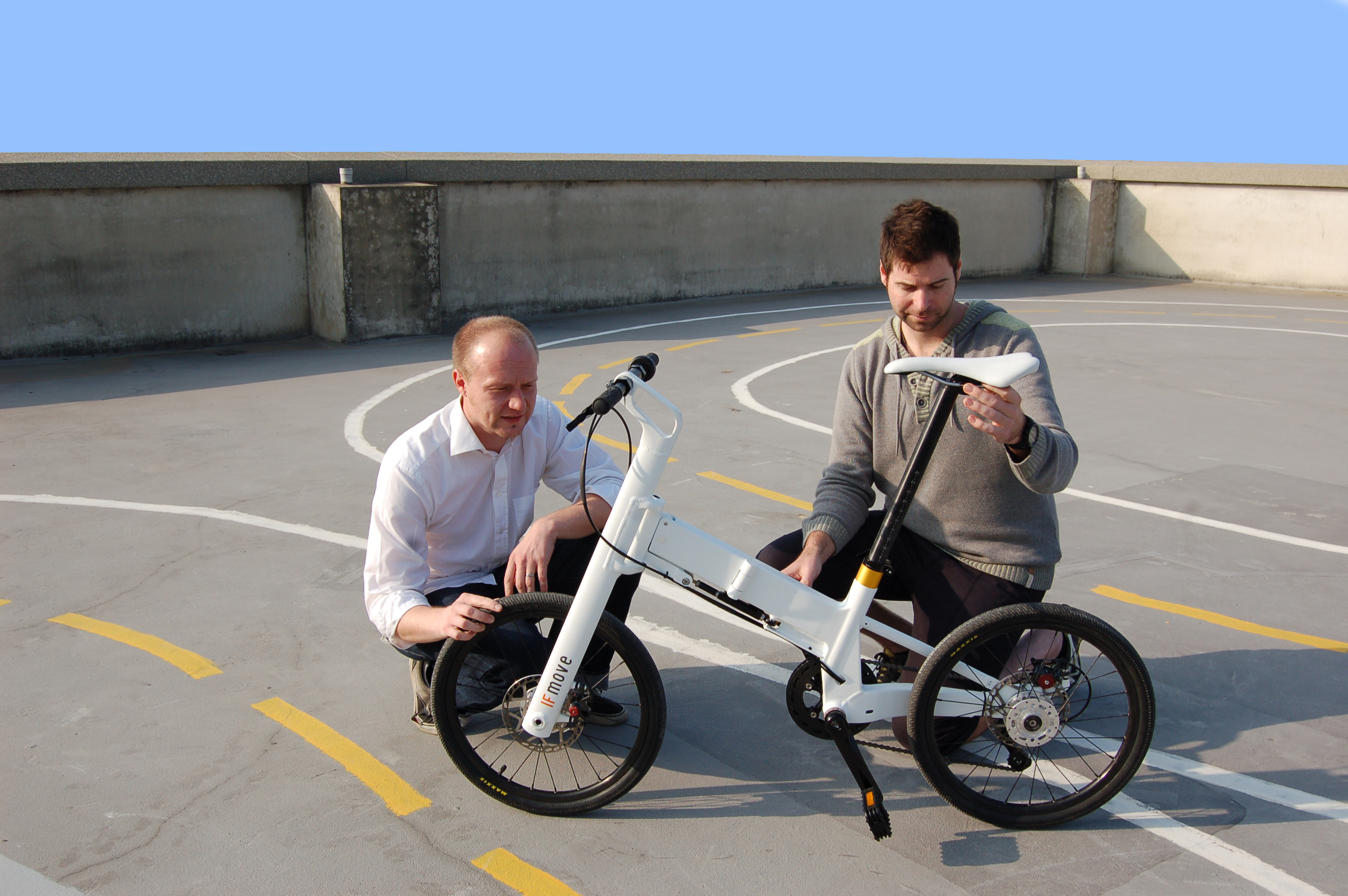
Maxxis tires used on a Taiwanese bike.

The company began as a producer of bicycle tyres and has since expanded into other types of tyres, including for motor vehicles. In 2015 Cheng Shin had worldwide revenue of over $3.85 billion.

== See also ==
- List of companies of Taiwan
