= Jye (given name) =

Jye is a masculine given name. Notable people with the name include:

- Jye Amiss (born 2003), Australian rules footballer
- Jye Bolton (born 1992), Australian rules footballer
- Jye Caldwell (born 2000), Australian rules footballer
- Jye Dixon (born 2005), Australian boxer
- Jye Edwards (born 1998), Australian middle-distance runner
- Jye Etheridge (born 1995), Australian motorcycle speedway rider
- Jye Gray (born 2004), Australian rugby league footballer
- Lee Jye, Taiwanese politician
- Luo Jye (1925–2019), Taiwanese founder
- Jye McNeil (born 1994), Australian jockey
- Jye Menzie (born 2002), Australian rules footballer
- Jye Mullane (born 1981), Australian rugby league footballer
