= Chung Chou University of Science and Technology =

Private university in Changhua County, Taiwan

- 中州科技大學
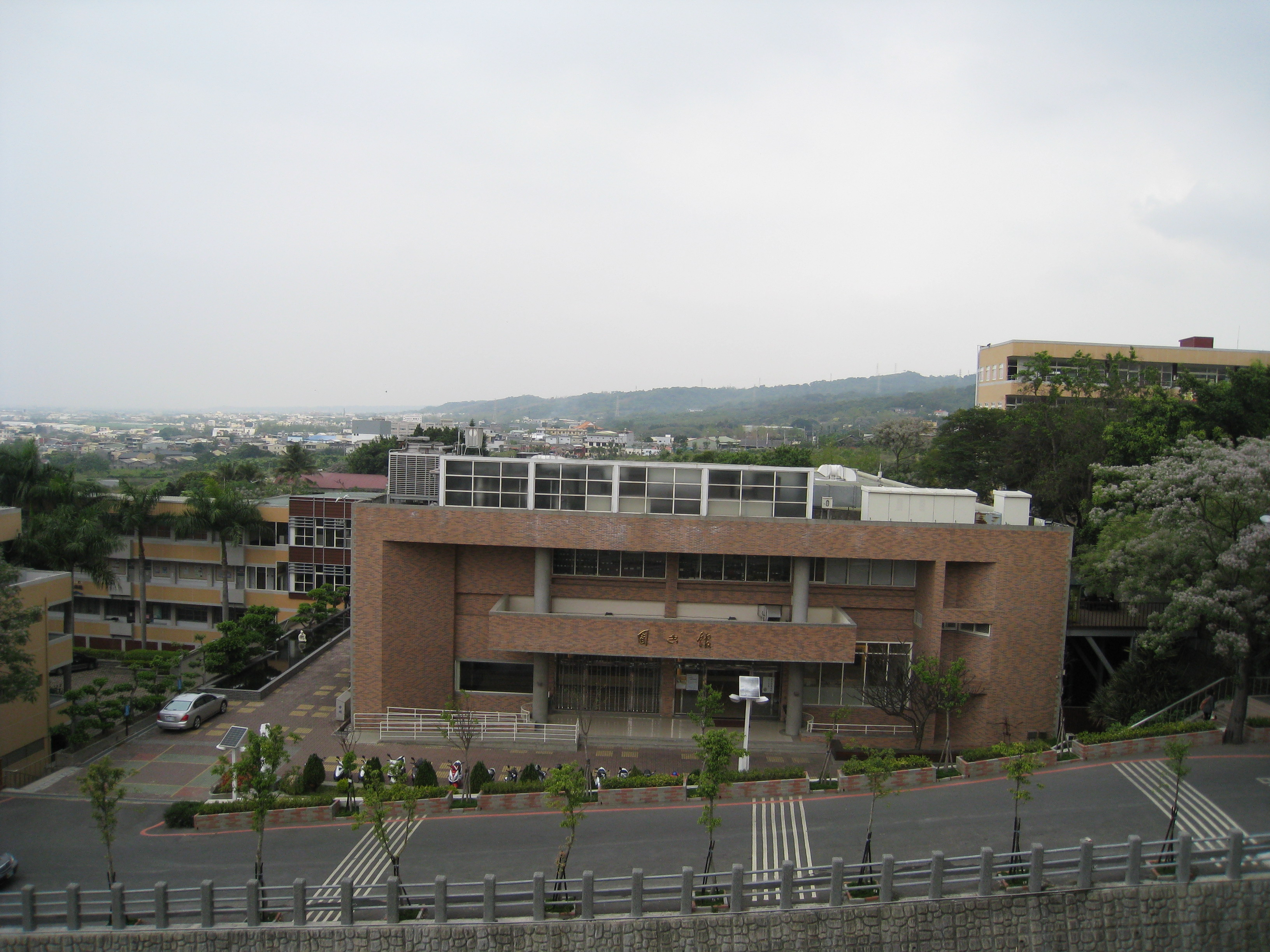
- Former names: Chung Chou Vocational Institute of Engineering; Chung Chou Junior College of Technology; Chung Chou Institute of Technology
- Motto: 精、公、誠、毅
- Type: private university
- Active: 1969 (as Chung Chou Vocational Institute of Engineering); August 1, 2011 (as CCUT)–July 31, 2023
- President: Huang Sy-ruen
- Vice-president: Chai Un-chin
- Location: Yuanlin, Changhua County, Taiwan; 23°57′28.0″N 120°36′21.3″E
- Website: Official website

Chung Chou University of Science and Technology
- Traditional Chinese: 中州科技大學
- Simplified Chinese: 中州科技大学
Transcriptions
Standard Mandarin
- Hanyu Pinyin: Zhōngzhōu Kējì Dàxué
Southern Min
- Hokkien POJ: Tiong-chiu Kho-ki Tāi-ha̍k

Chung Chou University of Science and Technology (CCUT; Chinese: 中州科技大學; Pe̍h-ōe-jī: Tiong-chiu Kho-ki Tāi-ha̍k) was a private university located in Yuanlin City, Changhua County, Taiwan. The school was closed due to the illegal worker incident.

== History ==
CCUT was originally established as Chung Chou Vocational Institute of Engineering in 1969. In 1991, the school name was changed to Chung Chou Junior College of Technology and in 2000, the name was changed again to Chung Chou Institute of Technology. It was finally renamed the Chung Chou University of Science and Technology on 1 August 2011. In 2015, the university had been put under observation for quality issues.

=== International student exploitation ===
In January 2022, The Reporter reported CCUT luring overseas students to Taiwan illegally. The students, who were found through brokers had to commit to paying higher tuition fees and were forced to work overtime in factories to pay back these fees. The college promised to provide English courses and scholarships to international students. Once the students signed up, the classes turned out to be taught fully in Chinese, and the students were required to get high scores to be qualified for any scholarship. When one of the students changed his school, the college threatened the student with governmental deportation measures.

In response to the incident, the principal was resigned and officials were arrested. The Ministry of Education ordered the college to stop admissions.

In November 2022, the college announced the school would be closed after July 31, 2023. On August 1, 2023, the school was formally closed.

== Faculties ==
- College of Engineering
- College of Health
- College of Management

== Transportation ==
The university is accessible within walking distance East from Yuanlin Station of the Taiwan Railway.

== See also ==
- List of universities in Taiwan
