= Houbi Huang Family Mansion =

Former house in Houbi, Tainan, Taiwan

- 後壁黃家古厝
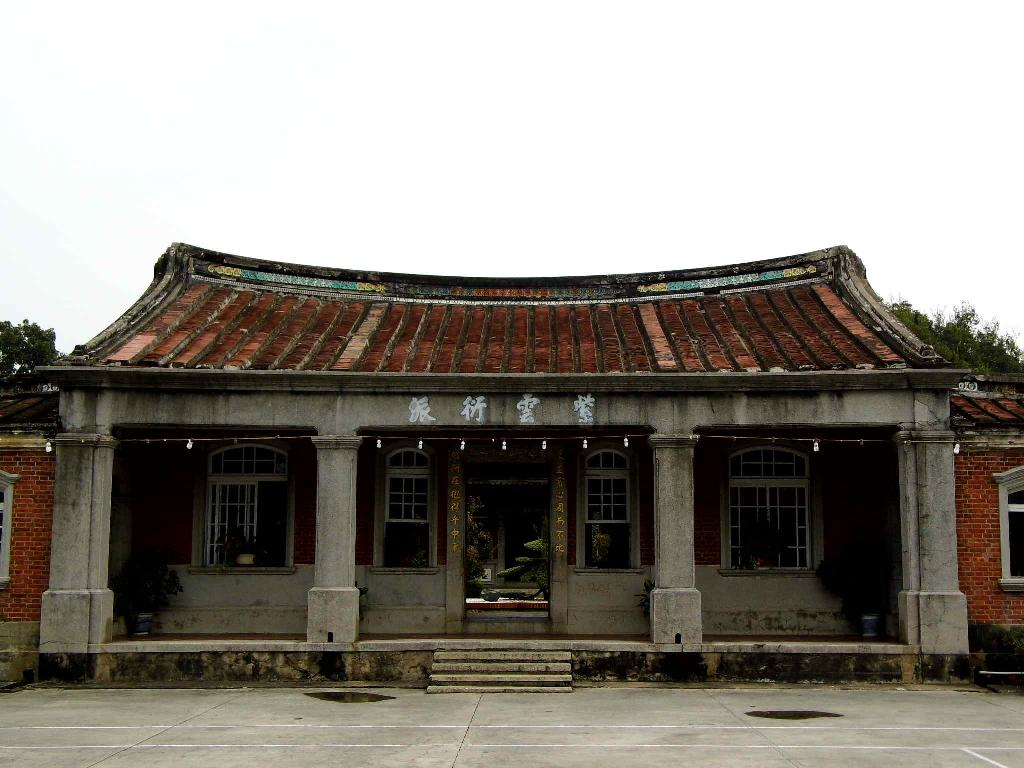
- Interactive map of the Houbi Huang Family Mansion area

General information
- Type: former house
- Architectural style: Southern Min
- Location: Houbi, Tainan, Taiwan
- Coordinates: 23°21′53.6″N 120°21′42.0″E
- Construction started: 1924
- Completed: 1927

Technical details
- Grounds: 2 hectares

The Houbi Huang Family Mansion (Chinese: 後壁黃家古厝; pinyin: Hòubì Huáng Jiāgǔcuò) is a historical house in Houbi District, Tainan, Taiwan.

== History ==
The mansion began its construction in 1924 and completed in 1926. In 2008, the house was declared a historic site of Tainan County by the county government. In 2010, the Huang Family Historic House Cultural Arts Foundation was established to preserve the building.

== Architecture ==
The mansion was designed with Southern Min style on top of 2 hectares of land over two sections. The front section is connected to the back section with covered corridors. The back section consists of three rooms and the left and right sides have seven rooms each. It has intricate wood carvings.

== Transportation ==
The mansion is accessible within walking distance south east of Houbi Station of Taiwan Railway.

== See also ==
- List of tourist attractions in Taiwan
