= Shouxihu Subdistrict =

Shouxihu Subdistrict 瘦西湖街道
- Subdistrict
- Location in Jiangsu
- Coordinates: 32°24′50″N 119°25′15″E
- Country: People's Republic of China
- Province: Jiangsu
- Prefecture-level city: Yangzhou
- District: Hanjiang District
- Time zone: UTC+8 (China Standard)

Shouxihu Subdistrict (Chinese: 瘦西湖街道; pinyin: Shòuxīhú Jiēdào) is a subdistrict in Hanjiang District, Yangzhou, Jiangsu, China. As of 2020, it administers the following four residential communities and two villages:

- Yuanlin Community (园林社区)
- Youyi Community (友谊社区)
- Binhu Community (滨湖社区)
- Wuting Community (五亭社区)
- Zonghe Village (综合村)
- Baocheng Village (堡城村)

== See also ==
- List of township-level divisions of Jiangsu
