= Yuanlin =

County-administered city in Changhua County, Taiwan

Yuanlin 員林市 Inrin
- County-administered city
- Yuanlin City
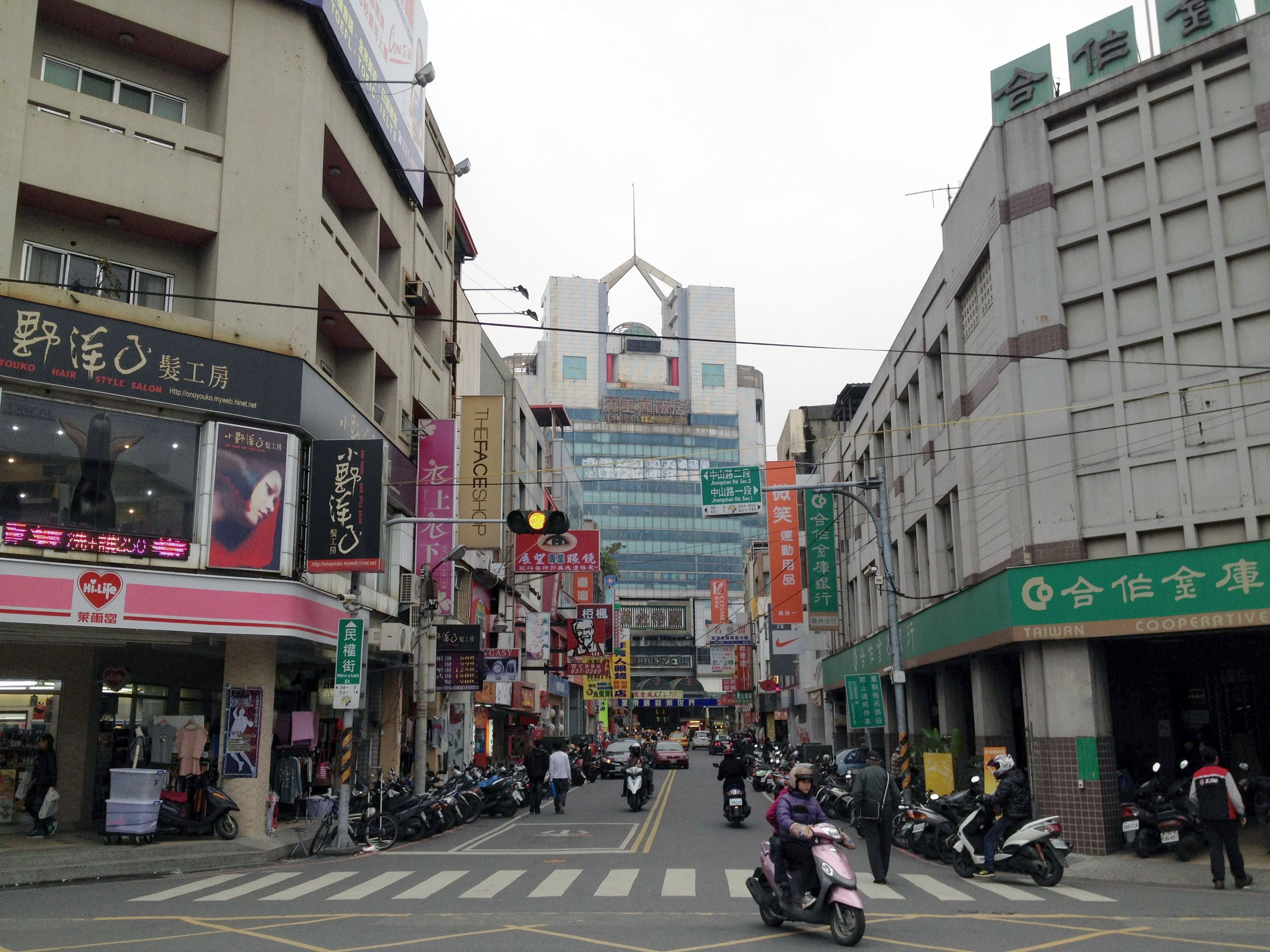

- Seal

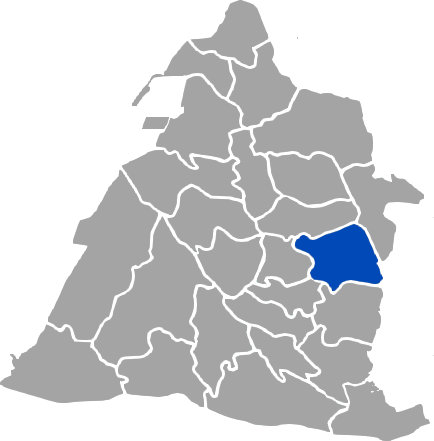
- Yuanlin within Changhua County

- Location of Yuanlin in Taiwan
- Coordinates: 23°57′40″N 120°34′25″E
- Country: Republic of China (Taiwan)
- County: Changhua
- Villages (里): List: Chushui (出水里); Dafeng (大峰里); Daming (大明里); Dapu (大埔里); Darao (大饒里); Dongbei (東北里); Donghe (東和里); Fuzun (浮圳里); Gouzao (溝皂里); Guangming (光明里); Heping (和平里); Huilai (惠來里); Hushui (湖水里); Liming (黎明里); Lincuo (林厝里); Lunya (崙雅里); Minsheng (民生里); Nandong (南東里); Nanping (南平里); Nanxing (南興里); Ren'ai (仁愛里); Renmei (仁美里); San'ai (三愛里); Sanduo (三多里); Sanhe (三和里); Sanqiao (三橋里); Santiao (三條里); Sanxin (三信里); Sanyi (三義里); Wannian (萬年里); Xidong (西東里); Xinsheng (新生里); Xinxing (新興里); Yuantan (源潭里); Zhenxing (振興里); Zhenxing (鎮興里); Zhongdong (中東里); Zhongshan (中山里); Zhongxiao (忠孝里); Zhongyang (中央里); Zhongzheng (中正里)

Government
  - Mayor: YOU, JHEN-SYONG (游振雄) (KMT)

Area
  - Total: 40.04 km^{2} (15.46 sq mi)
- Highest elevation: 410 m (1,350 ft)
- Lowest elevation: 20 m (66 ft)

Population (March 2023)
  - Total: 122,763
  - Density: 3,115/km^{2} (8,070/sq mi)
  - Households: 41,855
- Time zone: UTC+8 (CST)
- Postal code: 510
- Area code: 04
- Website: www.chcg.gov.tw/TSO/yuanlin/index.aspx (in Chinese)

Yuanlin City
- Traditional Chinese: 員林市
- Simplified Chinese: 员林市
Transcriptions
Standard Mandarin
- Hanyu Pinyin: Yuánlín Shì
- Bopomofo: ㄩㄢˊ ㄌㄧㄣˊ ㄕˋ
- Gwoyeu Romatzyh: Yuanlin Shyh
- Wade–Giles: Yüan²-lin² Shih⁴
- Tongyong Pinyin: Yuánlín Shìh
- MPS2: Yuánlín Shr̀
- IPA: [ɥɛ̌n.lǐn ʂɻ̩̂]
Hakka
- Pha̍k-fa-sṳ: Yèn-lìm-sṳ
Southern Min
- Hokkien POJ: Oân-lîm-chhī
- Tâi-lô: Uân-lîm-tshī

Yuanlin (Hokkien POJ: Oân-lîm) is a county-administered city in eastern Changhua County, Taiwan. It is the second largest settlement in the county, after the county seat of Changhua City.

== History ==
The land around Yuanlin was cleared of trees and bushes, and fitted for cultivation since the Yongzheng era of the Qing dynasty (1723–1735). It was well developed about the 16th year of the Qianlong era. At first, people cut down the surrounding forests to build their houses. Gradually, only the round woodland was left, and the town was named 圓林仔 (Pe̍h-ōe-jī: Oân-nâ-á), meaning "the round woodland." Later the characters were changed to 員林 (Yuanlin). Yuanlin produces different kinds of fruits, and succade (fruit cooked in sugar syrup and encrusted with a sugar crystals) is one of its specialties.

=== Republic of China ===
After the handover of Taiwan from Japan to the Republic of China in 1945, Yuanlin was made the capital of the newly established Taichung County. In 1950, Changhua and Nantou were separated from the county to form new counties. Being in Changhua County, Yuanlin ceased becoming the capital of Taichung County, and the new capital of Taichung County was given to Fengyuan Township. On 8 August 2015, Yuanlin was upgraded from an urban township into a county-administered city after the qualifying population level for city status was revised downwards from 125,000 to 100,000 people.

== Geography ==
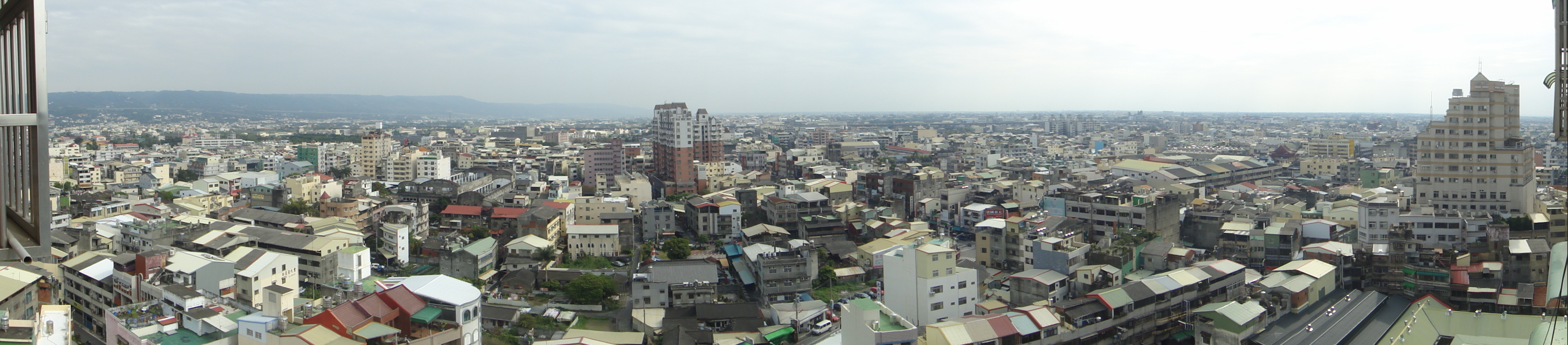
Yuanlin, looking south towards Shetou

Yuanlin is located on the eastern border of Changhua County, in central Taiwan. The city is bordered to the north by Dacun, to the east by Fenyuan and Nantou City (the only neighboring settlement outside Changhua County), to the south by Shetou, and to the west by Yongjing and Puxin.

== Demographics ==
With a population of 122,763 as of March 2023, Yuanlin was the most populated township in Taiwan until it was upgraded into a county-administered city, and has a higher population than 10 of the 17 county-administered cities. The division between male and female residents is almost equal, with 60,510 male and 62,253 female registered inhabitants in 41,855 households. At the beginning of the Republic of China era on Taiwan, the first census in December 1946 showed a population of 37,999, with steady annual increases from then on. The number of inhabitants passed the 50,000 mark in 1953, and first exceeded 100,000 in 1979. Since 1995 the population has fluctuated only slightly, and remained between 124,000 and 128,000.

== Administrative divisions ==
Lunya, Zhenxing, Lincuo, Chushui, Hushui, Dafeng, Zengxing, Fuzun, Xitung, Nantung, Zhongtung, Tungbei, Tunghe, Minsheng, Liming, Huilai, Zhongyang, Gouzao, Darao, Daming, Wannian, Zhongzheng, Renmei, Xinxing, Heping, Guangming, Zhongshan, Santiao, Zhongxiao, Renai, Sanhe, Sanqiao, Sanai, Sanxin, Sanduo, Sanyi, Xinsheng, Nanping, Nanxing, Yuantan and Dapu Village.

== Politics ==
In the early 2010s two mayors of the town were convicted in separate corruption cases. July 2010 saw former mayor Tu Quanchong sentenced to 16 years in prison for soliciting NT$3.5 million in kickbacks from a major construction project dating back to his time in office. In April 2011 the then serving mayor, Wu Zongxian, was impeached on corruption charges similarly related to kickbacks from construction projects. Wu was subsequently sentenced to 14 years in prison, having been found guilty of exacting bribes in excess of NT$16 million from 81 different projects since 2005. Officials from the Control Yuan said the scope of Wu's activities was "unprecedented" and that "virtually no construction projects in the town were untainted by corruption".

== Education ==
- Chung Chou University of Science and Technology

== Tourist attractions ==
- Yuanlin Performance Hall

== Transportation ==
=== Rail ===
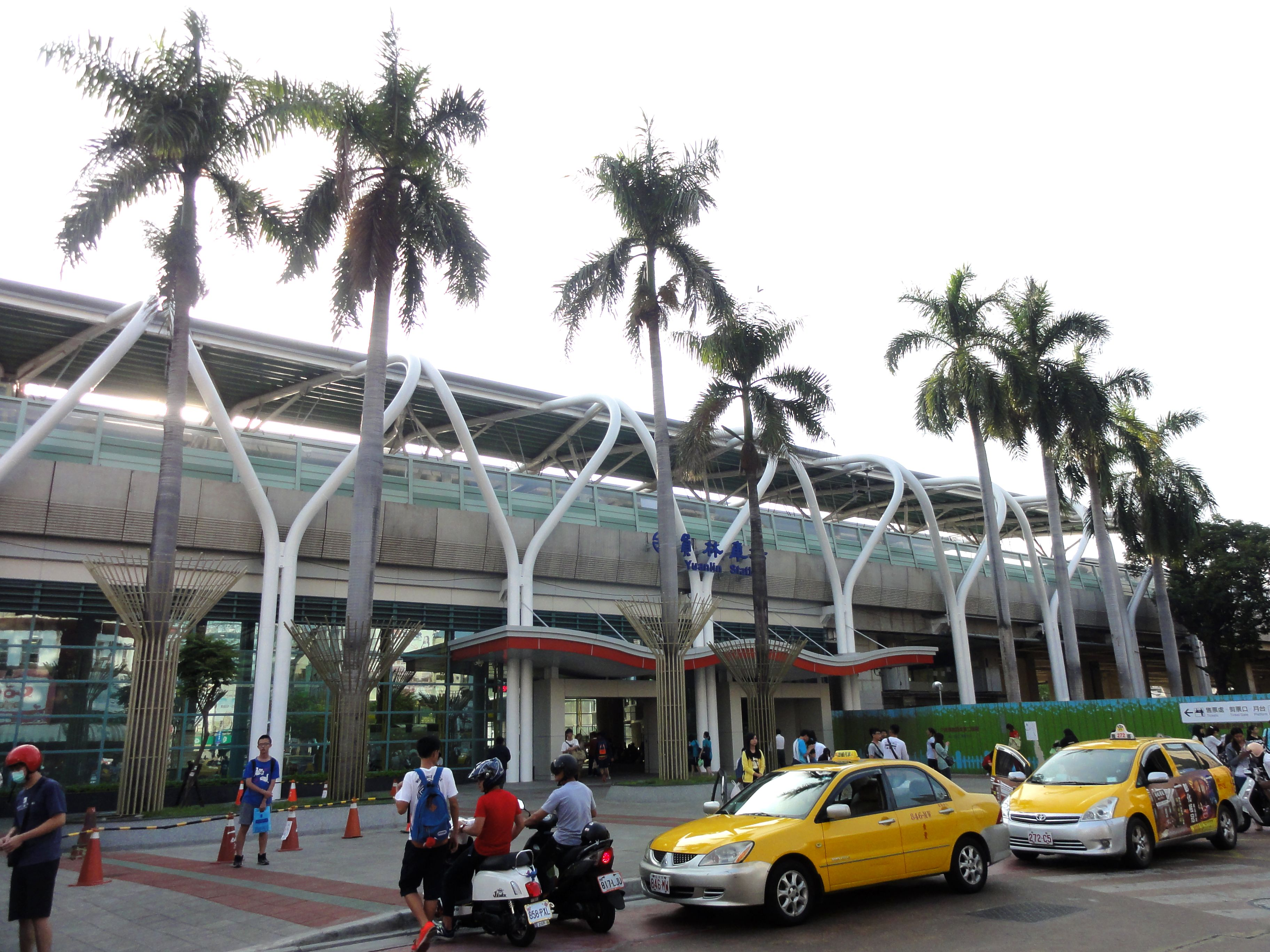
Yuanlin Station

Yuanlin has a station on the Taiwan Railway's Western Line. A project is underway to redevelop the station in combination with converting the current at-grade line to an elevated line through the city, a plan designed to improve road traffic flow and promote investment. The elevation of the track will eliminate three level crossings and five underpasses, and the area currently comprising the station will be converted into a mixed-use development with commercial space, parking and green space. This redevelopment was scheduled to be completed in 2013 and has a budget of NT$4 billion.

=== Road ===
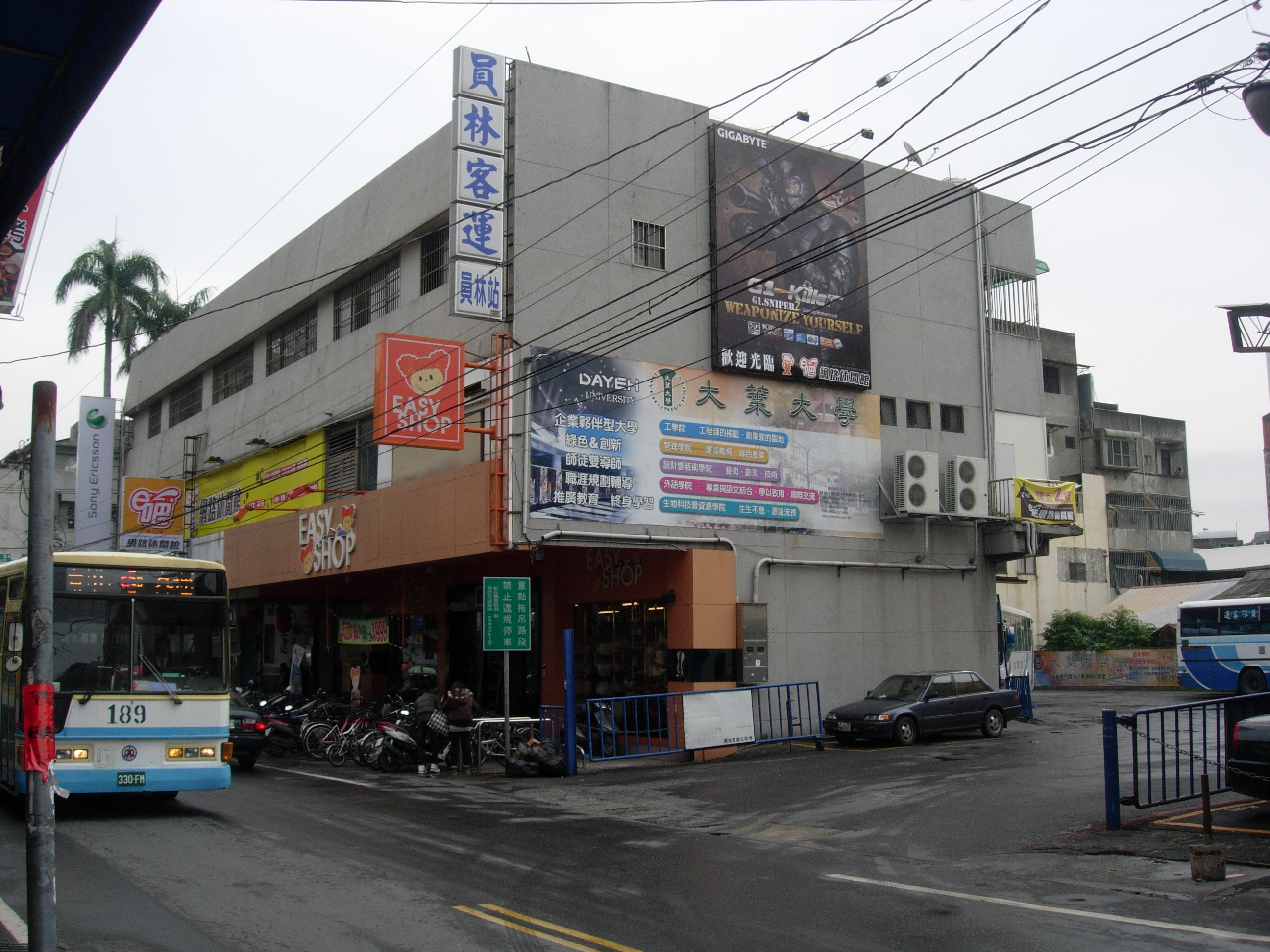
Yuanlin Bus Station

Bus stations in the city are Yuanlin Bus Station of Yuanlin Bus and Yuanlin Transfer Station. To travel outside Yuanlin by road, the Provincial Highway 76, an east-west elevated route, runs through the city and is the most efficient way to reach either of Taiwan's major north-south freeways, the National 1 and the National 3.

== Notable natives ==
- Chan Ya-wen, singer, lyricist, composer
- Steve Chan, Vice Chairperson of Kuomintang (2016–2017)
- Wong Chin-chu, Magistrate of Changhua County (2001–2005)
- Kuo Lin-yung, retired politician, lawyer
