= Dacun railway station =

Railway station in Dacun, Taiwan

Dacun Station 大村車站
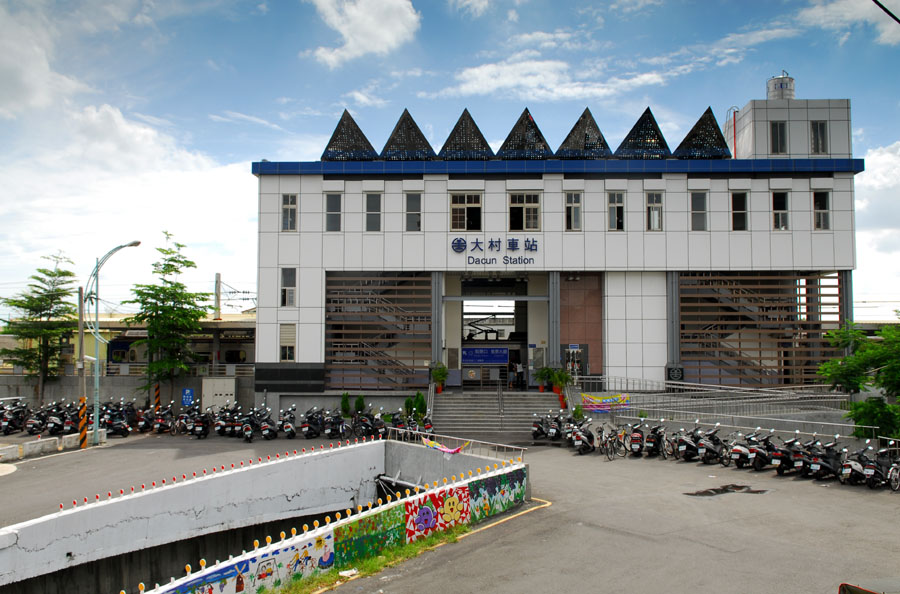

General information
- Location: Dacun, Changhua County, Taiwan
- Coordinates: 23°59′23.8″N 120°33′37.9″E
- System: Train station
- Owner: Taiwan Railway
- Operator: Taiwan Railway
- Line: Western Trunk line
- Train operators: Taiwan Railway

History
- Opened: 4 April 2006

Passengers
- 1,715 daily (2024)

Services
Preceding station	Taiwan Railway	Following station
Huatan towards Keelung	Western Trunk line	Yuanlin towards Kaohsiung
Location

Dacun (Chinese: 大村車站; pinyin: Dàcūn Chēzhàn) is a railway station of Taiwan Railway West Coast line located in Dacun Township, Changhua County, Taiwan.

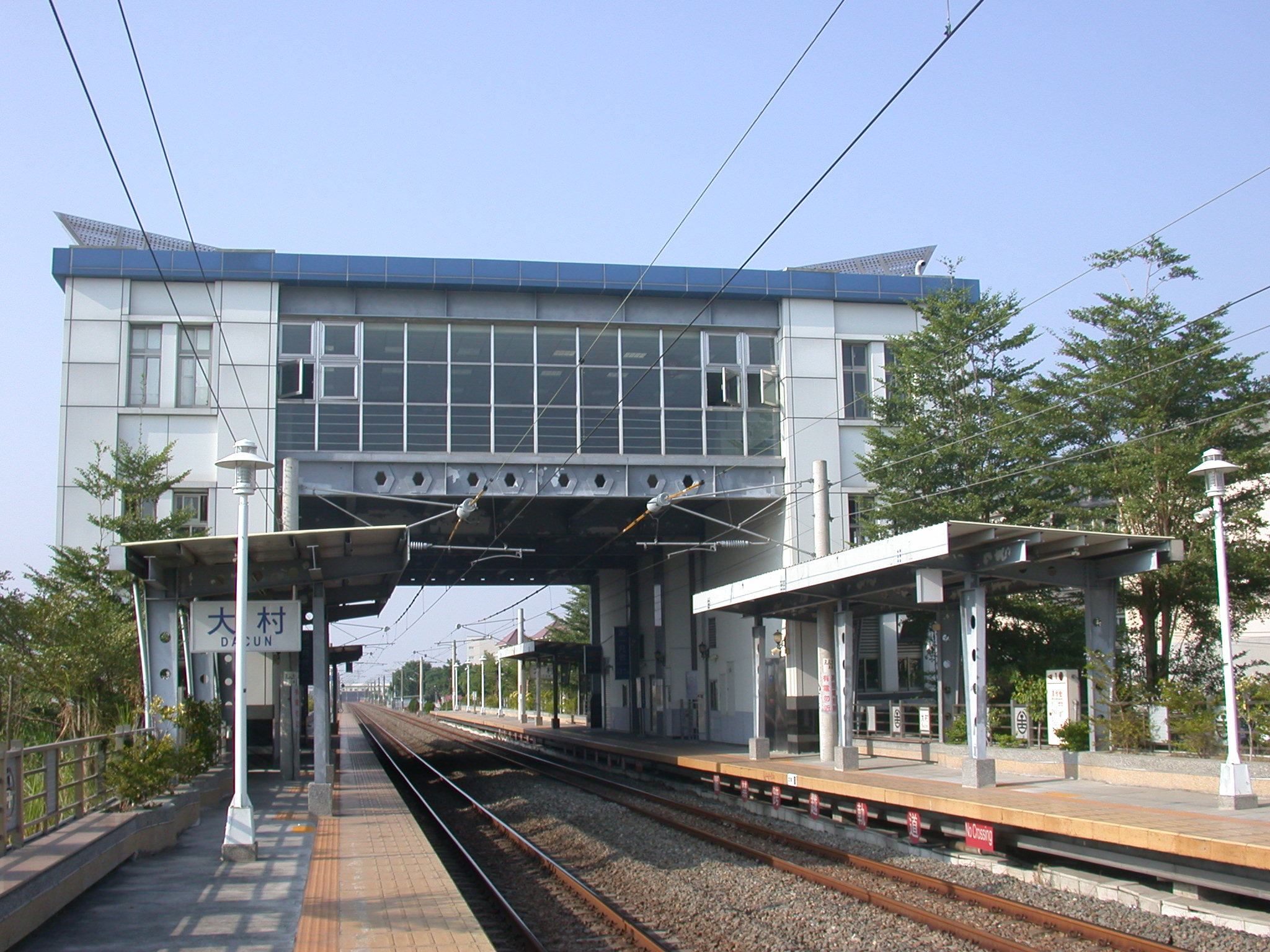
Dacun station platform

== History ==
The station was opened on 4 April 2006.

== See also ==
- List of railway stations in Taiwan
