= Luo Jye =

Taiwanese businessman (1925–2019)

- Born: 1925; Inrin District, Taichū Prefecture, Japanese Taiwan
- Died: 15 March 2019 (aged 93–94)
- Occupation: Tire manufacturer
- Known for: Founder, Cheng Shin Rubber
- Children: 4, including Lo Tsai-Jen

Luo Jye (Chinese: 羅結; pinyin: Luó Jié; 1925 – 15 March 2019) was a Taiwanese billionaire, founder of Cheng Shin Rubber, the world's ninth largest tire manufacturer. At the time of his death, he was the sixth richest person in Taiwan.

== Early life ==
Luo Jye was born in 1925.

== Career ==
Luo founded Cheng Shin Rubber in 1967. In January 2015, he passed control of Cheng Shin to his son, Lo Tsai-jen.

According to Forbes, Luo had a net worth of US$4.2 billion, as of January 2015.

== Personal life ==
Luo had four children and lived in Dacun, Changhua, Taiwan.

Luo died on 15 March 2019, at the age of 94.
