= Huatan railway station =

Railway station in Changhua County, Taiwan

Huatan Station 花壇車站
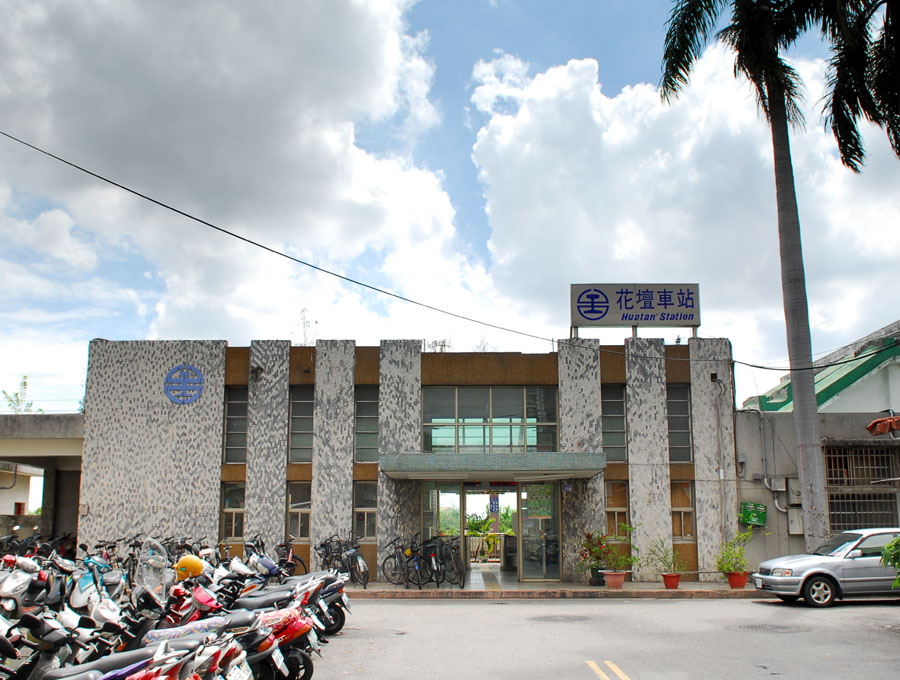

General information
- Location: Huatan, Changhua County, Taiwan
- Coordinates: 24°01′29.8″N 120°32′14.6″E
- System: Train station
- Owner: Taiwan Railway
- Operator: Taiwan Railway
- Line: Western Trunk line
- Train operators: Taiwan Railway

History
- Opened: 26 March 1905

Passengers
- 2,491 daily (2024)

Services
Preceding station	Taiwan Railway	Following station
Changhua towards Keelung	Western Trunk line	Dacun towards Kaohsiung
Location

Huatan (Chinese: 花壇車站; pinyin: Huātán Chēzhàn) is a railway station on Taiwan Railway West Coast line located in Huatan Township, Changhua County, Taiwan.

== History ==
The station was opened on 26 March 1905.

== See also ==
- List of railway stations in Taiwan
