= Hungkuang University =

University in Shalu, Taichung, Taiwan

- 弘光科技大學
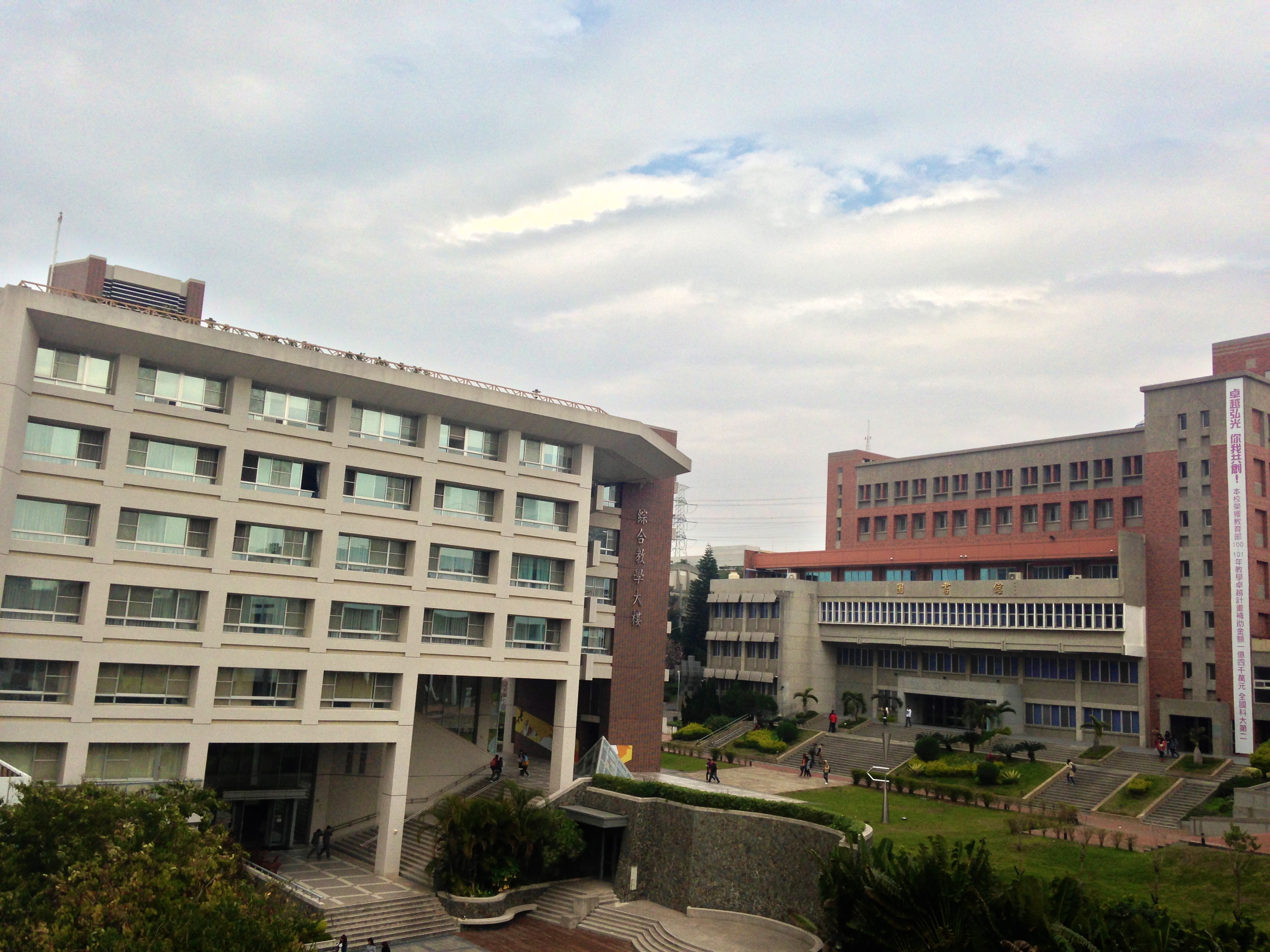
- Type: Private
- Established: July 7, 1967 (as Hungkuang Junior College of Nursing)
- Location: Taichung, Taiwan; 24.2180°N 120.5822°E
- Website: Official website

Hungkuang University
- Traditional Chinese: 弘光科技大學
Transcriptions
Standard Mandarin
- Hanyu Pinyin: Hóngguāng Kējì Dàxué
Southern Min
- Hokkien POJ: Hông-kong Kho-ki Tāi-ha̍k

Hungkuang University (HKU) is a private university located in Shalu District, Taichung, Taiwan.

HKU offers undergraduate and graduate programs in a variety of fields, including business, engineering, humanities, science, and social sciences. Some of its most popular programs include nursing, electrical engineering, and business management.

The university also offers a number of international programs, including exchange programs with partner universities around the world.

== History ==
HKU was initially established as Hungkuang Junior College of Nursing on 7 July 1967. The college became Hungkuang Institute of Technology in 1997 and a university in February 2003 as Hungkuang University.

== Faculties ==
College of Medicine and Nursing

- Department of Nursing (Bachelor Program and Masters Program)
- Department of Nursing (5-year junior college program)
- Department of Nutrition, Master Program of Biomedical Nutrition
- Department of Physical Therapy
- Department of Biotechnology

College of Humanities and Social Sciences

- Department of Applied English
- Department of Cultural and Creative Industries
- Department of Senior Citizen Welfare and Business
- Department of Sports and Leisure
- Physical Education Center
- Arts Center

College of Human Ecology

- Department of Food Science and Technology
- Department of Child Care and Education
- Research Center for Industrial Applied Biotechnology (RCIAB)
- Department of Hair Styling and Design
- Testing And Analysis Center for Food And Cosmetics
- Department of Applied Cosmetology, Master Program of Cosmetic science

College of Management

- Department of Hospitality Management
- Department of Health Business Administration
- Department of Computer Science and Information Management

College of Engineering

- Department of Computer Science and Information Engineering
- Department of Biomedical Engineering
- Department of Safety, Health and Environmental Engineering
- Institute of Occupational Safety and Hazard Prevention
- Department of Environmental Engineering

College of General Education

- Service Learning Center
- Humanity Education and Development Center

== Transportation ==
The university is accessible southeast from Shalu Station of Taiwan Railway.

== See also ==
- List of universities in Taiwan
