= Houbi District =

District in Tainan, Taiwan

Coordinates: 23.362744°N 120.348648°E

Houbi 後壁區
- District
- Houbi District
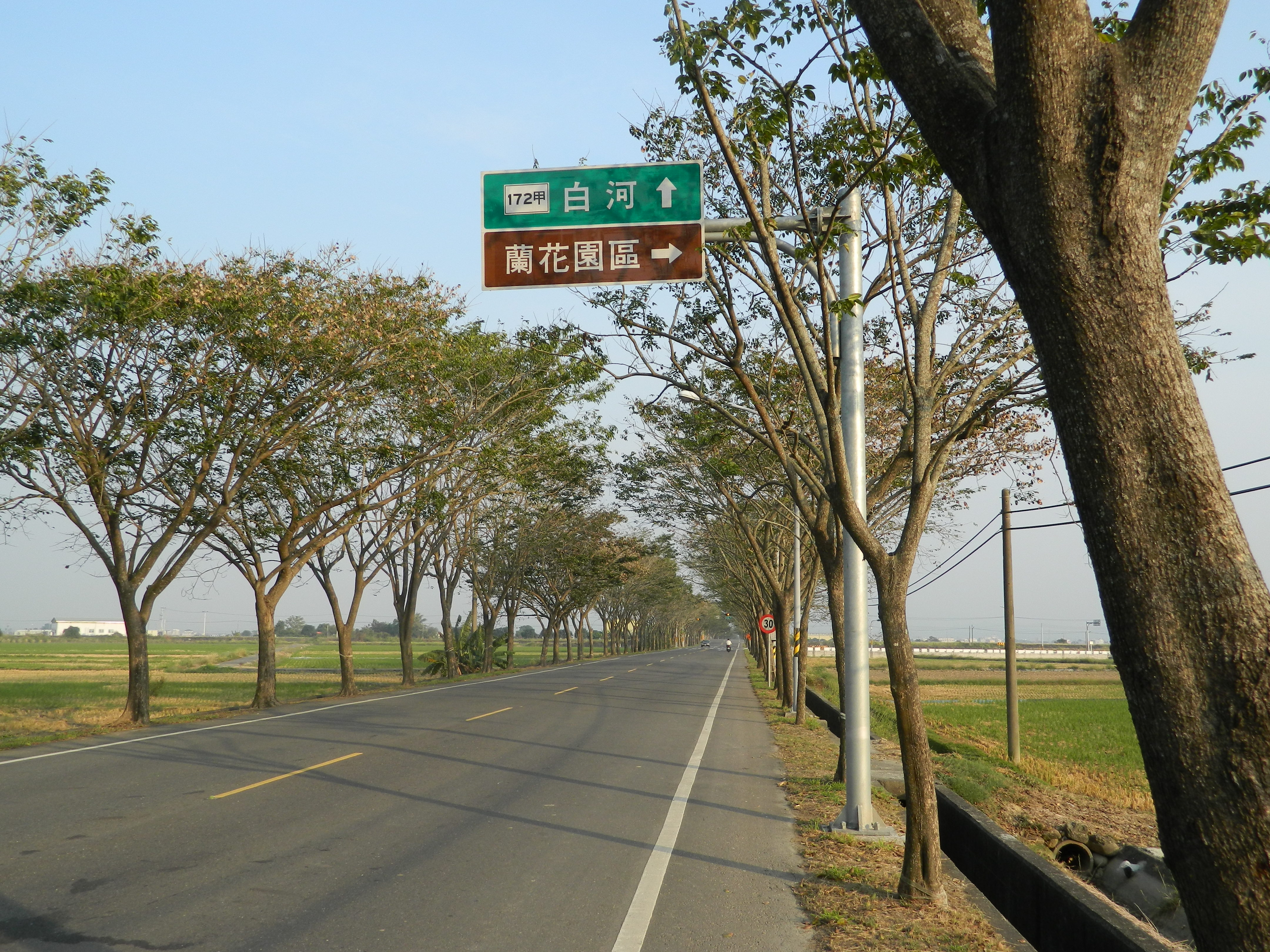

- Houbi District in Tainan City
- Location: Tainan, Taiwan

Area
  - Total: 72 km^{2} (28 sq mi)

Population (May 2022)
  - Total: 22,108
  - Density: 310/km^{2} (800/sq mi)
- Website: web.tainan.gov.tw/houbi_en/

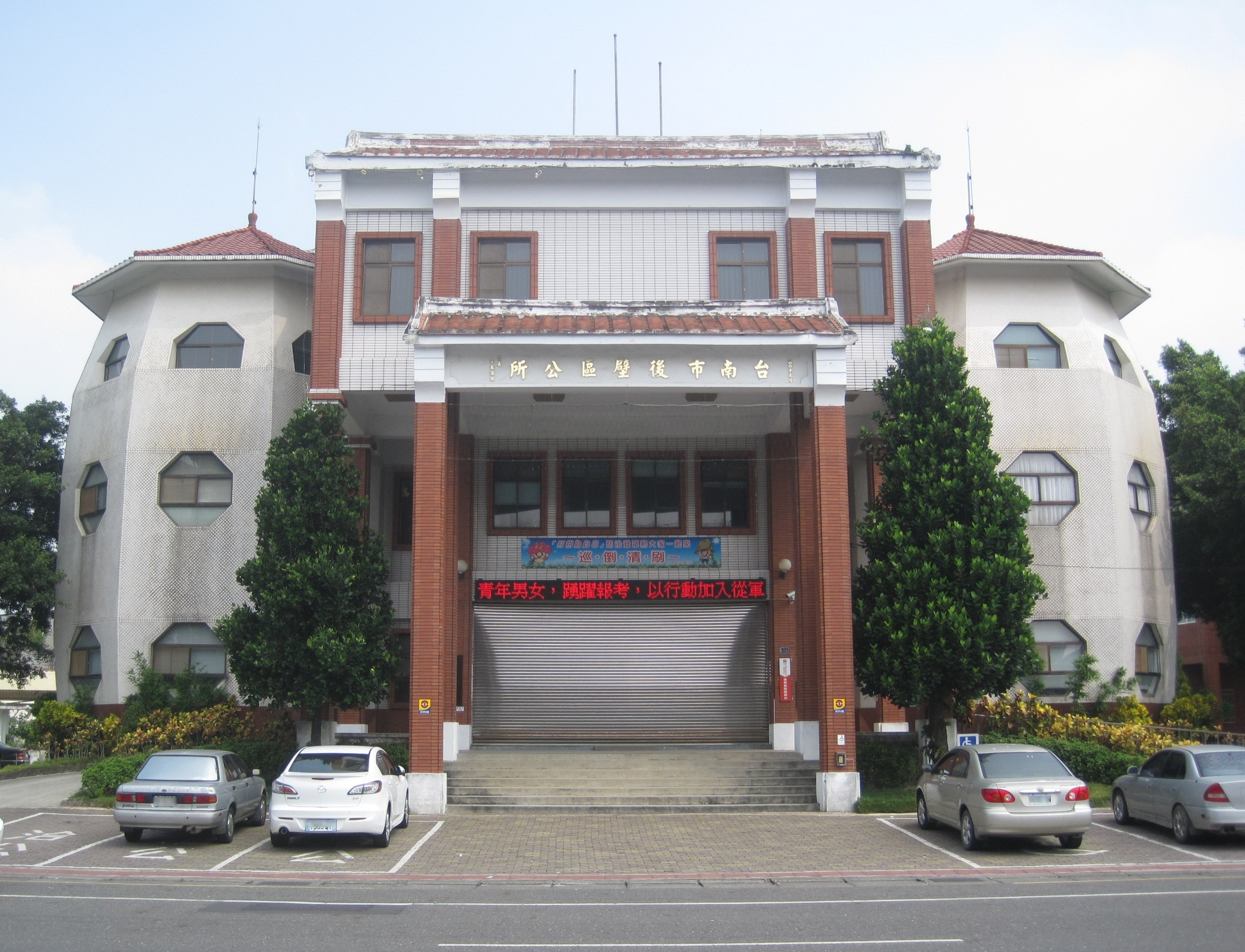
Houbi District office

Houbi District (Chinese: 後壁區; pinyin: Hòubì Qū; Wade–Giles: Hou^{4}-pi^{4} Ch'ü^{1}; Pe̍h-ōe-jī: Āu-piah-khu) is a rural district of about 22,108 residents in Tainan, Taiwan.

== History ==
After the handover of Taiwan from Japan to the Republic of China in 1945, Houbi was organized as a rural township of Tainan County. On 25 December 2010, Tainan County was merged with Tainan City and Houbi was upgraded to a district of the city.

== Administrative divisions ==
Dingan, Dingzhang, Fuan, Houba, Houbi, Houbu, Jiadong, Jiamin, Jiatian, Jingli, Jingliao, Kanding, Molin, Pingan, Shian, Tugou, Wushu, Xinjia, Xintung, Zhangan and Zhuxin Village.

== Tourist attractions ==
- Houbi Huang Family Mansion
- Jingliao Huang Family Mansion
- Saint Cross Church
- Lower Jiadong Taian Temple
- Putuo Buddhist Temple
- Ruan Family Mansion
- Wushulin Sugar Plant

== Transportation ==
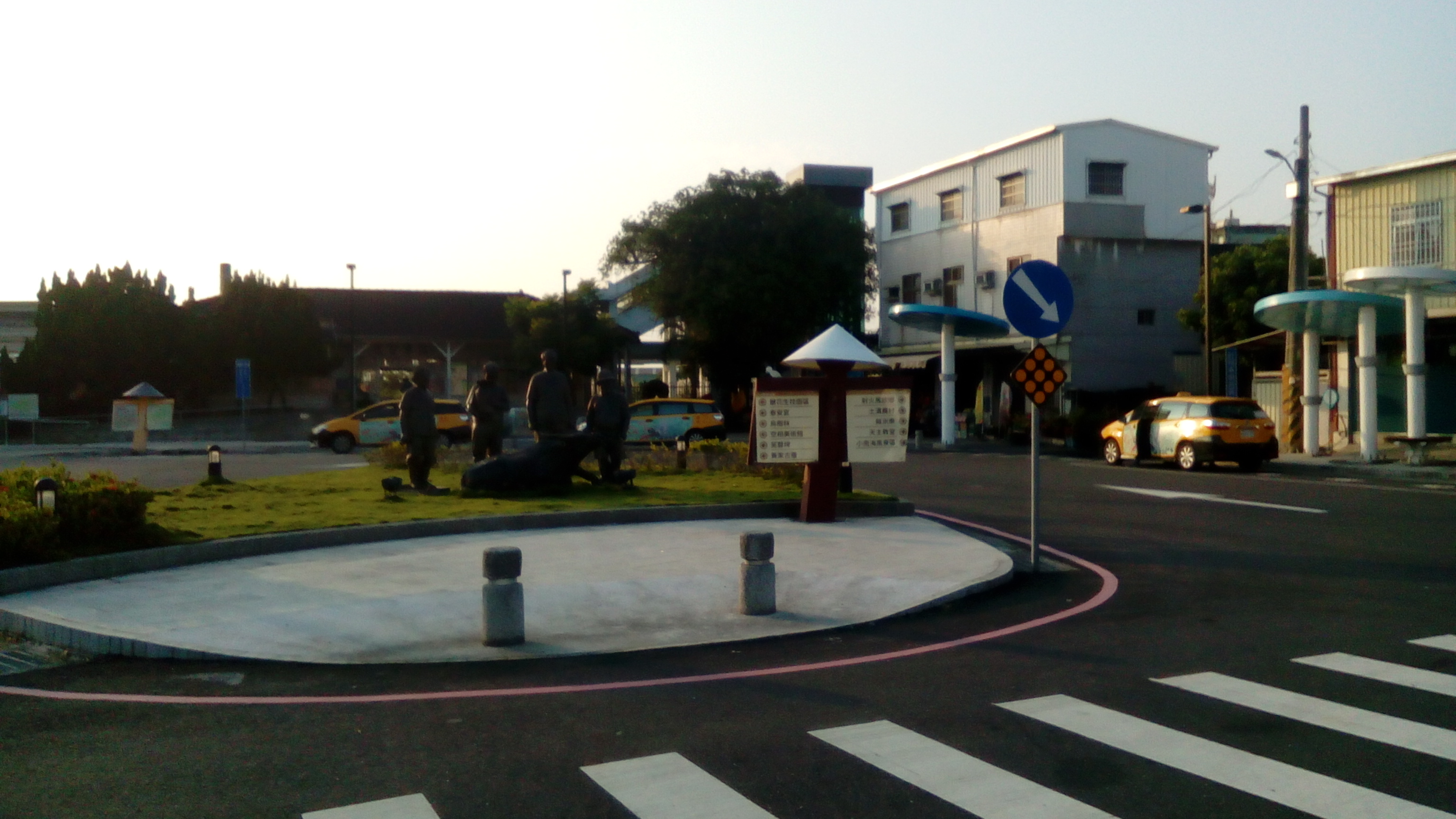
Houbi Station

- TR Houbi Station

== Notable natives ==
- Hsing Hui, actress
