= Shalu railway station =

Railway station in Taichung, Taiwan

Shalu 沙鹿
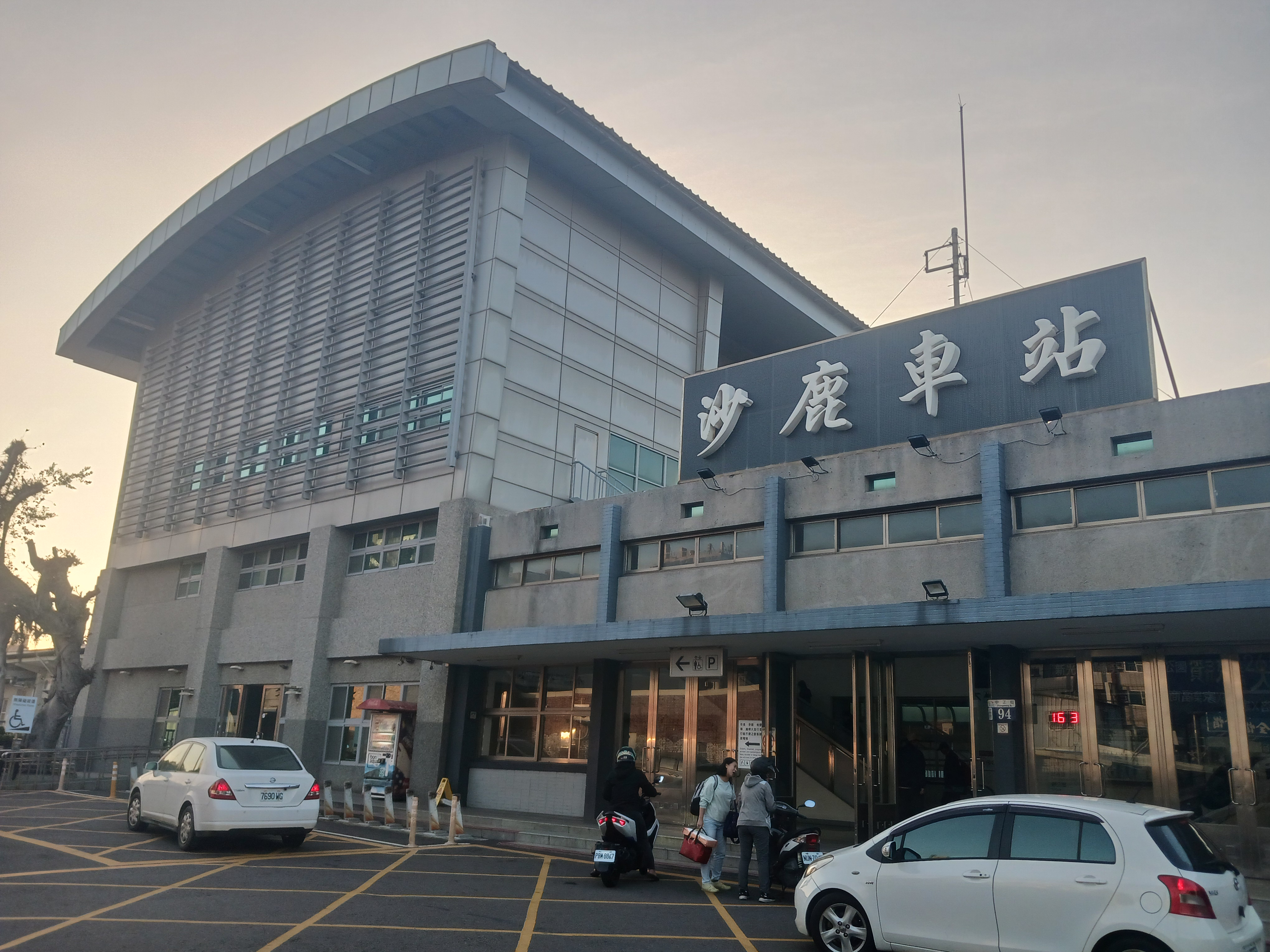

General information
- Location: Shalu, Taichung, Taiwan
- Coordinates: 24°14′13.2″N 120°33′27.3″E
- Owner: Taiwan Railway Corporation
- Operator: Taiwan Railway Corporation
- Line: Western Trunk line
- Distance: 68.5 km from Zhunan
- Train operators: Taiwan Railway Corporation

History
- Opened: 25 December 1920

Passengers
- 5,620 daily (2024)
Location

Shalu station (Chinese: 沙鹿車站; pinyin: Shālù Chēzhàn; Pe̍h-ōe-jī: Soa-la̍k Chhia-chām) is a railway station on the Western Trunk line of Taiwan Railway. It was built in May 1919 and is located in Shalu District, Taichung, Taiwan.

== Structure ==
The station was first built as a wooden structure due to the extreme slopes.

== Service ==
Services began in December 1920 for passengers and cargo.

== Around the station ==
- Hungkuang University
- Mitsui Outlet Park Taichung
- Providence University

== See also ==
- List of railway stations in Taiwan

Preceding station	Taiwan Railway	Following station
Qingshui towards Keelung	Western Trunk line	Longjing towards Pingtung
