= Yuanlin Performance Hall =

Theater in Yuanlin, Changhua County, Taiwan

- 員林演藝廳
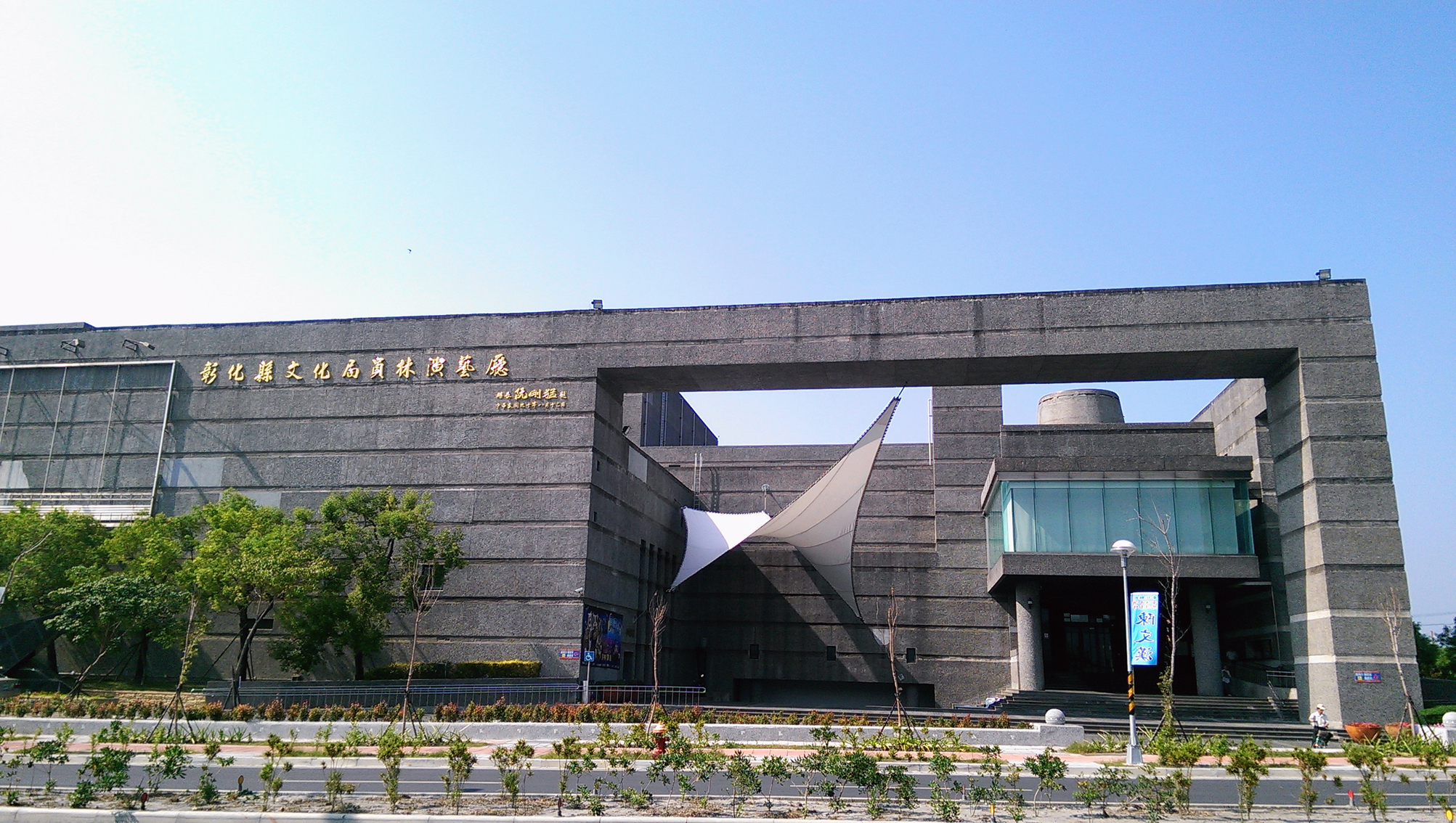
- Interactive map of Yuanlin Performance Hall
- Location: Yuanlin, Changhua County, Taiwan
- Coordinates: 23°56′57.6″N 120°34′43.6″E
- Type: theatre
- Public transit: Yuanlin Station

Construction
- Groundbreaking: 15 December 1997
- Opened: 12 August 2001
- Architects: Shao Dong Gang Architect and Associates

Website
- Official website (in Chinese)

The Yuanlin Performance Hall (traditional Chinese: 員林演藝廳; simplified Chinese: 员林演艺厅; pinyin: Yuánlín Yǎnyì Tīng) is a performance center in Yuanlin City, Changhua County, Taiwan. It is the largest cultural building in the county.

== History ==
The construction of the hall started on 15 December 1997 and was opened on 12 August 2001.

== Architecture ==
The hall consists of performance hall, small theater, exhibition room, library etc. It was designed by Shao Dong Gang Architect and Associates. In 2012, the hall was equipped with QSC Audio Products.

== Transportation ==
The center is accessible within walking distance southeast of Yuanlin Station of Taiwan Railway.

== See also ==
- List of tourist attractions in Taiwan
