= Linnei =

Rural township in Yunlin, Taiwan

Coordinates: 23.75911°N 120.618355°E

Linnei Township 林內鄉
- Rural township
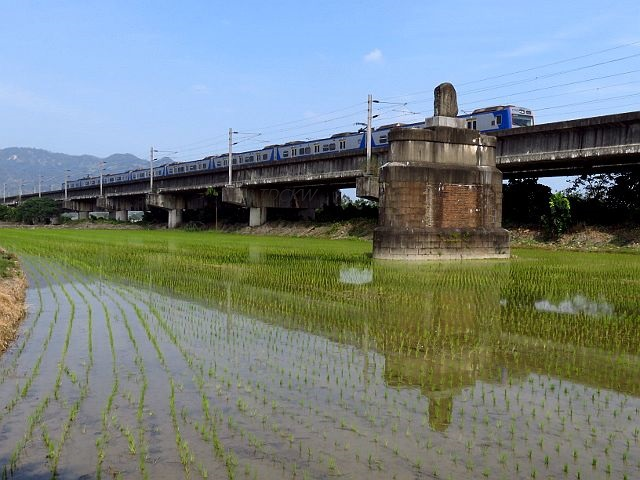
- Rail bridge crossing the Zhuoshui River in Linnei Township

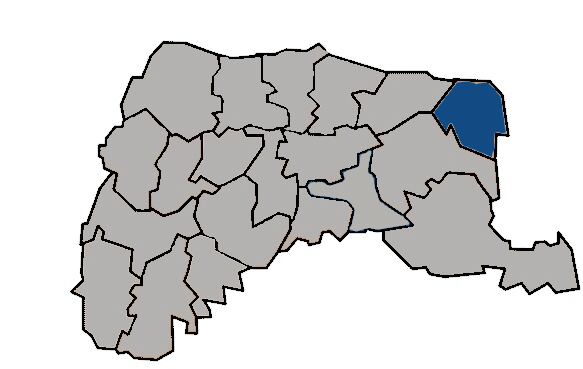
- Linnei Township in Yunlin County
- Location: Yunlin County, Taiwan

Area
  - Total: 38 km^{2} (15 sq mi)

Population (February 2023)
  - Total: 16,856
  - Density: 440/km^{2} (1,100/sq mi)

Linnei Township (traditional Chinese: 林內鄉; simplified Chinese: 林内乡; pinyin: Línnèi Xiāng) is a rural township in Yunlin County, Taiwan. It is the second smallest township in Yunlin County after Baozhong Township.

== History ==
During the Japanese era, Toroku Town (斗六街) covered modern-day Douliu and Linnei and was under Toroku District of Tainan Prefecture.

== Geography ==
It has a population total of 16,856 and an area of 37.6035 km^{2}.

== Administrative divisions ==
Linnan, Linzhong, Linbei, Pingding, Linmao, Jiuqiong, Huben, Wutu, Wuma and Zhongxing Village.

== Tourist attractions ==
- Baima Temple
- Farming and Irrigation Artifacts Museum
- Linnei Park
- Mount Xiao Huang
- Pingding Ruins
- Tian Shen Temple
- Wutu Power Plant

== Transportation ==
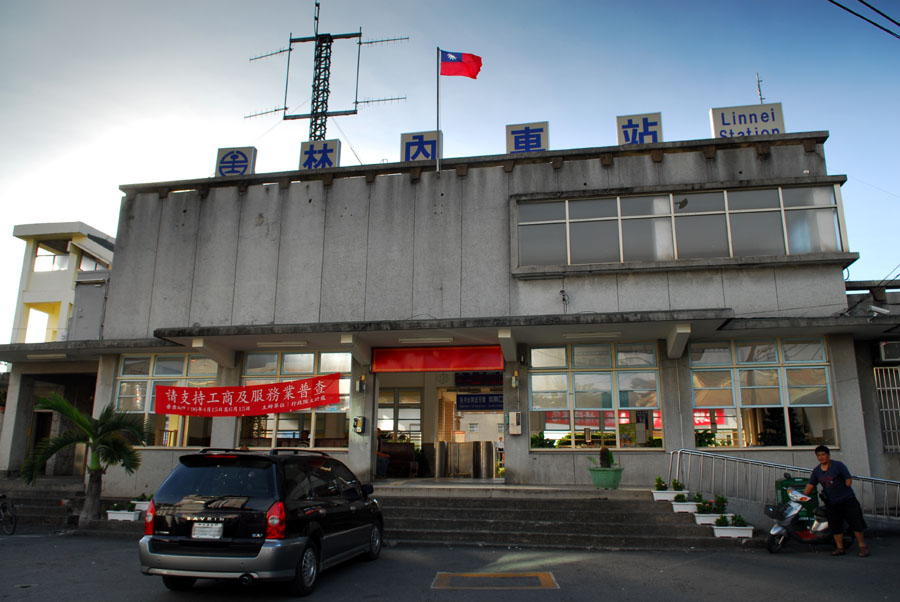
Linnei Station

The township is accessible by Linnei Station of Taiwan Railway.
