= Huatan =

Rural township in Changhua County, Taiwan

Huatan Township 花壇鄉
- Rural township
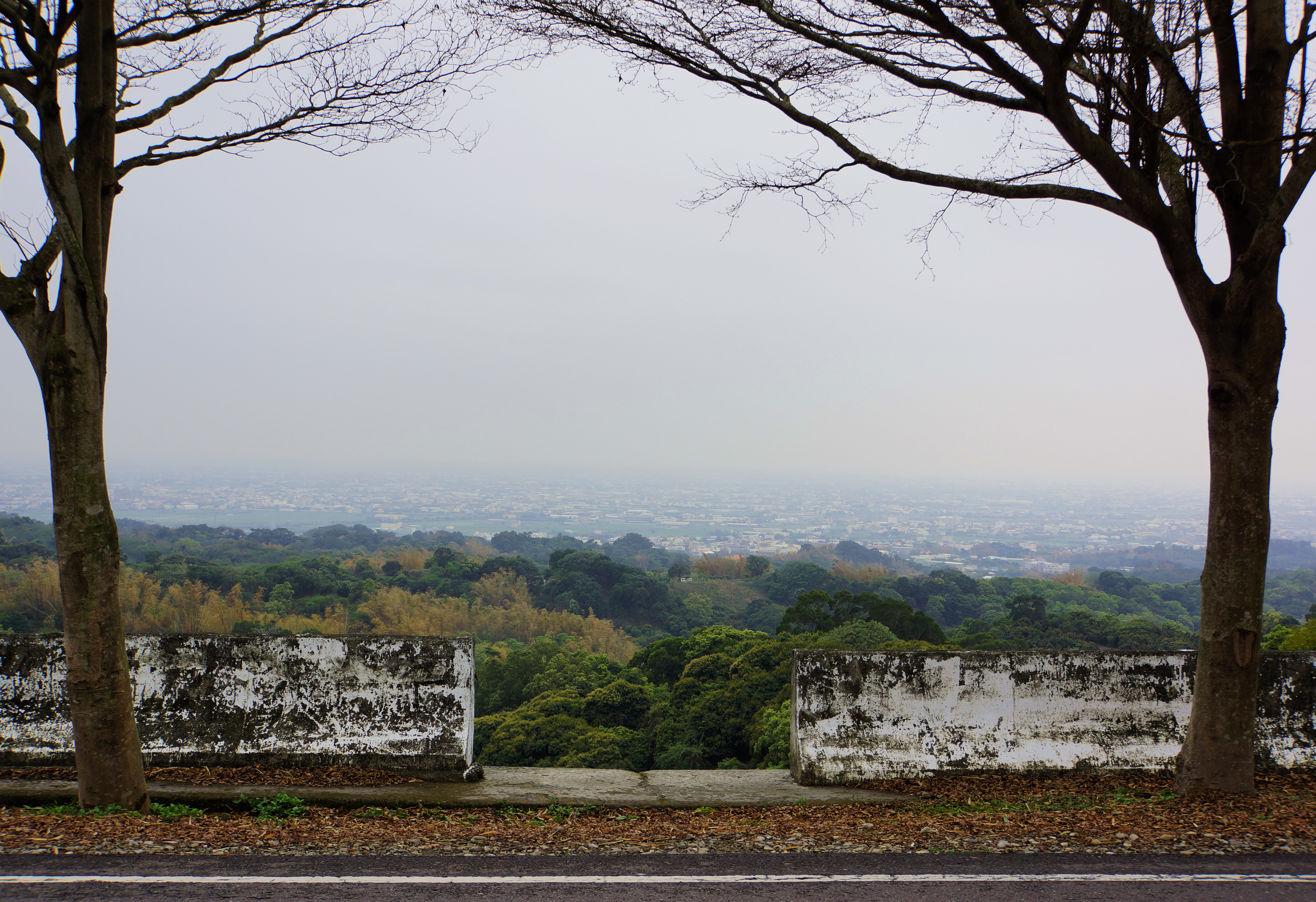

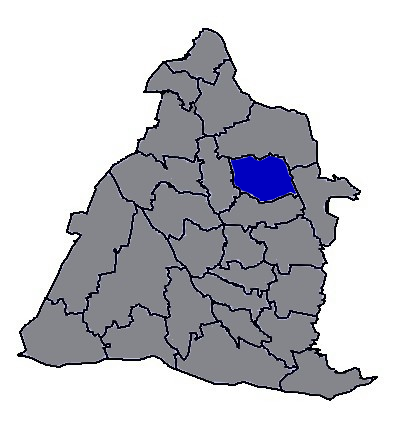
- Huatan Township in Changhua County
- Coordinates: 24°01′53.9″N 120°33′28.5″E
- Country: Taiwan
- County: Changhua County

Area
  - Total: 36 km^{2} (14 sq mi)

Population (March 2023)
  - Total: 44,245
  - Density: 1,200/km^{2} (3,200/sq mi)

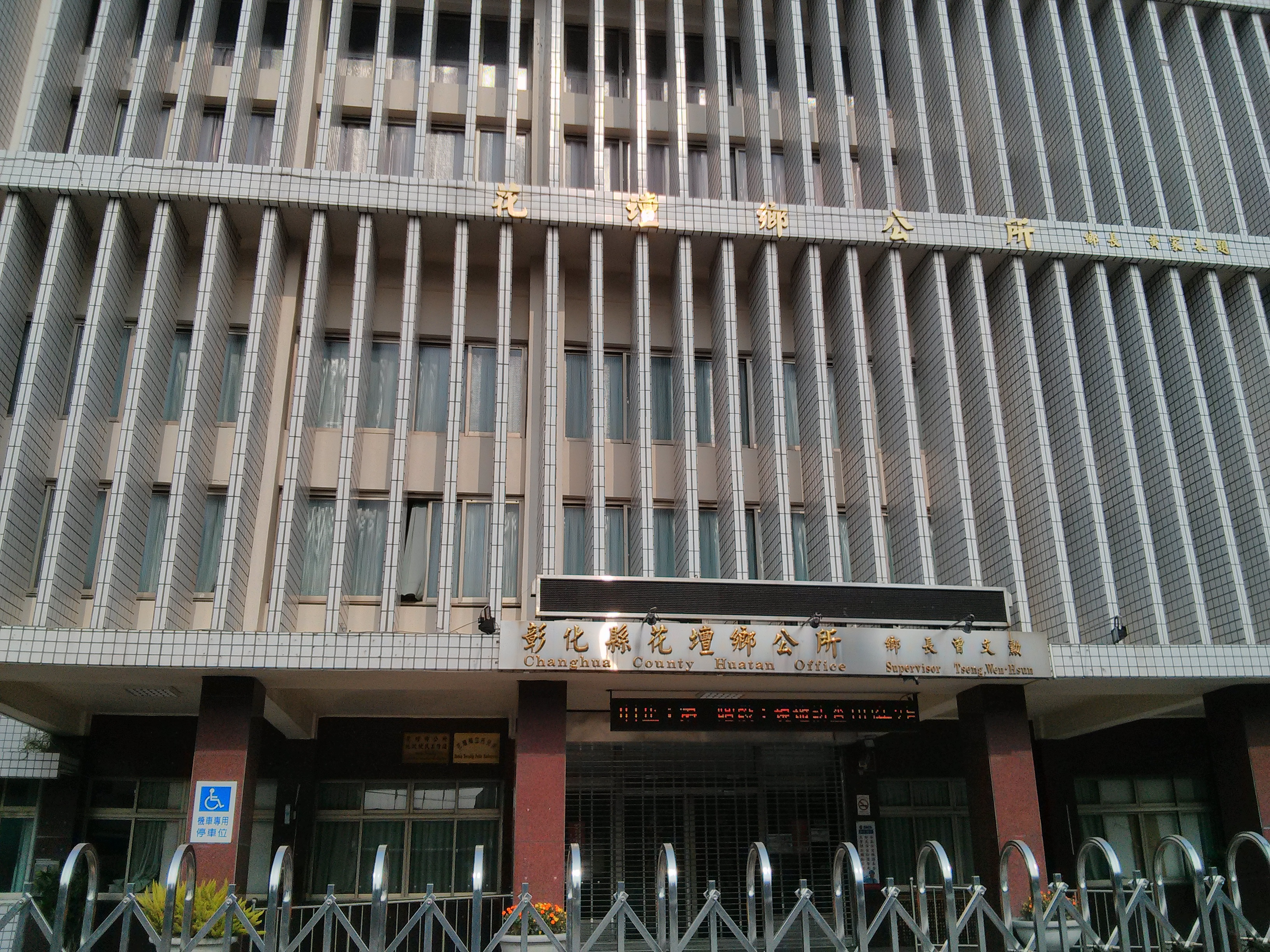
Huatan Township Office

Huatan Township (Chinese: 花壇鄉; pinyin: Huātán Xiāng) is a rural township in Changhua County, Taiwan.

== History ==
Formerly called Katangkha (Chinese: 茄苳跤; Pe̍h-ōe-jī: Ka-tang-kha).

== Geography ==
Huatan encompasses 36.35 km^{2} (14.03 sq mi) and a population of 44,245, including 22,652 males and 21,593 females as of March 2023.

== Administrative divisions ==
The township comprises 18 villages, which are Baisha, Beikou, Huatan, Jindun, Liucuo, Lunya, Nankou, Qiaotou, Sanchun, Wantung, Wanya, Wende, Yanzhu, Yongchun, Zhangchun, Zhangsha, Zhongkou and Zhongzhuang Village.

== Tourist attractions ==
- Hushan Temple

== Transportation ==
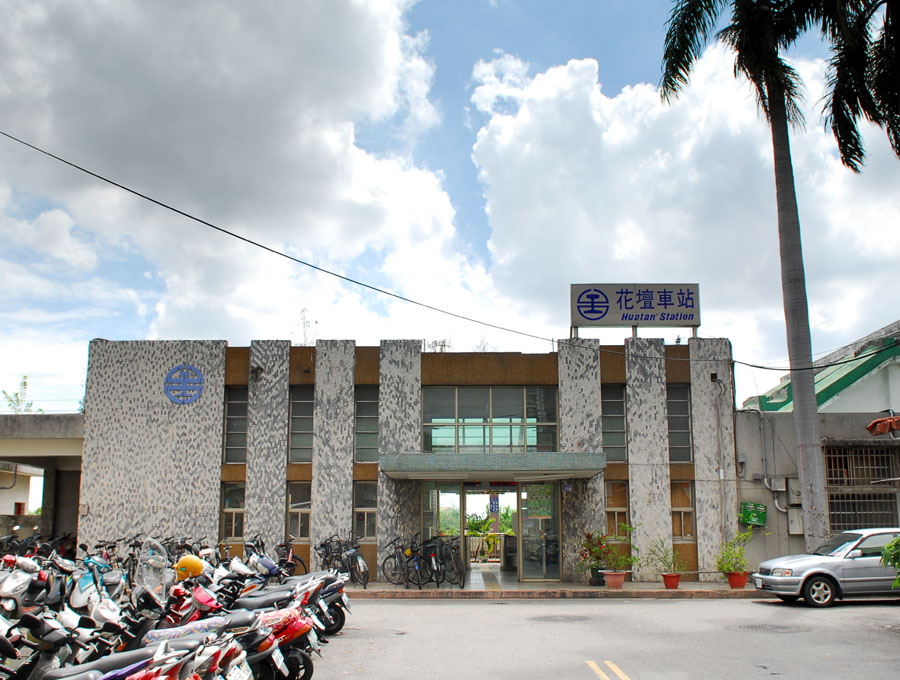
Huatan Station

- Taiwan Railway Huatan Station
