= Dacun =

Rural township in Changhua County, Taiwan

Dacun 大村
- Rural township
- Dacun Township · 大村鄉

Chinese transcription(s)
  - Traditional: 大村鄉
  - Pinyin: Dàcūn Xiāng
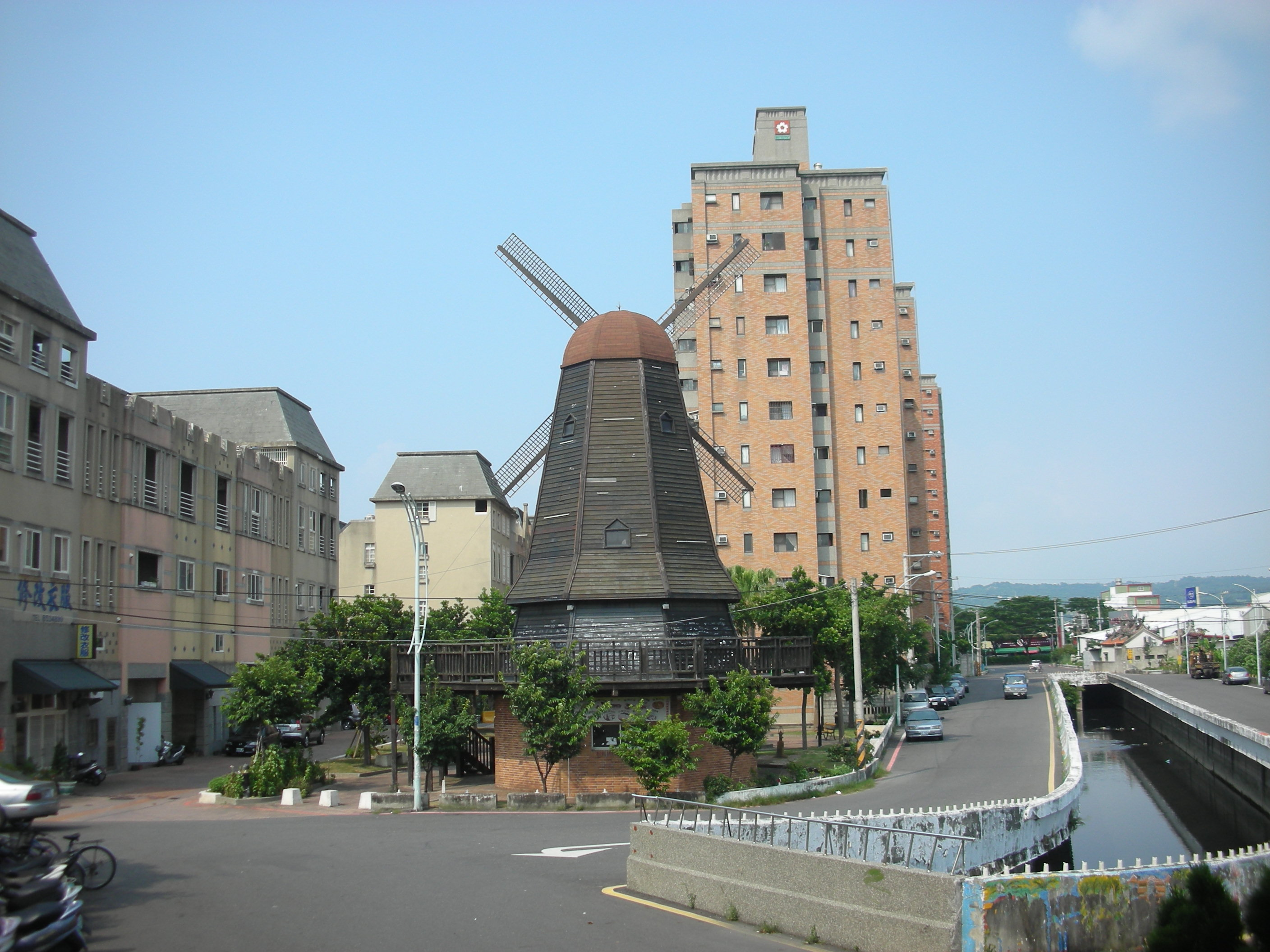
- Dacun Township

- Location within Taiwan
- Coordinates: 23°59′28″N 120°32′22″E
- Country: Taiwan
- County: Changhua

Area
  - Total: 30.78 km^{2} (11.88 sq mi)

Population (January 2023)
  - Total: 40,459
  - Density: 1,314/km^{2} (3,404/sq mi)
- Postal code: 515
- Website: www.chcg.gov.tw/TSO/dacun/index.aspx (in Chinese)

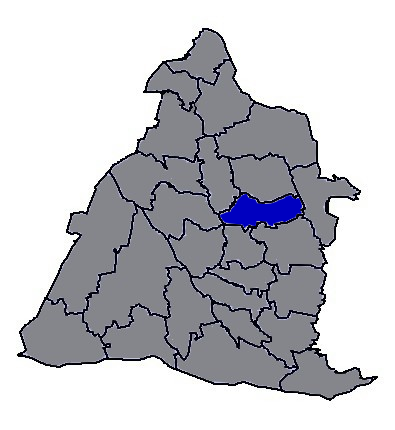
Dacun Township in Changhua County

Dacun Township (Chinese: 大村鄉; pinyin: Dàcūn Xiāng) is a rural township in Changhua County, Taiwan.

== Geography ==
Dacun encompasses 30.78 square kilometres (11.88 sq mi) and a population of 40,459, including 19,044 males and 17,732 females as of January 2023.

== Administrative divisions ==
The township comprises 16 villages: Baitang, Cunshang, Dacun, Dalun, Daqiao, Fuxing, Gongqi, Guogou, Huangcuo, Jiadong, Jiaxi, Meigang, Nanshi, Pinghe, Tianyang and Xinxing.

== Economy ==
Dacun is Taiwan's largest producer of grapes.

== Education ==
- Dayeh University

== Transportation ==
Dacun Township is served by Dacun Station on the Western Line of Taiwan Railway.

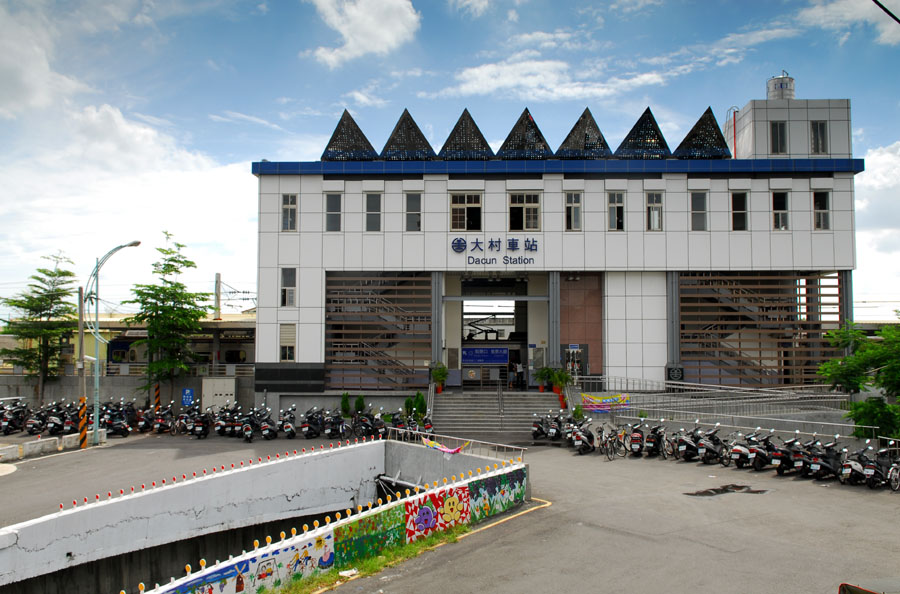
Dacun Station

== Notable natives ==
- George Huang, Magistrate of Changhua County (1981–1989)
- Luo Jye (Chinese: 羅結; pinyin: Luó Jié; 1925 – 2019) billionaire, founder of Cheng Shin Rubber, the world's ninth largest tire manufacturer. At the time of his death, he was the sixth richest person in Taiwan.
