= Dajia (disambiguation) =

Dajia may refer to:

- Dajia District, district in Taichung City, Taiwan
- Dajia River, river in north-central Taiwan
- Dajia Station, railway station in Taichung City, Taiwan
- Dajia Jenn Lann Temple, temple in the eponymous district in Taichung, Taiwan
- Peter Dajia (born January 27, 1964) is a Canadian shot putter
- Tencent Dajia, an opinion blog
