= Rinan (disambiguation) =

Rinan was the southernmost commandery of the Chinese Han dynasty.

Rinan may also refer to:

- Rinan railway station, a railway station on the Taiwan Railways Administration West Coast line
- Rinan Village (日南里), Dajia District, Taichung, Taiwan
