= Yuanli railway station =

Railway station in Miaoli, Taiwan

Yuanli Station 苑裡車站
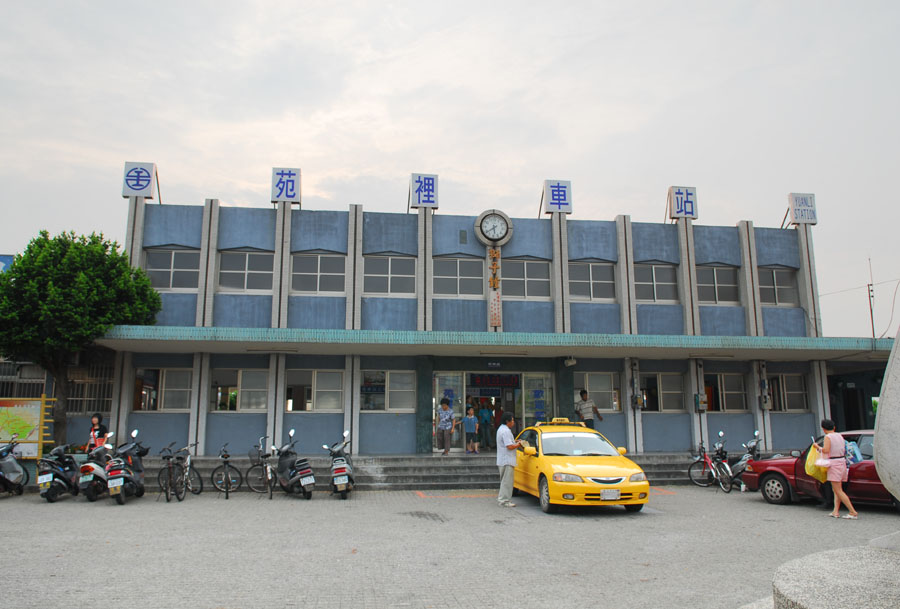

General information
- Location: Yuanli, Miaoli County, Taiwan
- Coordinates: 24°26′35.9″N 120°39′04.2″E
- System: Train station
- Owner: Taiwan Railway Corporation
- Operator: Taiwan Railway Corporation
- Line: Western Trunk line
- Train operators: Taiwan Railway Corporation

History
- Opened: 11 October 1922

Passengers
- 3,147 daily (2024)
Location

Yuanli (Chinese: 苑裡車站; pinyin: Yuànli Chēzhàn) is a railway station on the Taiwan Railway West Coast line (Coastal line) located in Yuanli Township, Miaoli County, Taiwan.

== History ==
The station was opened on 11 October 1922.

== See also ==
- List of railway stations in Taiwan

Preceding station	Taiwan Railway	Following station
Tongxiao towards Keelung	Western Trunk line	Rinan towards Pingtung
