= Huang Poren =

Taiwanese sculptor

Artist Huang Poren
- 黃柏仁
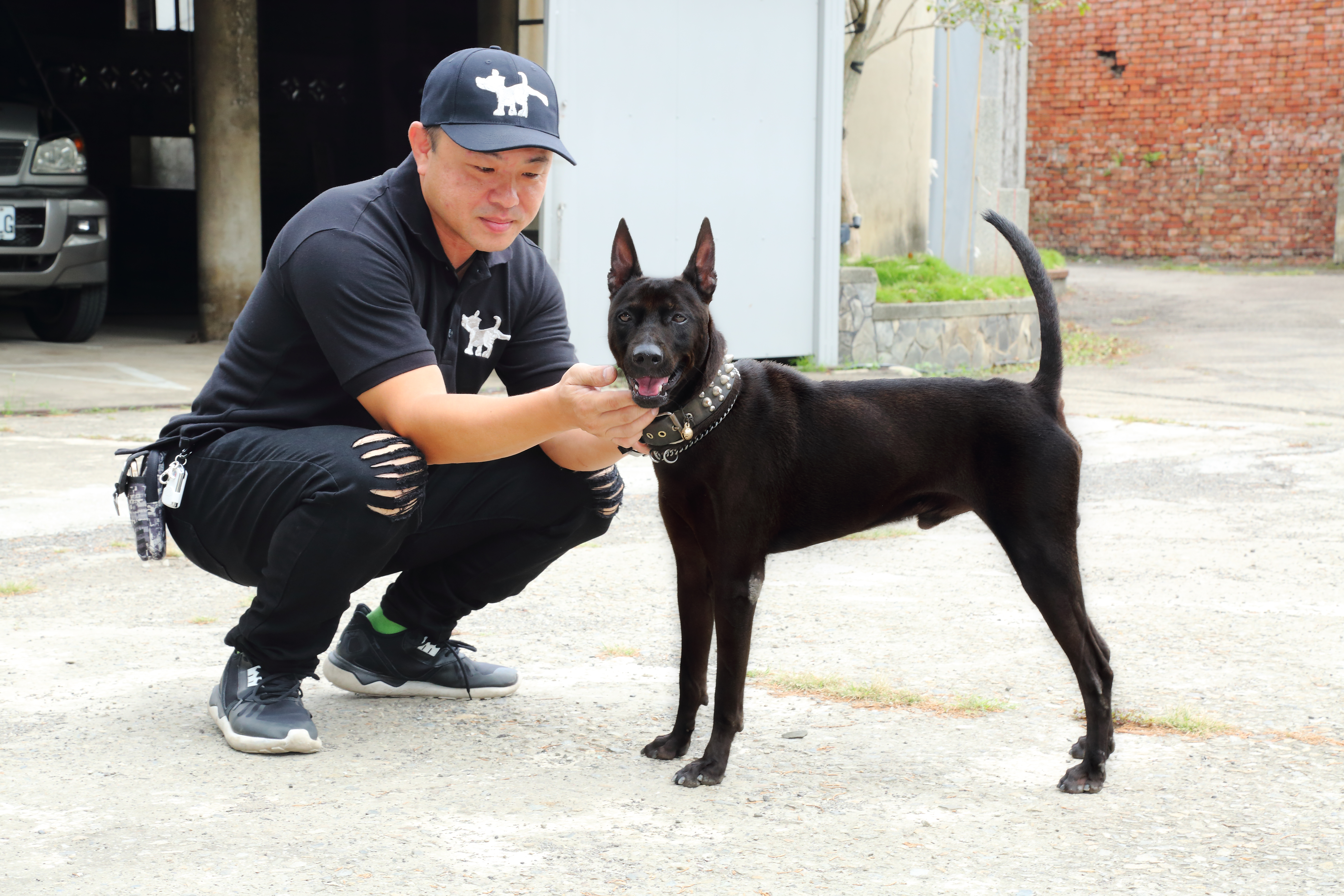
- The Dog's Notes by Huang Poren
- Born: 1970 (age 55–56); Taichung
- Education: Fu-Hsin Trade & Arts School
- Known for: Contemporary Art-Sculpture
- Notable work: Iron Wood Forest; The Dog's Notes; The Vision; i Dog

Huang Poren (Chinese: 黃柏仁; pinyin: Huáng Bòrén; born 1970), a Taiwanese sculptor, was born in Taichung, Taiwan. His ancestral homeland is Fujian, China. His grandfather and parents engaged in wood carving business. In his youth, he majored in sculpture at Fu-Hsin Trade & Art School. In 2001, Huang Poren had joined Graz International Sculpture Exhibition in Austria. He has also participated in several prominent art fairs in both Taiwan and overseas. His well-known pieces include aboriginal-figures and personified dogs. The National Taiwan Museum of Fine Art has already collected two of his works. His work "The Archer" has been published in textbooks for senior high school students in Taiwan.

== Early life and family ==
Huang Poren was born into a family of woodcarvers in Dajia District, Taichung. Both his grandfather and father were engaged in the woodcarving industry. During its heyday between 1960 and 1980, more than 100 woodcarvers were ceaselessly working at the Huang's woodcarving factory. They even had to sleep at the factory's dormitory at night. The scale of the woodcarving factory was very big; the products were exported to various countries. The land where the factory situated is very big and stored a lot of woodcrafts. A single piece of unprocessed high-end wood costs more than US$30,000 at that time. Since security systems were not installed at that time, Formosan Mountain Dogs were used to guard the factory and home in order to prevent the woods from getting stolen. The Huang's Formosan Mountain Dogs have existed continuously for generations; hence Huang Poren grew up in an environment surrounded by sculptures and Formosan Mountain Dogs.

Huang Poren has an innate sense of delicacy and fancifulness. In today's society, he has his own distinct thoughts toward human nature and generational changes. He wants to transmit his thoughts through new art creations instead of duplicating craft (such as 80,000 pieces of the same Guan Gong sculptures). However, his father threatened to "renounce" him if he became an artist. He wanted him to continue producing wood sculptures, so that he could at least have a steady income. His father had no choice but to use the threatening tone because there were quite a few woodcarvers who had left the woodcarving factory in the hope of becoming romantic artists. However, they ended up suffering from the strain of poverty. Moreover, Huang Poren is the only male child in the family, as he has several sisters, but his father already advanced in age. Thus, his father was very worried that his son would be starved to death if pursued artistic works, he had no choice but to threaten him.

Since graduating from the sculpting group of Fu-Hsin Trade & Arts School in 1989, he did not run away from home like other romantic artists. Instead, he designated a small area at the factory for himself. He used wood, metal, rocks, and other cheap sculpting materials, and he strived to participate in sculpting competitions in various places. Throughout the years, he has received numerous awards. He has also attracted numerous visits from the media. His father then became aware of the matter, but he could not help in worrying his son.

Through The Dog's Notes, Huang Poren expresses that he will never abandon either his family or his creative artworks.

== Style ==
Huang Poren's sculpture works concern Taiwanese aboriginals and Formosan Mountain Dog. Because of his great admiration for aboriginals' innocence and perseverance, the sculptor's early works, created from iron or wood, express their unique culture and difficult life vividly. With regard to The Dog's Notes series, those Formosan Mountain dogs raised by Huang Poren's family are a rich source of inspiration for him. It is taken for granted that dogs are the most trustworthy animals to human beings; however, dogs can also be a symbol of Freedom and Friendship to a Human Character, as being snobbish or fawning. Some of Huang Poren's bronze dogs even resemble the appearance of a man.

Starting 2005, Huang Poren created The Dog's Notes to express his care and loyalty toward his family. Although the elders were not being understanding, he has tried really hard to express himself. While using humorous ways to convey his ideas, he has also demonstrated his determination for guarding the freedom of creative artworks. In 2007, When Poren Huang's father died. He accompanied his father through the last days of his life in the hospital and he created the sculpture Every Day is a New Start.

== The Dog's Notes ==
The Dog's Notes is not meant to be a lifelike sculpture, but a simplified approach to create an artistic concept. Poren Huang hopes to attract his audience, and hence deliberately enlarged the heads to render them amusing. Whether dog or human-like sculptures, the chest is often prominent. Since the chest of a short-haired dog tends to be protruding, Huang Poren exaggerated its perspective to emphasize confidence or a strong heart. In addition, the nose is also enlarged and the eyes omitted because dogs have weak eyesight but a sensitive sense of smell. The body of the sculpture tends to be strong and powerful, often with the head held high and even a little arrogant to arouse in audience the urge to whack its head. Due to their high melting points and durability, copper and the occasional stainless steel are mainly used in The Dog's Notes to emphasize eternity. Some of the works are welded with three layers of 99-percent pure-gold foils to further convey the idea of light or extreme positivity. The Dog's Notes further emerges into two new series entitled The Vision and i Dog.

== Humanized-dog works ==
Using the dog as a creative starting point, each piece of work is suggestive of the "human". About ten to ninety percent of the works borrow from the dog to explore various human behaviors. Modern people generally feel kindly toward dogs because of their ability to soothe. Therefore, Huang Poren uses the dog as his creative theme to convey positive traits such as self-confidence, courage, loyalty or innocence, and to provoke in people deeper thoughts as they come in contact with his work. Many people are first attracted by the amusing forms; however, after a period of contact and interaction with the pieces, they seem to sense the deeper significance and remain inspired by positive ideas and thoughts.

There are primarily two types of animals that appear in The Dog's Notes, the dog and the panda. They share a common characteristic of being humanized. These animals do not appear completely animal-like under Huang Poren's sculpting, but instead, they appear to have the scent of a human. When the dog and the panda enter the human's environment, they naturally learn to cohabitate with humans. They lose the wild nature of being wild animals, and become more humanized. People are the same way. Huang Poren wishes that humans can be more inspired by the dogs, and to learn the positive characters found in dogs, such as innocence, loyalty, kindness, bravery, and being passionate. Much like the Chinese proverb, "The son does not despise the mother for being ugly, and the dog does not blame the owner for being poor"; the dog will not despite the owner, and will not leave the owner, instead he will spend the rest of his life by his owner's side. Humans, on the other hand are different. They might look down on others or alienate others. They might even become disrespectful toward parents. The selfishness of humans causes wars and unrest in the world. Therefore, Poren Huang is not just creating artworks of animals, but instead, he is making his sculptures more humanized, so that the viewers can naturally reflect and be inspired.

== Influences ==
=== Formosan Mountain Dogs ===
Formosan Mountain Dogs, characterized by short black fur, upright curled tail, staunch loyalty to its master, strong learning ability, adaptability, and intelligence, became an inspiration to Huang Poren. Having once raised more than twenty dogs at the same time, Huang Poren had frequently helped in the birthing of puppies, and observed that many qualities of the breed, such as standing tall, positivity, and vibrant spirit, happened to be lacking in people living in modern society. On the other hand, people today are unable to cope with stress, and are often self-defeating and depressed. Moreover, the alienation between people, especially apathy among relatives, has resulted in modern people replacing humans with dogs for companionship because despite venting their emotional ups and downs on their pets, dogs remain faithful and obedient.

=== Confucianism ===
During the 1970s, Huang Poren's father, Huang Mingde, had a successful wood carving business and huge export volume. As a major wood carving factory in Taiwan, the factory employed more than 100 craftsmen to produce wood handicrafts during peak seasons. Huang Mingde expected his son Huang Poren to inherit the family business, but Huang Poren preferred artistic creation to wood handicraft production, resulting in years of differences between the father and son. In 2005, Huang Poren fully expressed his ideas through his series of works, The Dog's Notes. Although he and his father held different viewpoints, he highly values family interaction. He focused on mending his family relationship before pursuing his personal ambition, and some of his works in The Dog's Notes strongly convey enlightenment and morality. After World War II, with the recovery of the global economy, prosperity and focus on human rights, the hard work of the previous generation is often reciprocated with the disregard, self-centeredness, mockery and impiety of the next generation. In The Dog's Notes, Huang Poren added the quality of loyalty and kindness to purify the human heart and create positive influence.

== Attitude and approach to creation and craft ==
One mold can reproduce one or two bronze sculptures. Most artists use the same mold to reproduce all versions of bronze sculptures, whether there are twenty or thirty versions. Molds can only be used for a certain period of time; most artists use molds continuously, considering replacement only after severe deformation because the bronze sculpture produced will be rather different than the original. Although most people cannot find differences with the naked eye, the artist can definitely spot them. Some sculptures have ninety-nine, 200, or more versions, where the same mold is used; however, Huang Poren insists that a mold can only be used twice, at most.

Therefore, if a bronze sculpture has twenty versions, he would have to make the mold ten times. While this requires a lot of time and work, Huang Poren insists on this. His demands towards the completeness of his works are very high, not allowing even 0.01% of error. Since any slight difference can change the entire feeling, so each version of the sculpture are in line with what he wants, maintaining the best artistic quality.

Huang Poren sometimes takes more than four months to produce a sculpture, in part because he insists on not hiring assistants

When comparing bronze sculptures of the same size by different artists, Huang Poren’s works tend to feel heavier. This is because he uses a greater thickness of material. As a result, they have a noticeably solid, weighty feel when handled. Additionally, since each piece is handmade, the artist controls the flow of molten copper, which leads to slight variations in weight between individual works. He strives to give each piece the highest level of artistic quality, with the intention that his work endures for thousands of years. As a result, his sculptures come at a higher cost. The artwork is not only a symbol of expensive decorative taste for the home, but also a sacred domain for the soul. Everybody works hard his/her entire life to make him/herself better. Let us be content easily, like dogs. Let us be pure, confident, humorous, and joyful, so that our lives will shine positive light every day.

== Exhibitions ==
Huang Poren's sculptures have received both institutional recognition and widespread private interest. His works are featured in Taiwanese educational curricula and held in major public museum collections across Taiwan. Beyond his domestic presence, Huang has established an international collector base throughout Asia, including Taipei, Hong Kong, Beijing, Singapore, Seoul and Tokyo, with growing representation in Europe, the Middle East, and the United States.

Huang Poren encourages his collectors to play with and touch his works and, through constant contact, feel the heritage within the creations. One collector initially thought of The Dog's Notes as rugged, but through constant handling and awareness, realized that The Dog's Notes is in fact refined. Each faintly discernible line and block manifests a different pose, and the more consideration and handling of the works, the more feelings are discovered. The artistic expression of the heart and mind with the works happens only through precise finger manipulation, which is a type of art therapy. In addition to appreciating each piece of work in The Dog's Notes with the eyes, an important aspect is the passion arising from the interaction of mind and body through touching. Each staggered arrangement of explicit and implicit lines reveals unlimited artistic character while narrowing the distance between the viewer and work until the two become one. The indubitable intimacy, quiet and reliable sense of security, and inspiration to deeper meaning make The Dog's Notes an artistic feast. The artist has not only become the Creator, creating the true meaning of freedom and creating a personal world view, but has also become the observer endowed with a limited life that offers infinite possibilities.

== Collections ==
In the Art Taipei 2006 art fair, his work, Happy Time (2006), was acquired by the National Taiwan Museum of Fine Arts, which again acquired another of his works, Wise Man, during the "Art Taipei" 2008.

== Publications ==
- 2003: "Flying Over The Jurassic Period" by Jin-Lung Chen, Published by Taiwan Daily, Taipei Taiwan.
- 2005: "The Dog’s Notes: vivid Bronze Dogs" by Ming-Hui Chang, Published by United Daily News, Taipei, Taiwan.
- 2005: "Huang Po-Ren Sculpture: Iron. Wood. Forest; The Dog’s Notes" by Huang Poren, Published by Taichung County Cultural Center, Taichung, Taiwan.
- 2006: "Huang Poren's Sculptures expresses the spirit of The Formosan Dogs", A6, Published By Min Sheng Daily, Taipei, Taiwan.
- 2006: "The Dog's Notes", Published by Taiwan News, Taipei, Taiwan.
- 2009: "Huang Poren Transforms the traditional wood sculpture into Modern Art" by Chen-yin Hsu. Published by Commercial Times.
- 2011: "Exploring the relationship between dogs and human" by Fu-Chen Tsai, Published by Merit Times Co., Ltd.
- 2014: "The Dog's Notes" by Huang Poren, Published by Powen Gallery, Taipei, Taiwan.
- 2015: "The Loved One" on the cover of Artco Magazine, Published by Art & Collection Group, Taipei, Taiwan.
- 2015: "Return to Innocence-Huang Poren's "The Dog's Notes" by Max Chaplin, Artco no.268, pp. 82–89, Published by Art & Collection Group, Taipei, Taiwan.
- 2015: "Huang Poren—Iron Wood Forest and The Dog's Notes" By Powen Lee, Artco no.269, pp. 156–157, Published by Art & Collection Group, Taipei, Taiwan.
- 2016: Spielzeug und Vorbild: Die Hundeskulpturen des taiwanesischen Künstlers Poren Huang", The Coverage by Susanne Braun for the exhibition in Berlin.
- 2016: "Bright Star overseas-Poren Huang and Powen Gallery", Art. Investment no.99, pp. 94–97, Published by Art & Collection Group, Taipei, Taiwan.
- 2015: Dog Philosophy—Life Revelation of Huang Poren by Chen Fanling, Art. Investment no.89, pp. 196–197, Published by Art & Collection Group, Taipei, Taiwan.
- 2016: "Look at those dogs! On Huang Poren's Spiritual Metonymy", Featured Article by Wu, Shuann, Artco no.287, pp. 68–71, Published by Art & Collection Group, Taipei, Taiwan.
- 2016: "THE DOG'S NOTES BY Huang Poren", Featured Article by NICOLAS SIMONEAU, KALTBLUT Magazine, ART Section, Published by Marcel Schlutt and Nicolas Simoneau, Berlin.
- 2016: "Marching Forward Alongside Eagle With Head Held High" by Chang Li-Hao, Artco no.290, pp. 106–109, Published by Art & Collection Group, Taipei, Taiwan.
- 2017: "Huang Poren'S PHILOSOPHY ON ART AND INTERNATIONAL OUTLOOK" by Clément Rechaussat, Artco no.292, pp. 52–59, Published by Art & Collection Group, Taipei, Taiwan.
