= Military Memorial Park =

Memorial park in Dajia, Taichung, Taiwan

- 國軍紀念公園
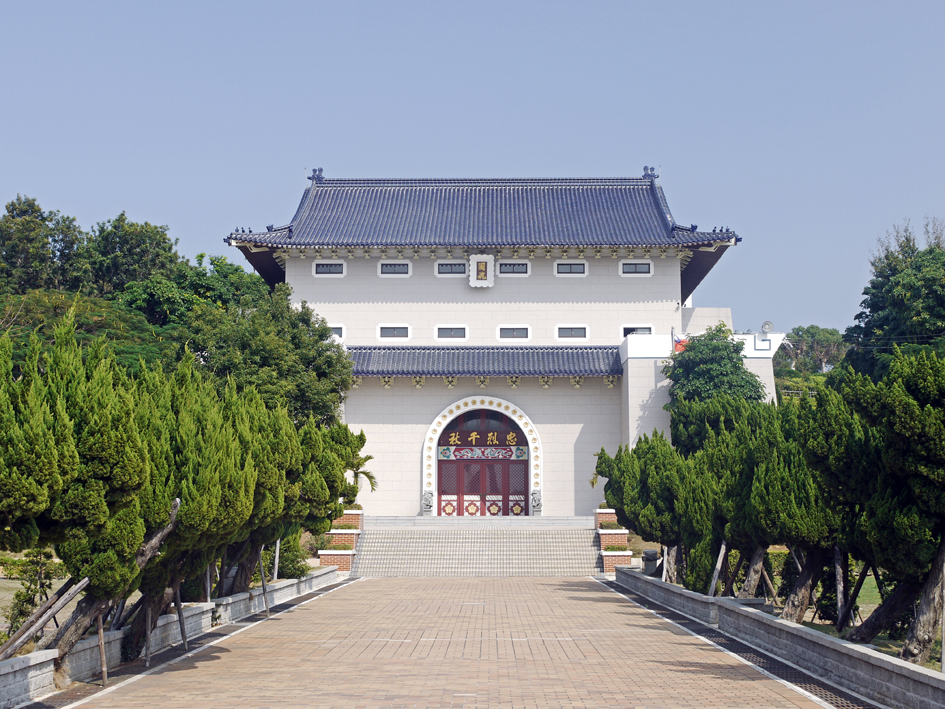
- Interactive map of Military Memorial Park

Details
- Established: July 1958
- Location: Dajia, Taichung, Taiwan
- Coordinates: 24°21′31″N 120°38′46.2″E
- Type: memorial park
- Size: 2.5 hectares

The Military Memorial Park (traditional Chinese: 國軍紀念公園; simplified Chinese: 国军纪念公园; pinyin: Guójūn Jìniàn Gōngyuán) is a memorial park at Mount Tiezhan, Dajia District, Taichung, Taiwan.

== History ==
The construction of the park began in July 1958 for its first stage in which the memorial hall was built. The second stage saw the completion of its water plant, electricity plant, pumping station and path for the cemetery. The final stage of the construction was the beautification of the park in which it was completed in April 1960 which included the various plantation of trees. The memorial hall was rebuilt and reopened in January 1987. In January 1996, the Taichung Military Cemetery was renamed to Taichung Military Martyrs' Shrine.

== Architecture ==
The park occupy an area of 2.5 hectares.

== Transportation ==
The park is accessible northeast of Dajia Station of Taiwan Railway.

== See also ==
- List of tourist attractions in Taiwan
