= Shuntian Temple =

Temple in Miaoli County, Taiwan

- 順天宮
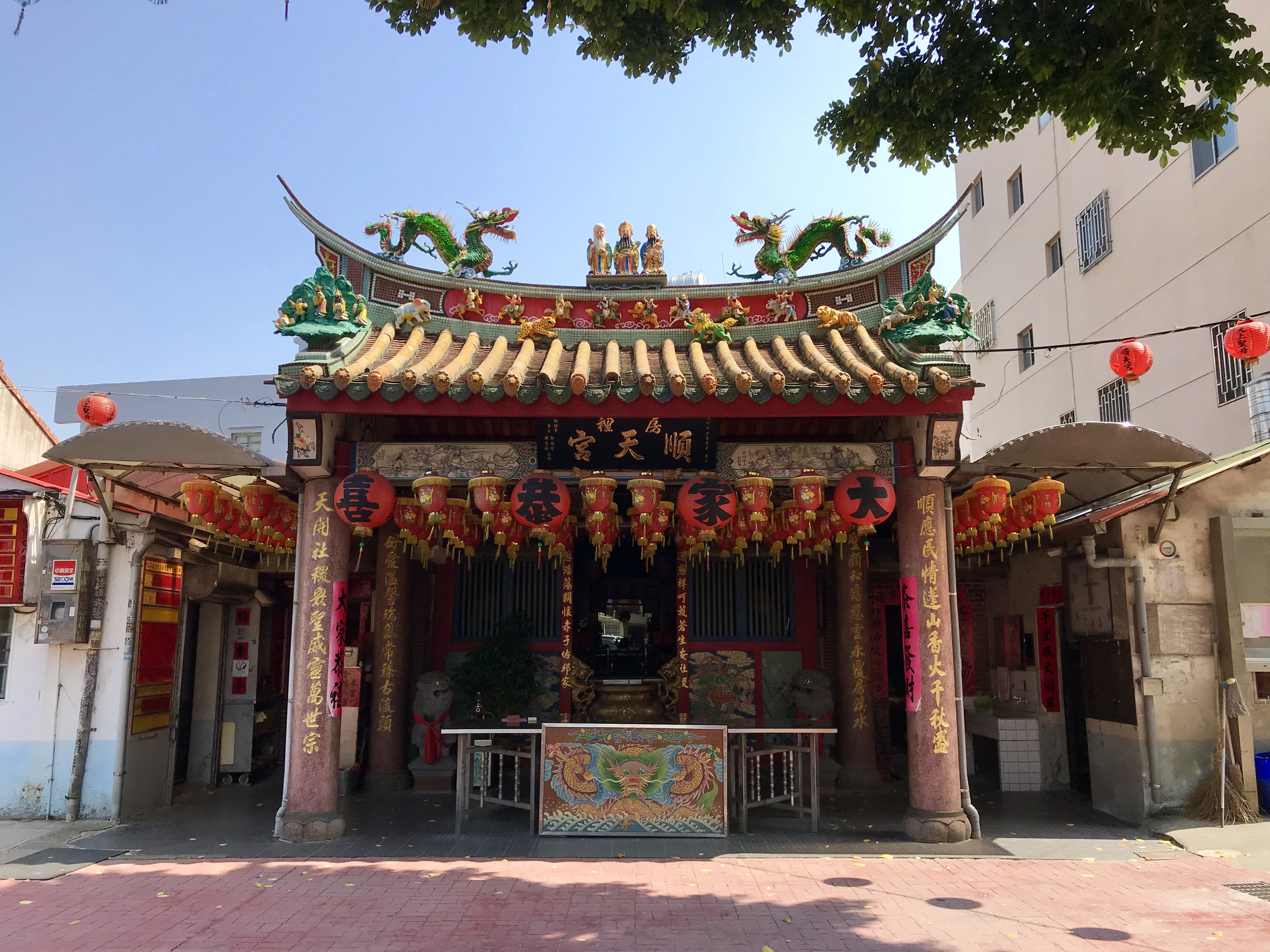
- Facade of the temple

Religion
- Affiliation: Taoism
- Deity: Mazu

Location
- Location: Yuanli, Miaoli County
- Country: Taiwan
- Interactive map of Shuntian Temple
- Coordinates: 24.4351°N 120.6466°E

Architecture
- Completed: 1856
- Direction of façade: West

Yuanli Fangli Shuntian Temple (Chinese: 苑裡房裡順天宮; pinyin: Yuànlǐ Fánglǐ Shùntiān Gōng), alternatively Yuanli Shuntian Temple or Fangli Shuntian Temple, is a temple located in Yuanli Township, Miaoli County, Taiwan. The temple is dedicated to the sea goddess Mazu.

== History ==
In the early 19th century, conflicts between Zhangzhou and Quanzhou settlers in Yuanli caused the two groups to separate themselves, with the former occupying current-day downtown Yuanli and the latter in Fangli, a few kilometers south. City walls were built around Fangli in 1855 to fend off the rival Zhangzhou population. Since the area's original Mazu temple, Pengshan Cihe Temple, was located outside of the walls in Zhangzhou territory, Quanzhou settlers built their own Mazu temple within Fangli in 1856, naming it Shuntian Temple. The two temples became the cultural centers of their respective population; Shuntian Temple was known as the "Mazu inside the walls" (城內媽祖), while Cihe Temple was the "Mazu outside the walls" (城外媽祖).

On 21 October 2010, Shuntian Temple was protected by the Miaoli County Government as a historical building. Between 2011 and 2012, the temple underwent renovation to preserve its structural integrity.

== Architecture ==
While renovated twice in 1926 and 1964, Shuntian Temple still retains many of its architectural features from its founding. The building has one story and is made of rammed earth, but the stone and fir wood used inside are imported from mainland China. There are three plaques hung above doors dating from dating from 1891, 1910, and 1928 respectively. In the main hall, Mazu is seated in the middle alongside Chenghuangye and Zhusheng Niangniang. There are also altars for Xuanwu, Shennong, and Wudouxingjun in side halls.

Originally, there were two Chinese banyan trees on each side of the temple plaza that were at least one hundred years old. Unfortunately, the 2015 Typhoon Soudelor toppled one of the trees.
