= Sword Well =

Water well in Dajia, Taichung, Taiwan

- 劍井
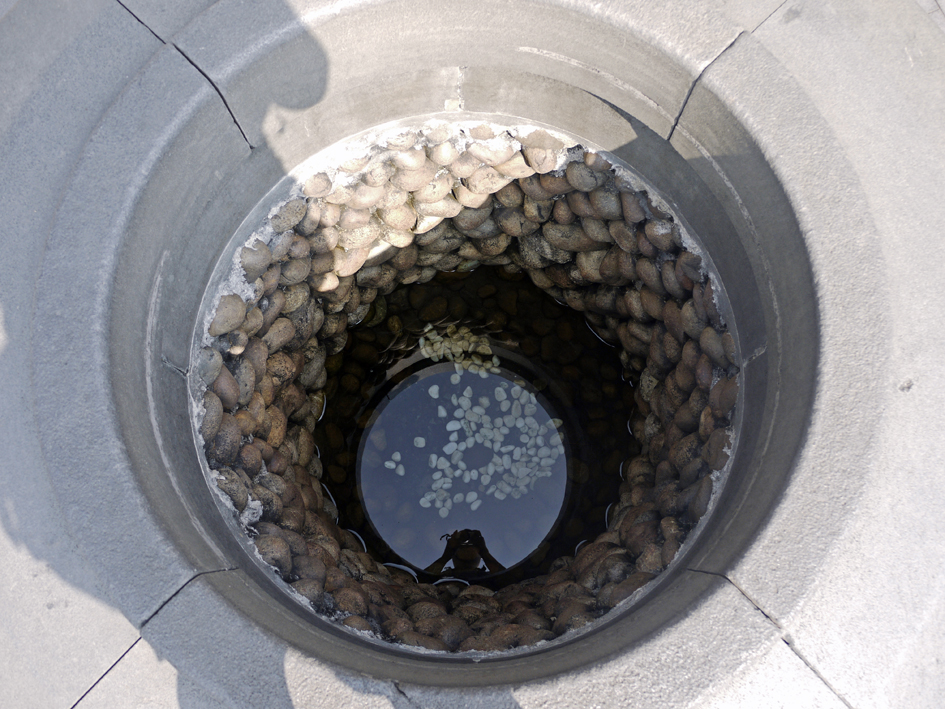
- Interactive map of the Sword Well area

General information
- Type: water well
- Location: Dajia, Taichung, Taiwan
- Coordinates: 24°21′28.9″N 120°38′35.5″E

The Sword Well (traditional Chinese: 劍井; simplified Chinese: 剑井; pinyin: Jiàn Jǐng) or Guoxing Well (traditional Chinese: 國姓井; simplified Chinese: 国姓井; pinyin: Guóxìng Jǐng) is a historical water well in Dajia District, Taichung, Taiwan.

== History ==
According to legend, the well was created from a sword stuck into the ground by Koxinga when he was stationed in the area because he asked God to provide water for his soldiers. The water then poured out from the southern slope of the mountain. The well was named Well of the Imperial Surname (Chinese: 國姓井). In 1953, the local residents repaired the well and built brick wall around it. It was then renamed as the Sword Well (Chinese: 劍井).

== Architecture ==
The well has a diameter of 0.5 meter and a depth of 2 meters.

== See also ==
- List of tourist attractions in Taiwan
