= Naiyou subing =

Taiwanese buttery, flaky pastry made into a thin circle

Nǎiyóu sū bǐng
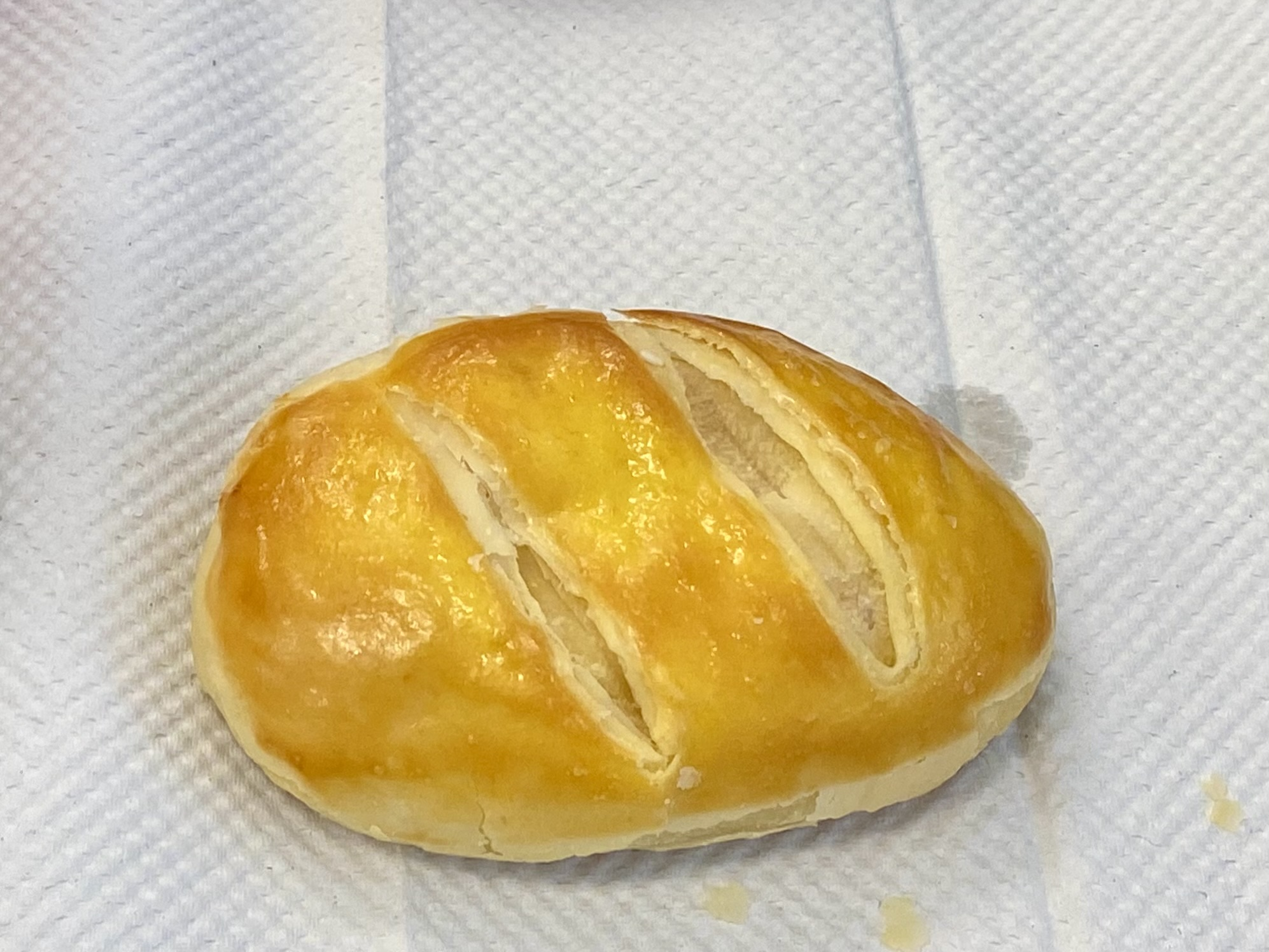
- Type: pastry
- Place of origin: Taiwan
- Region or state: Taichung

A nǎiyóu sū bǐng (Chinese: 奶油酥餅; pinyin: nǎiyóu sūbǐng; lit. 'shortbread') is a buttery flaky pastry made into a thin circle. It is a speciality food in the Dajia District of Taichung, Taiwan. The dough has many layers, of which each is very thin and crisp. The filling is composed of butter and maltose. A typical nǎiyóu sū bǐng has a diameter of approximately 20 centimetres (7.9 in) and a thickness of about 1 centimetre (0.39 in). There is also a smaller variety with a diameter of approximately 10 centimetres (3.9 in).
