= Yuanli =

Urban township in Miaoli County, Taiwan

Coordinates: 24.416829°N 120.683044°E

Yuanli Township 苑裡鎮 Enri
- Urban township
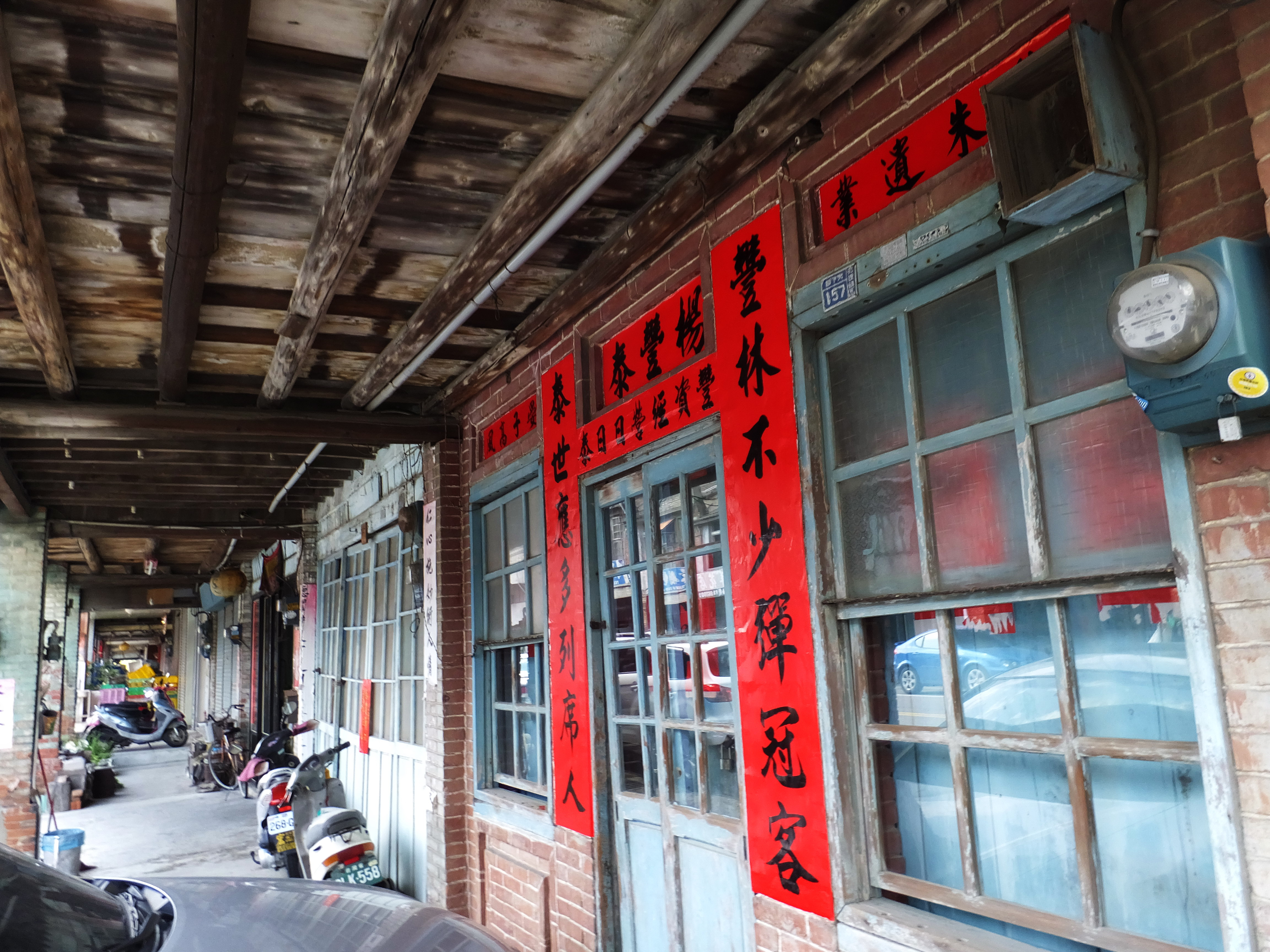
- Old town of Yuanli Township

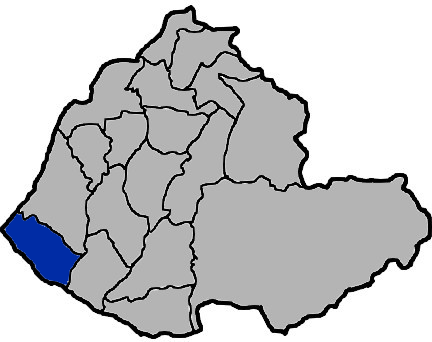
- Yuanli Township in Miaoli County
- Location: Miaoli County, Taiwan

Area
  - Total: 68.25 km^{2} (26.35 sq mi)

Population (January 2023)
  - Total: 43,923
- Website: www.yuanli.gov.tw (in Chinese)

Yuanli Township
- Chinese: 苑裡鎮
- Hanyu Pinyin: Yuànlǐ Zhèn
- Wade–Giles: Yüan^{4}-li^{3} Chen^{4}
- Pha̍k-fa-sṳ: Yen-lî-chṳ́n
- Hokkien POJ: Oán-lí-tìn

Yuanli Township is an urban township in southwestern Miaoli County, Taiwan, occupying an area of 68.25 square kilometres (26.35 sq mi), with a population of 43,923 in January 2023. Yuanli is known as "Miaoli's Granary."

== Economy ==
In the past, the economy of the township relied on the production of mats, hats and hand-made woven products. However, those industries have declined due to the abundance of equivalent industrial cheap goods.

Currently the main economic activity of the township is rice cultivation, where 3,000 hectares of the township land is made up of rice fields.

== Local attractions ==
- Shuntian Temple
- Yuanli Tsai's Old House
