= Dajia railway station =

Railway station located in Taichung, Taiwan

Dajia Station
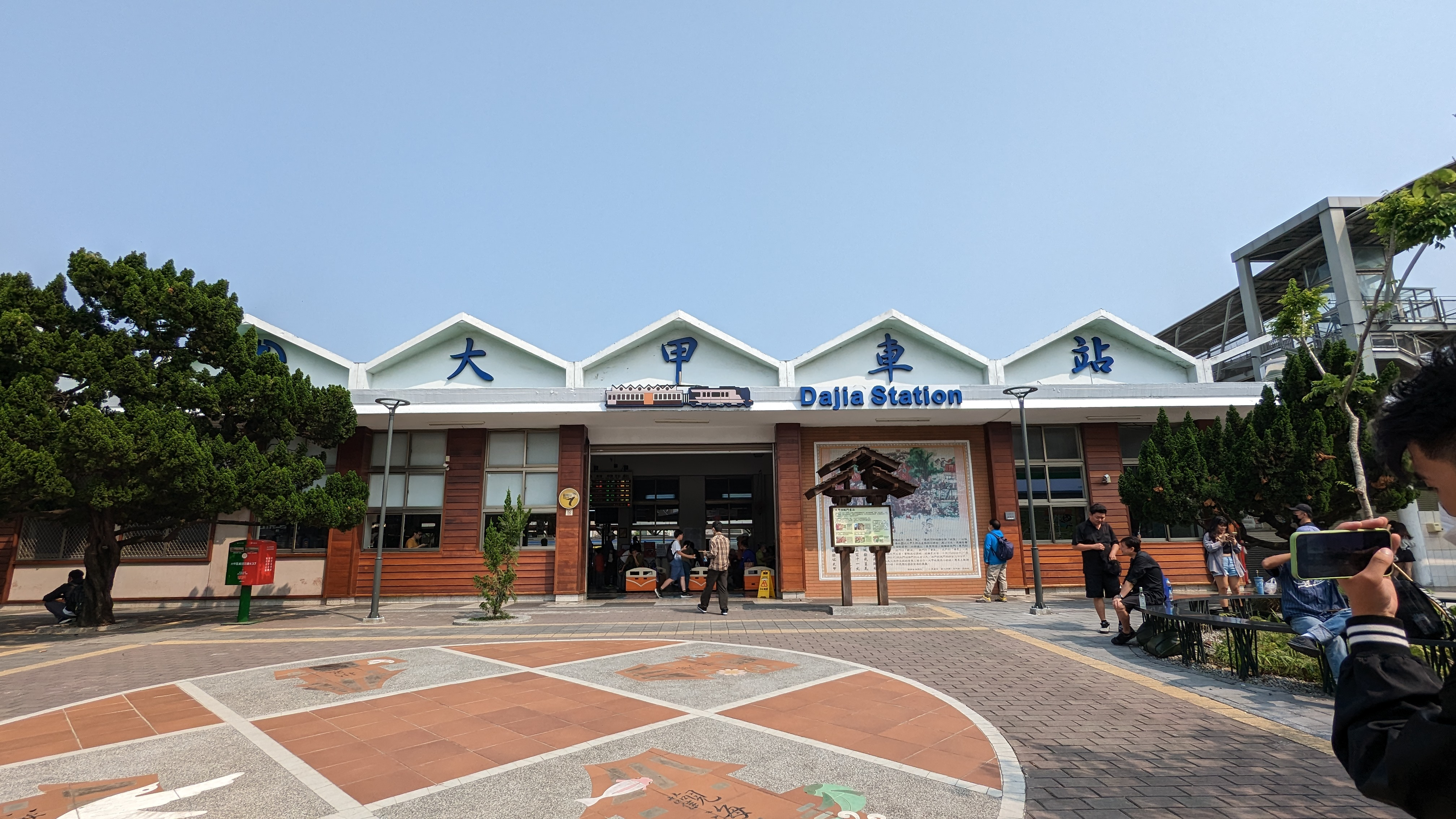

General information
- Location: Dajia, Taichung, Taiwan
- Coordinates: 24°20′40.1″N 120°37′36.9″E
- System: Train station
- Owner: Taiwan Railway Corporation
- Operator: Taiwan Railway Corporation
- Line: Western Trunk line
- Train operators: Taiwan Railway Corporation

History
- Opened: 11 October 1922

Passengers
- 5,954 daily (2024)
Location

Dajia (Chinese: 大甲車站; pinyin: Dàjiǎ Chēzhàn) is a railway station on the Taiwan Railway (TRA) West Coast line (Coastal line) located in Dajia District, Taichung, Taiwan.

== History ==
=== Taiwan Sugar ===
- July 1, 1912: Dajia Station of Sugar Industry Railway (future station) was established.
- September 1, 1970 - Taiwan Sugar Hou A Line was abolished.

== Around the station ==
- Dajia Jenn Lann Temple
- Military Memorial Park

== See also ==
- List of railway stations in Taiwan

Preceding station	Taiwan Railway	Following station
Rinan towards Keelung	Western Trunk line	Taichung Port towards Pingtung
