= Tencent Dajia =

Former opinion blog by Tencent

- Website type: Opinion blog
- Founded: December 15, 2012
- Dissolved: February 19, 2020
- Owner: Tencent
- Website: dajia.qq.com

Tencent Dajia (directly translated as Tencent Master; shortened to Dajia; 大家), also known as iPress, was an opinion blog founded by Tencent on December 15, 2012. It was shut down on February 19, 2020.

Jia Jia served as the editor-in-chief of Tencent Dajia. The blog used to bring together many Chinese liberal intellectuals.

== History ==
On January 27, 2020, Tencent Dajia published an article titled The 50 days of Wuhan pneumonia: Chinese people are all paying the price of the death of media. After this article was published, Dajia suddenly disappeared from the Internet.

On February 19, 2020, an insider disclosed that Tencent had shut down "Dajia" at the request of the Office of the Central Cyberspace Affairs Commission.
