= Dajia Jenn Lann Temple =

Mazu temple in Dajia, Taichung, Taiwan

- 大甲鎮瀾宮
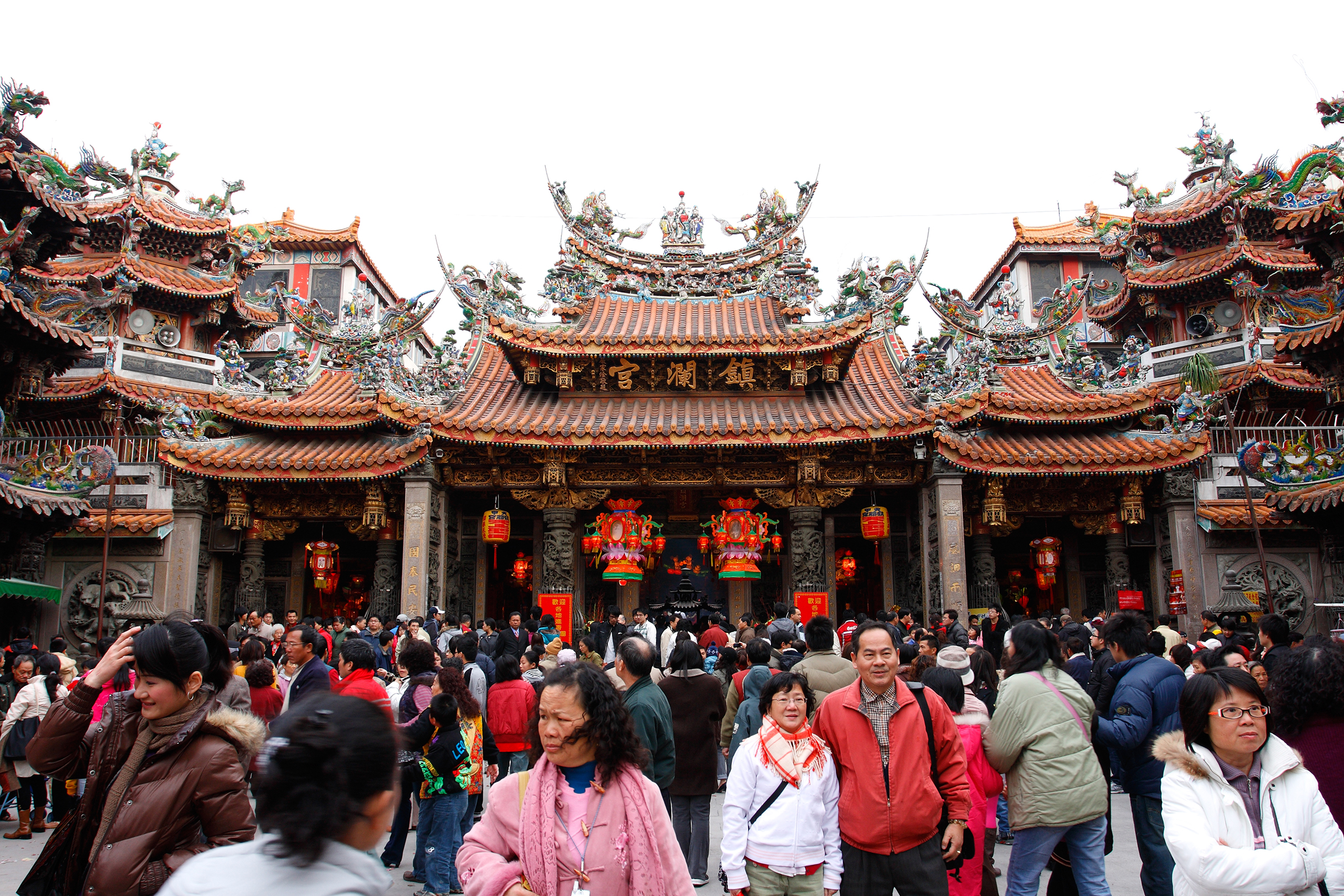

- Location within Taichung

Religion
- Leadership: Yen Ching-piao (chairperson)

Location
- Location: Dajia, Taichung, Taiwan
- Interactive map of Dajia Jenn Lann Temple
- Coordinates: 24°20′42.8″N 120°37′24.9″E

Architecture
- Type: Mazu temple
- Completed: 1730

Dajia Jenn Lann Temple
- Traditional Chinese: 大甲鎮瀾宮
Transcriptions
Standard Mandarin
- Hanyu Pinyin: Dàjiǎ Zhènlán Gōng

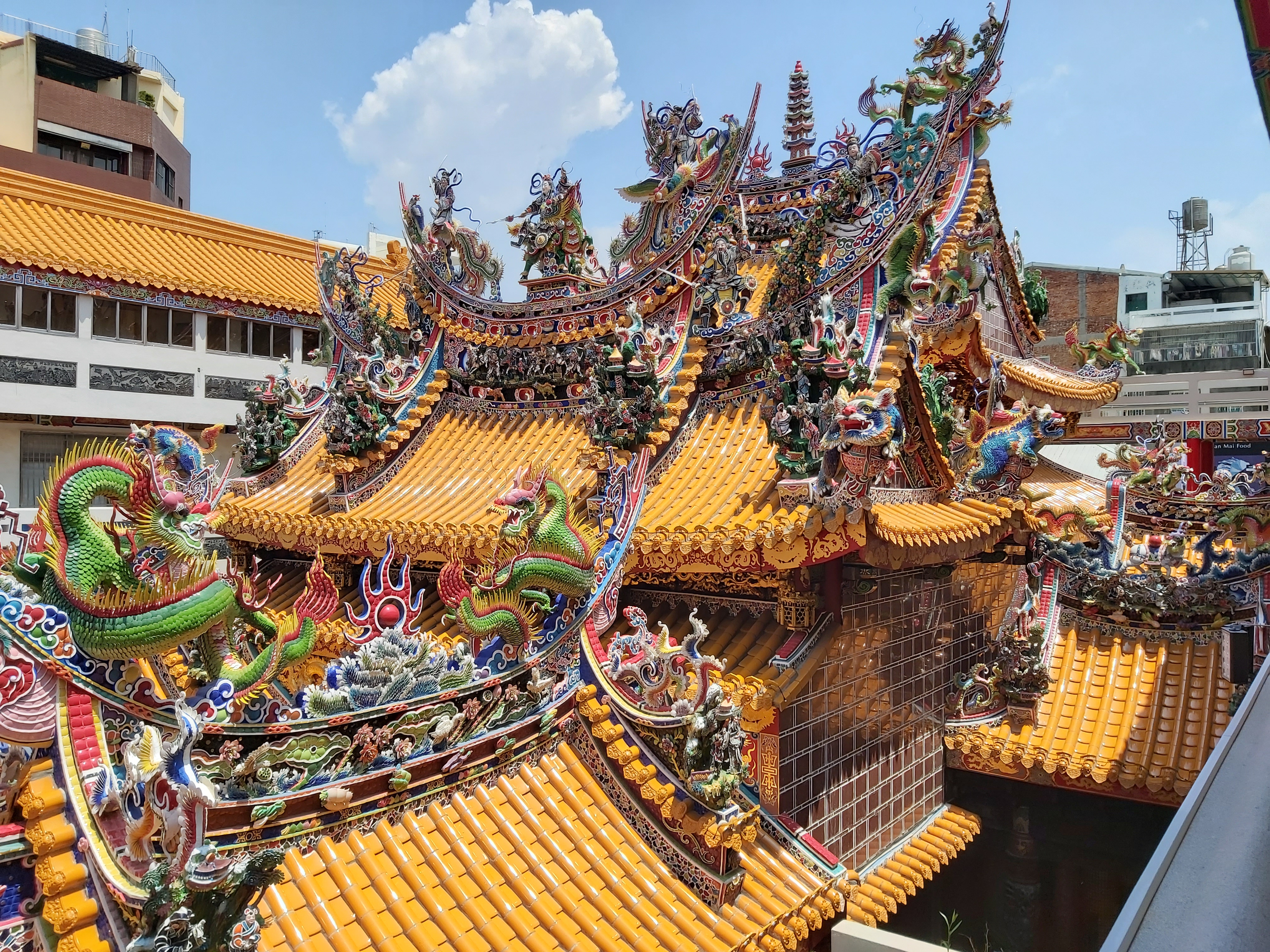
Roof

The Dajia Jenn Lann Temple, also known as the Zhenlan or Mazu Temple, is a temple dedicated to the Chinese Goddess Mazu, the Goddess of Sea and Patron Deity of fishermen, sailors and any occupations related to sea/ocean. The temple is located in the Dajia District of Taichung, Taiwan. It is known for being the start of the Dajia Mazu Pilgrimage, an annual celebration of the sea goddess.

== History ==
The temple started as a small temple in 1730, the 8th year of Yongzheng Era of the Qing Dynasty.

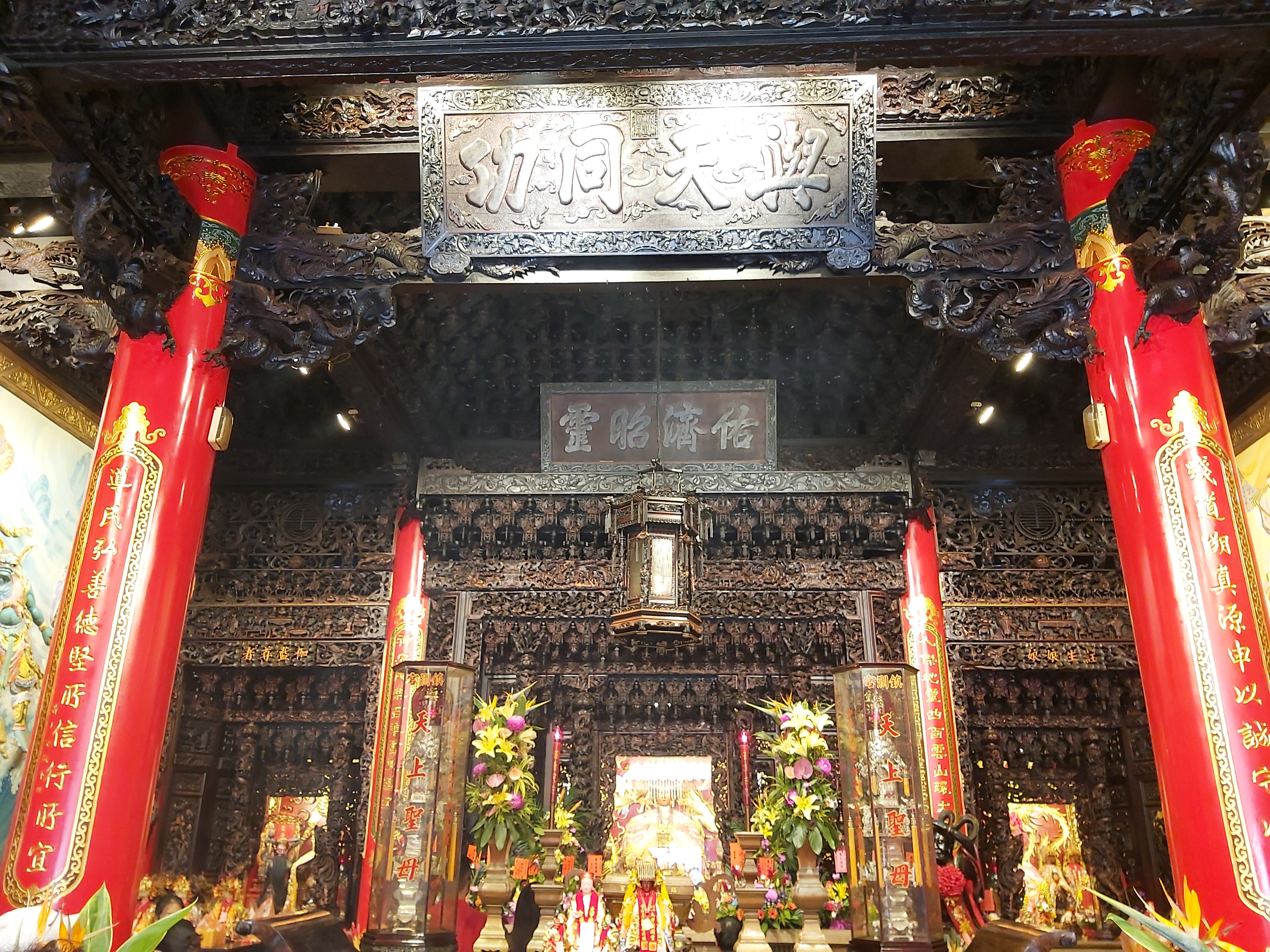
Main Hall

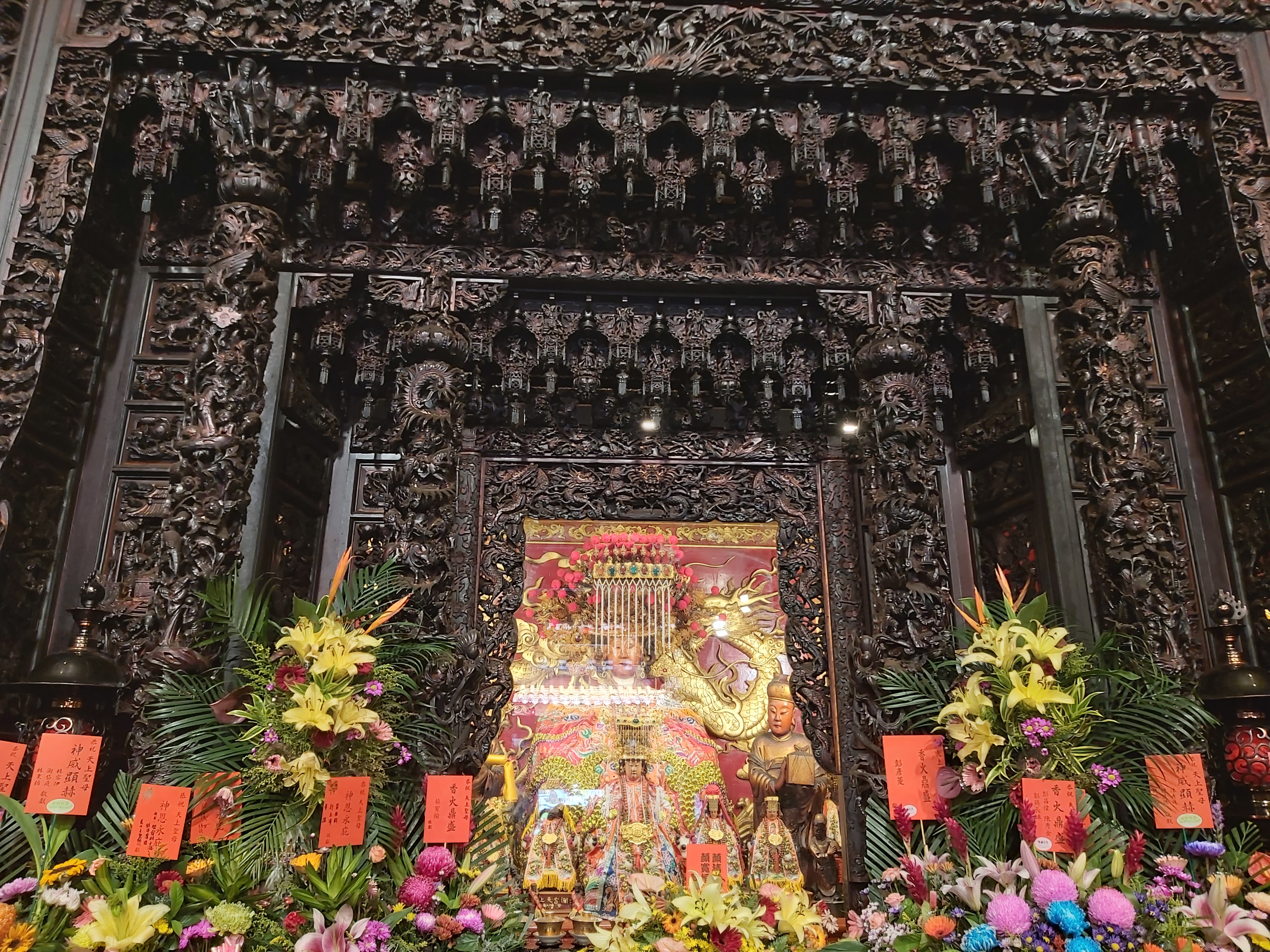
Shrine of Mazu

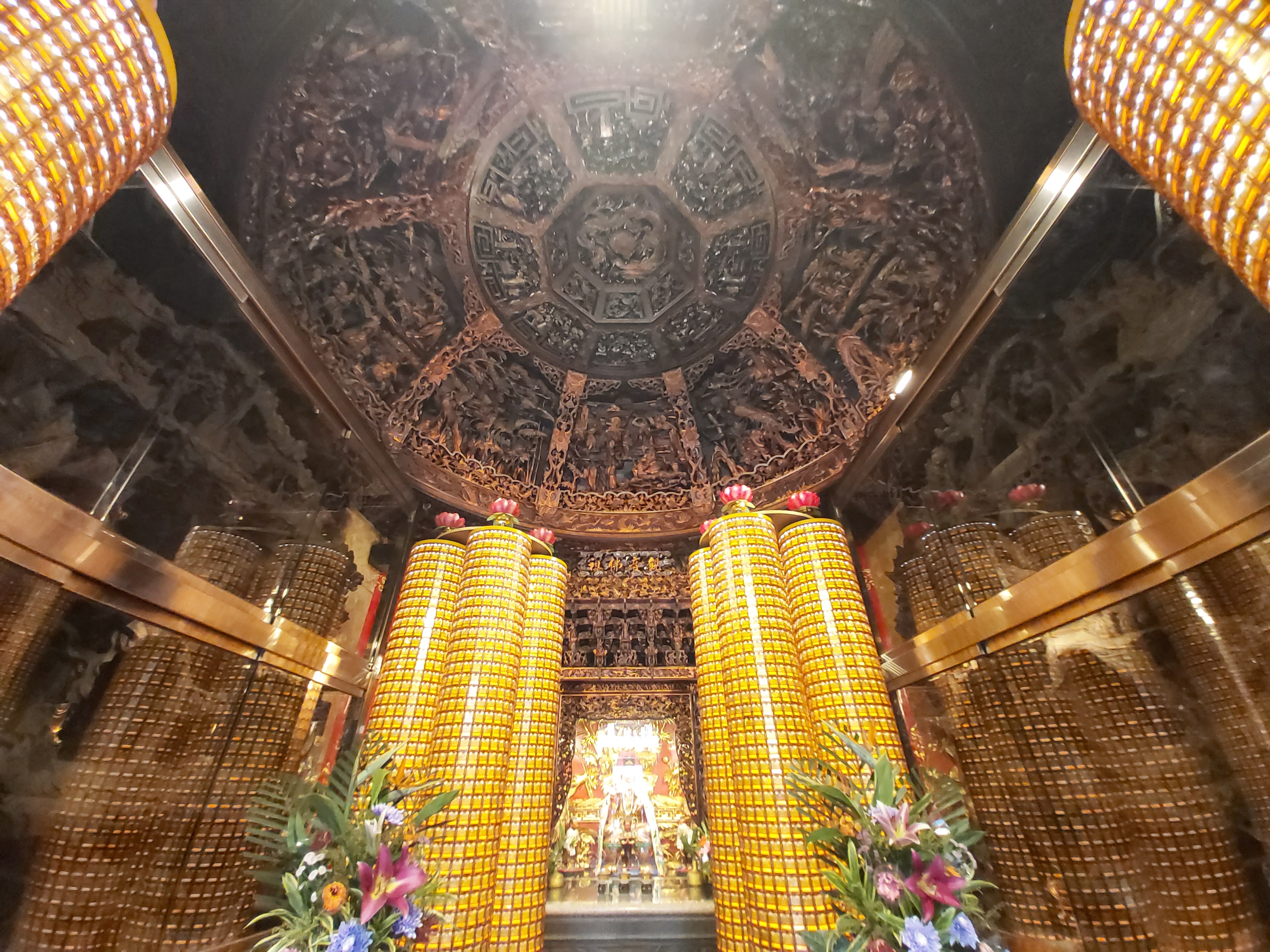
Shrine of Guanyin

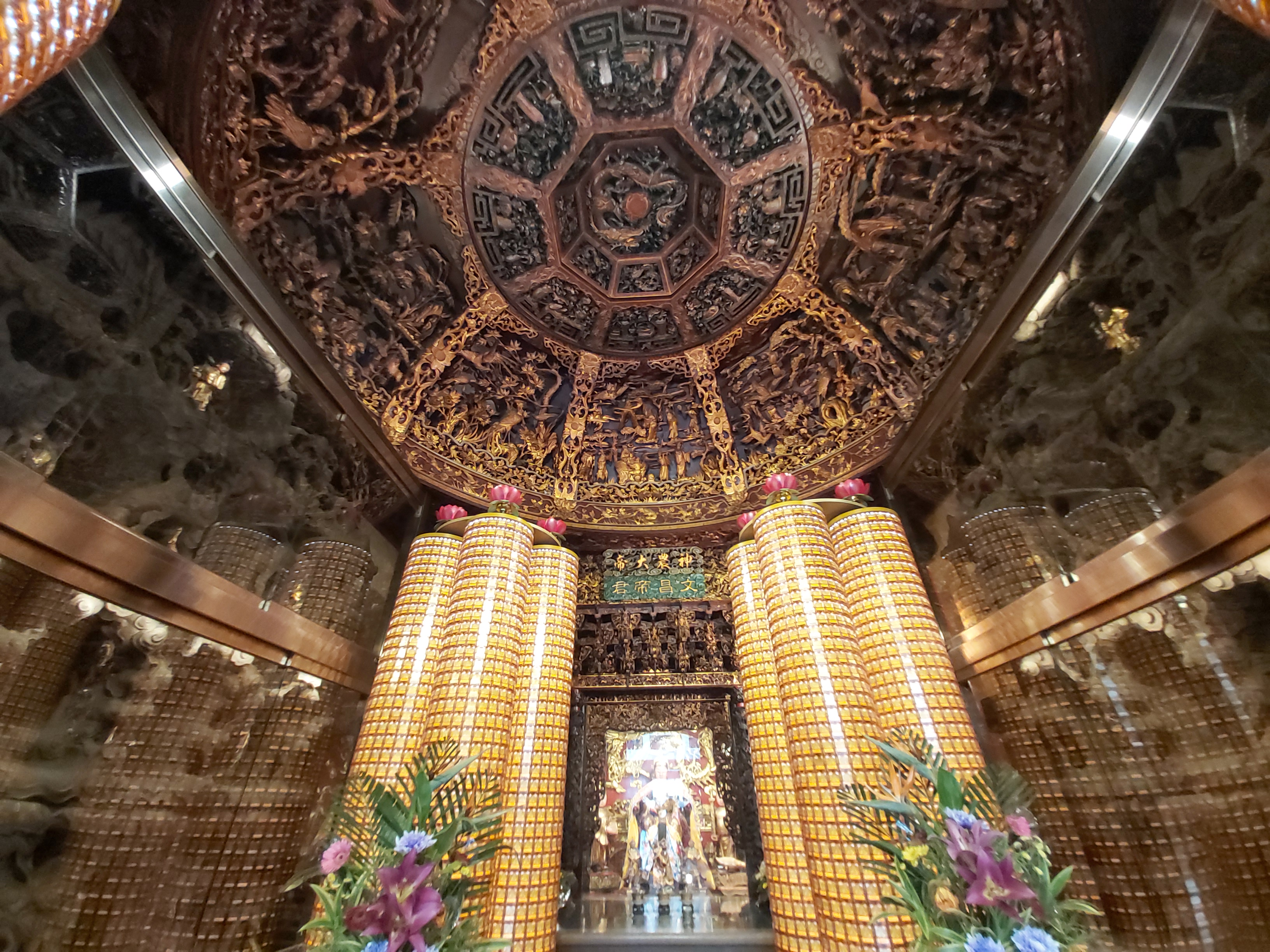
Shrine of Wenchang Wang

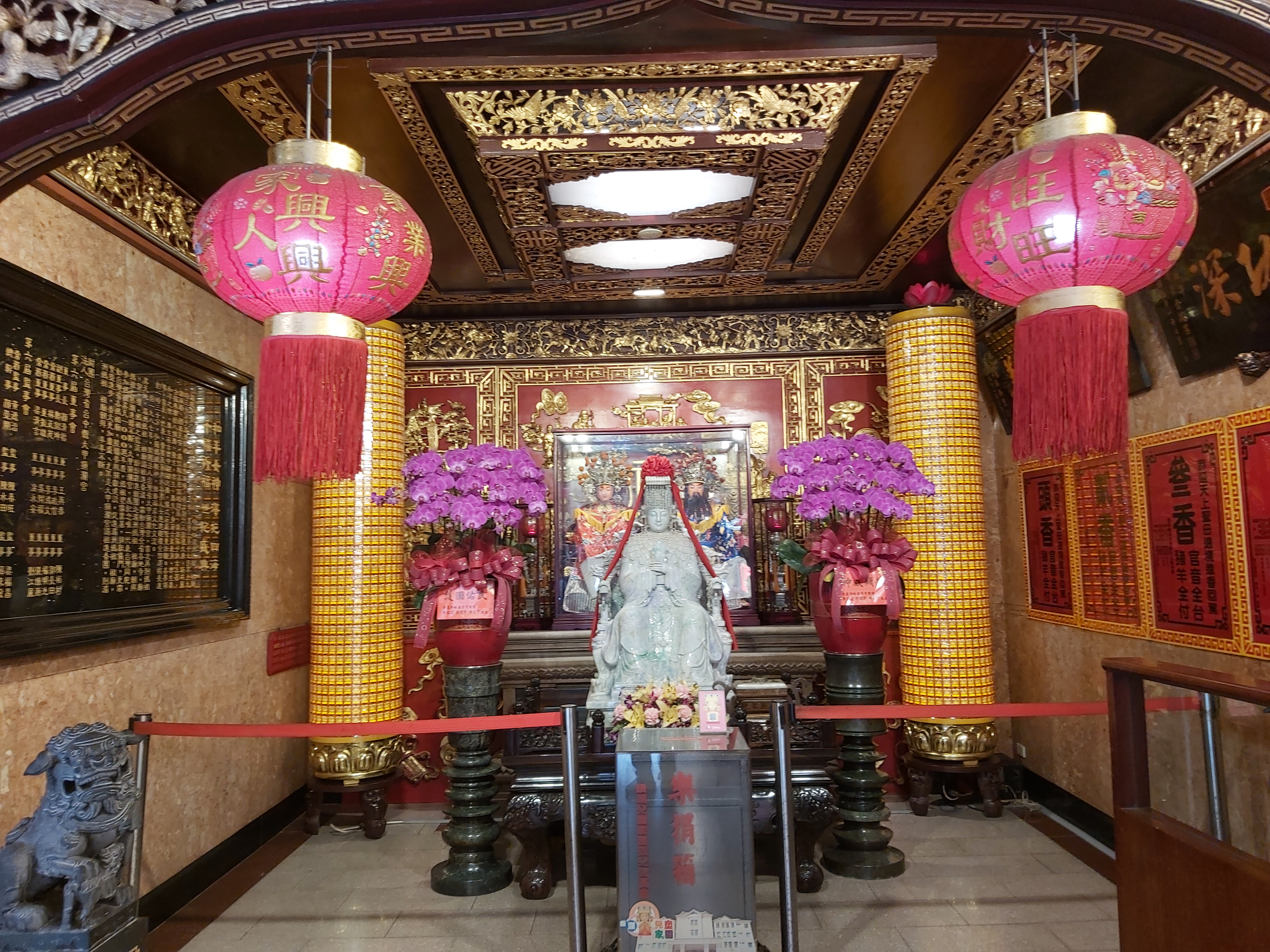
Jadeite Mazu Statue

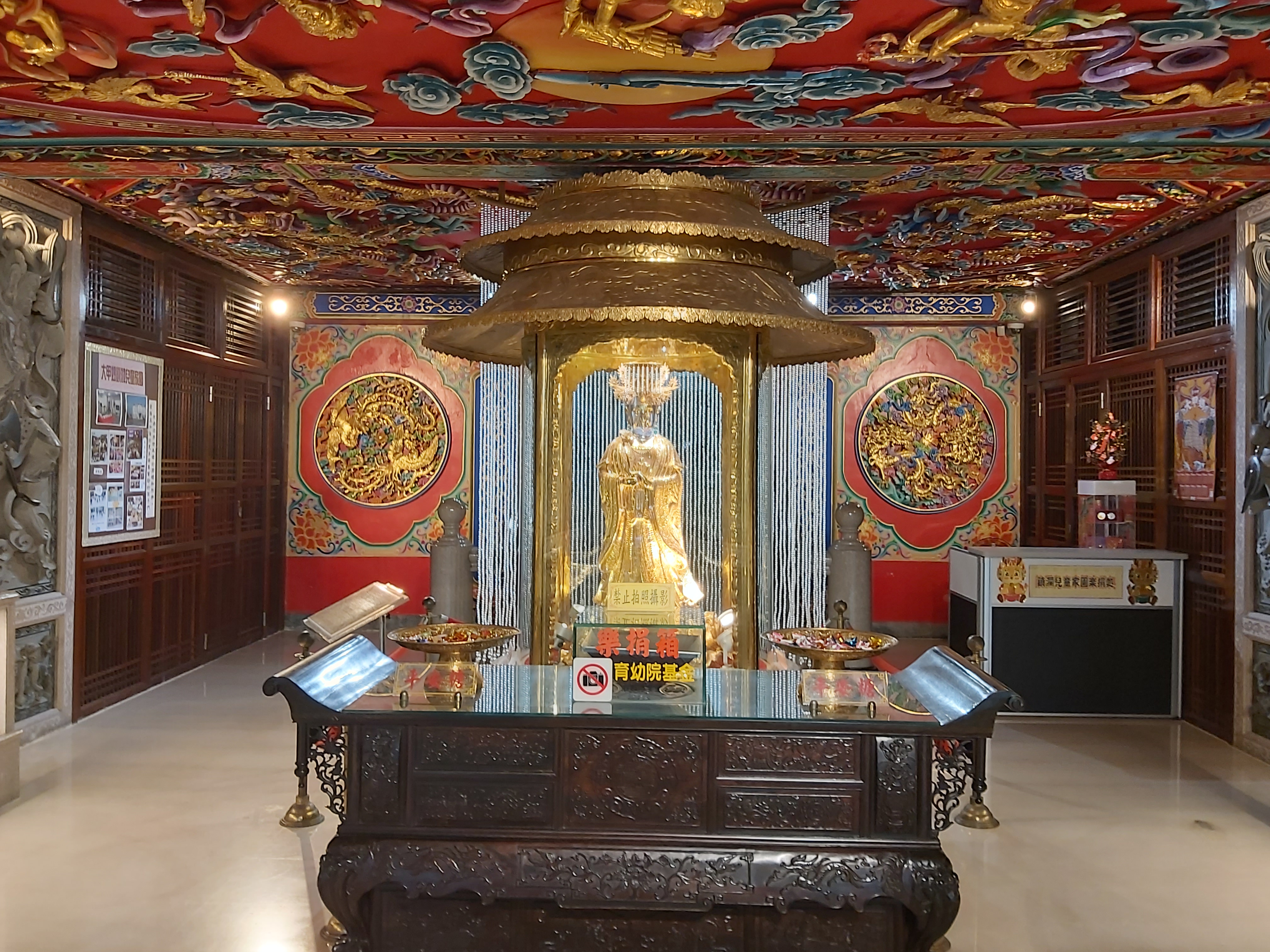
Gold Mazu Statue

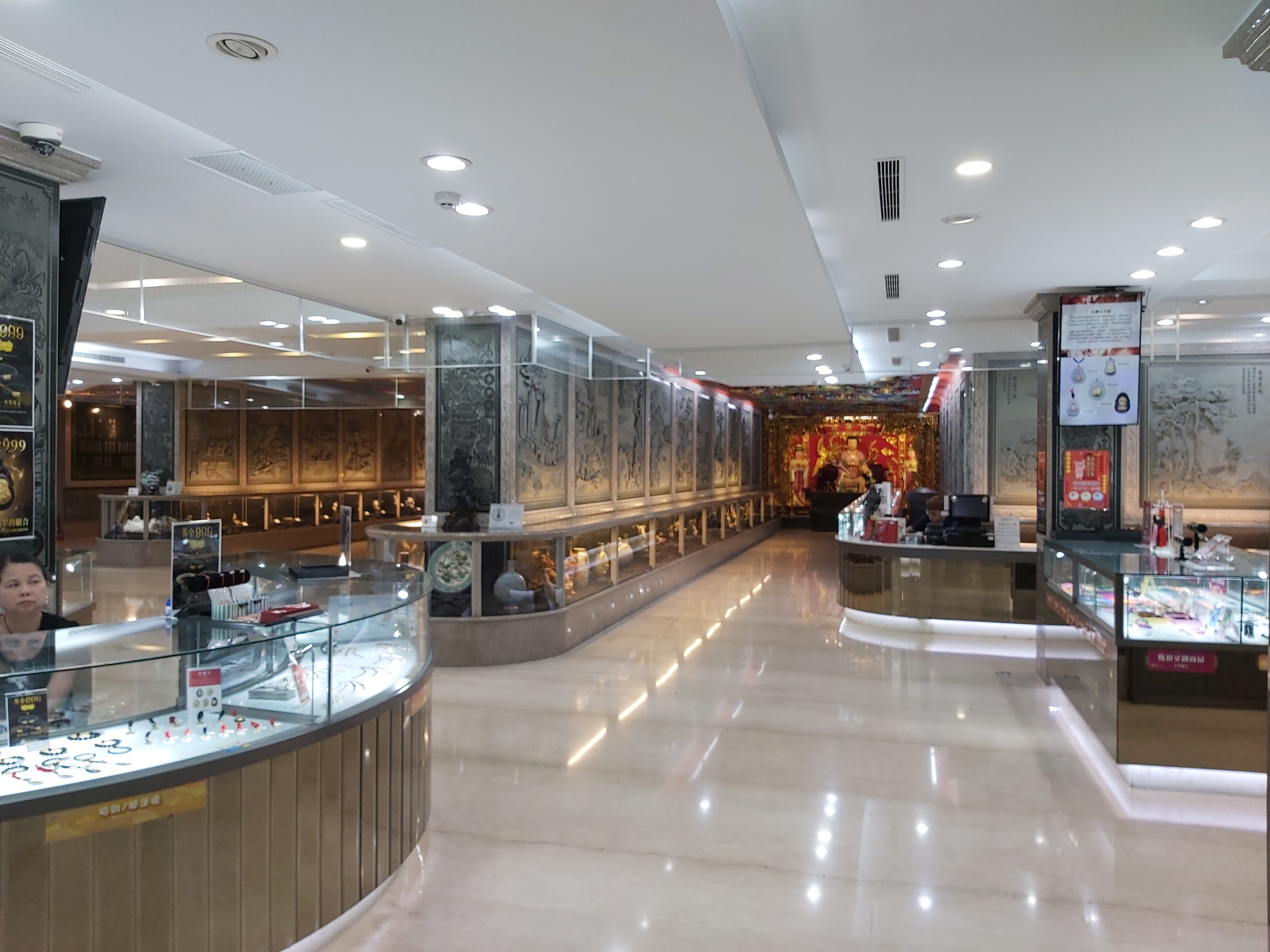
Cultural and Creative Arts Center

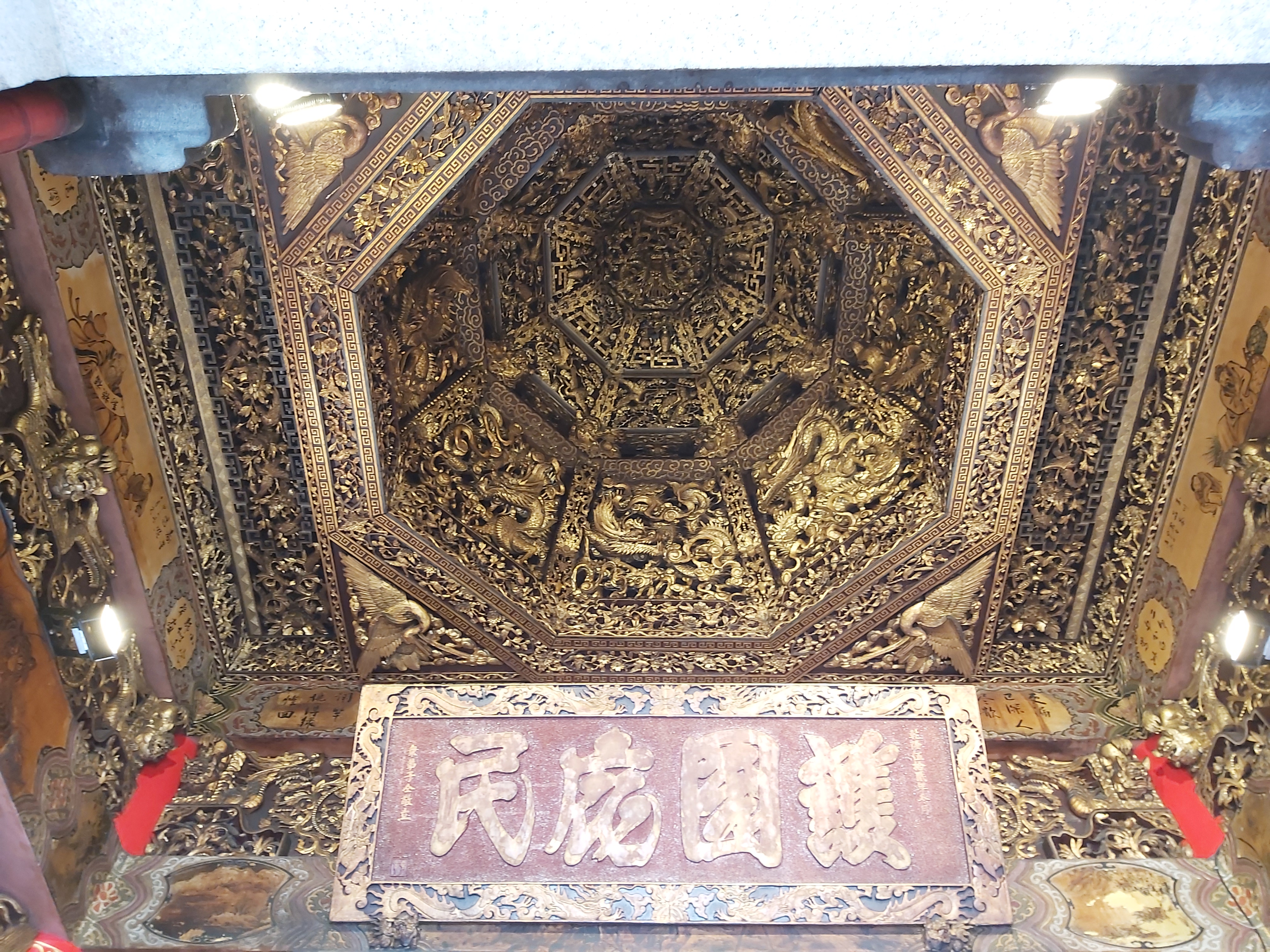
Ceiling

== Dajia Mazu Pilgrimage ==
The largest annual religious procession in Taiwan is organized by the Jenn Lann Temple in Taichung's Dajia District. The procession celebrates the birthday of the sea goddess Mazu and features the Mazu statue of the Jenn Lann Temple. Hundreds of thousands of pilgrims gather along the more than 340 kilometres route that extends through Taichung, as well as Changhua, Yunlin and Chiayi counties. The procession ends at Fongtian Temple in Xingang Chiayi.

== Taiwan Mazu Fellowship ==
The Dajia Temple organized in the late 1980s the first association of Mazu temples, called Taiwan Mazu Fellowship (台灣媽祖聯誼會). Its membership increased gradually from eighteen temples in 1990 to sixty temples in 2010. This is not the only association of Mazu temples in Taiwan, as it is rivaled by the Taiwan Golden Orchid Association of Temples (台灣寺廟金蘭會), which in 2010 included seventy temples (some of them not devoted to Mazu). According to scholar Hsun Chang, while some temples are affiliated to both associations, there are political differences in attitudes to both Mainland China (the Mazu Fellowship being more pro-Chinese) and local politics, the Fellowship favoring the Kuomintang and the Golden Orchid Association the Democratic Progressive Party.

== Transportation ==
The temple is accessible within walking distance west of Dajia Station of Taiwan Railway.

== See also ==
- Dajia Mazu Pilgrimage
- Qianliyan & Shunfeng'er
- List of Mazu temples around the world
- List of temples in Taiwan
- List of tourist attractions in Taiwan
