= Rinan railway station =

Railway station Taichung, Taiwan

Rinan Station 日南車站
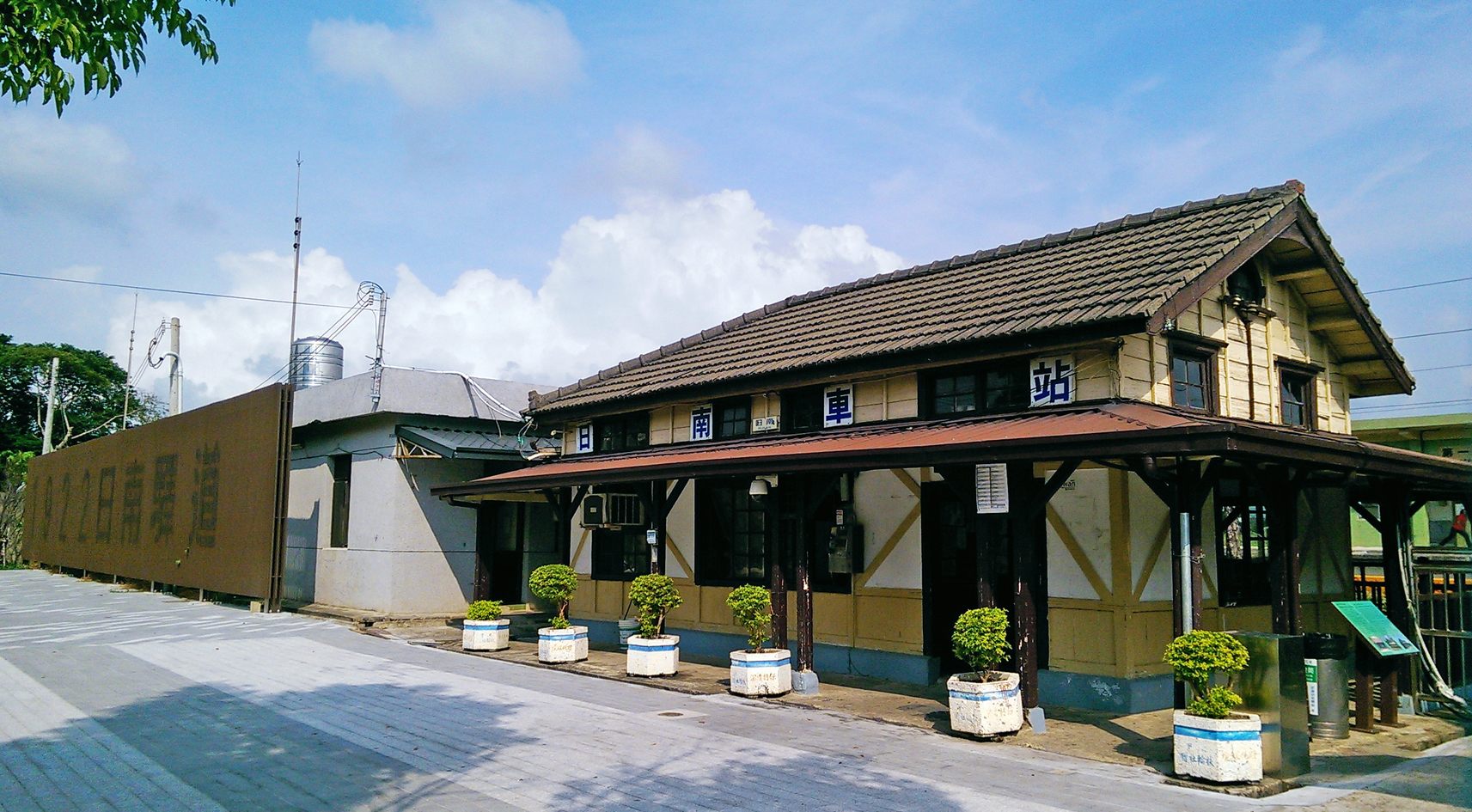

General information
- Location: Dajia, Taichung, Taiwan
- Coordinates: 24°22′40.0″N 120°39′16.0″E
- System: Train station
- Owner: Taiwan Railway Corporation
- Operator: Taiwan Railway Corporation
- Line: Western Trunk line
- Train operators: Taiwan Railway Corporation

History
- Opened: 11 October 1922

Passengers
- 668 daily (2024)
Location

Rinan (Chinese: 日南車站; Hanyu Pinyin: Rìnán Chēzhàn; Tongyong Pinyin: Rìhnán Chejhàn) is a railway station on the Taiwan Railway West Coast line (Coastal line) located in Dajia District, Taichung, Taiwan.

== History ==
The station was opened on 11 October 1922.

== Structure ==
This is one of five surviving examples of wooden structured stations on the Coastal line in Taiwan.

== See also ==
- List of railway stations in Taiwan

Preceding station	Taiwan Railway	Following station
Yuanli towards Keelung	Western Trunk line	Dajia towards Pingtung
