= Dajia District =

District in Taichung, Taiwan

Coordinates: 24.347116°N 120.622519°E

Dajia 大甲區 Tāi-kah, Taikō
- District
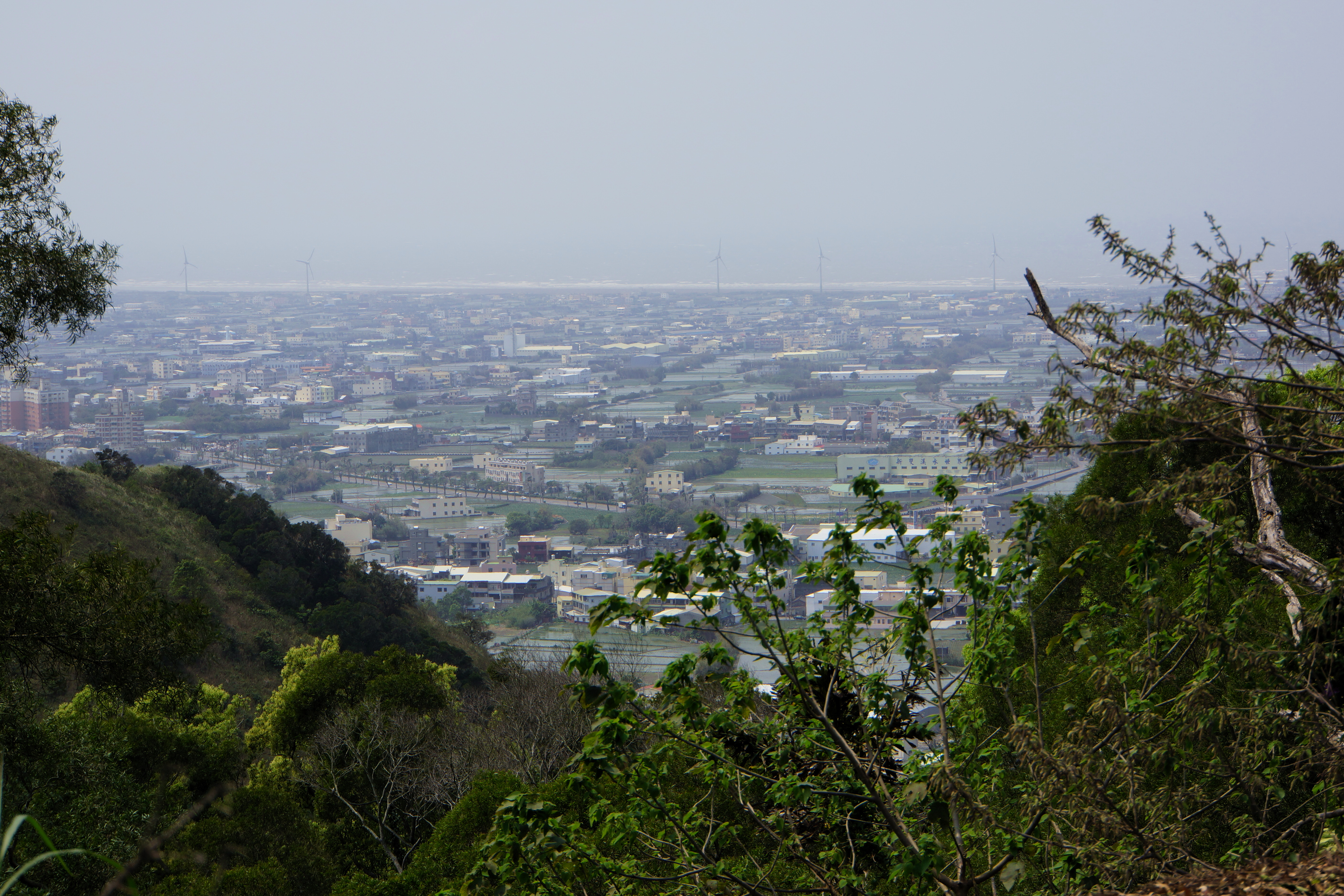

- Dajia District in Taichung City
- Location: Taichung, Taiwan

Area
  - Total: 59 km^{2} (23 sq mi)

Population (February 2023)
  - Total: 74,904
  - Density: 1,300/km^{2} (3,300/sq mi)
- Website: www.dajia.taichung.gov.tw (in Chinese)

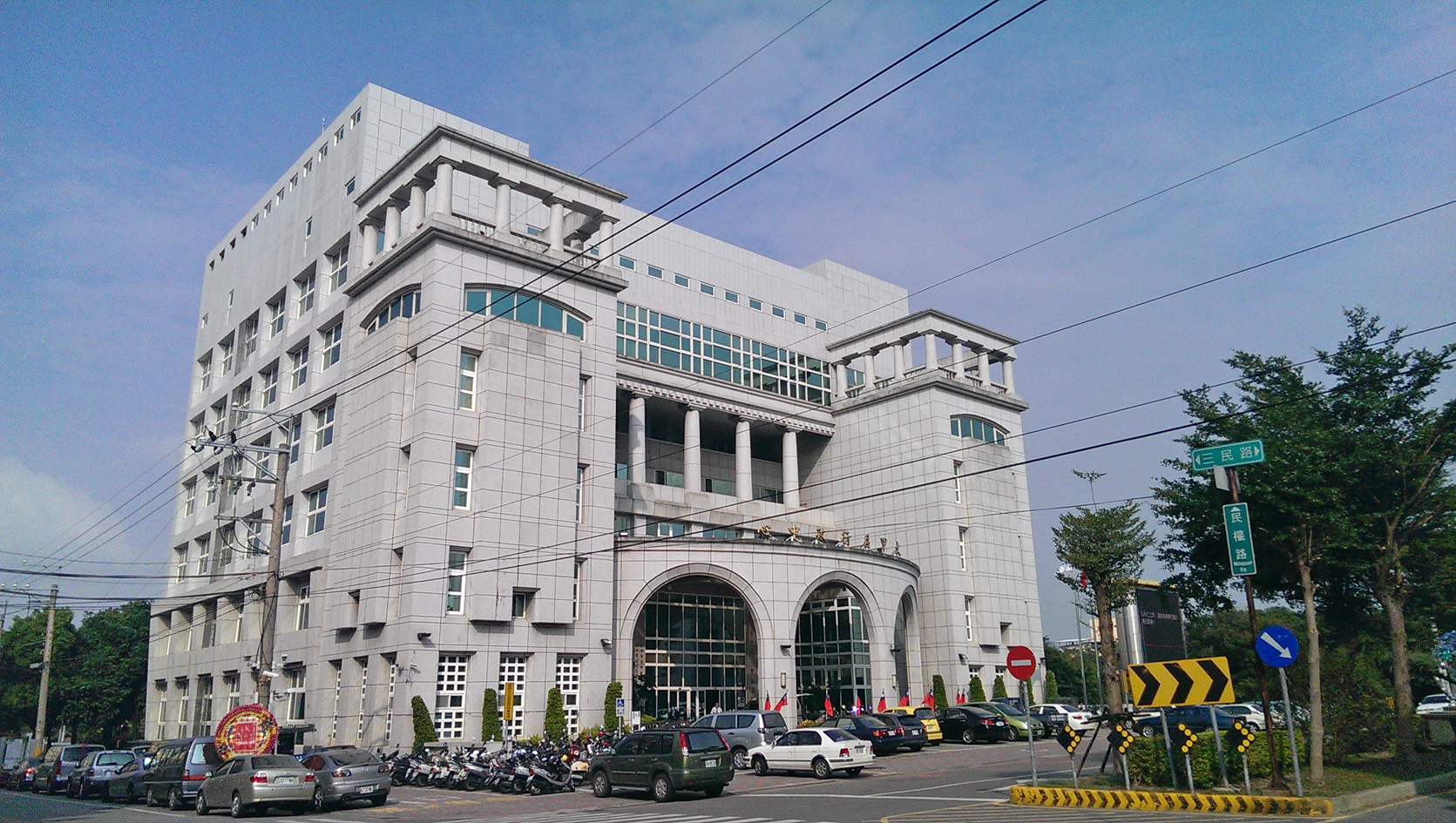
Dajia District office

Dajia District (Chinese: 大甲區; pinyin: Dàjiǎ Qū; Pe̍h-ōe-jī: Tāi-kah-khu) is a coastal suburban district in Taichung, Taiwan. It is located on the northwestern corner of Taichung. The climate of the region is Sub-tropical, and the average temperature is roughly 24 degrees Celsius. In March 2012, it was named one of the Top 10 Small Tourist Towns by the Tourism Bureau of Taiwan.

== History ==
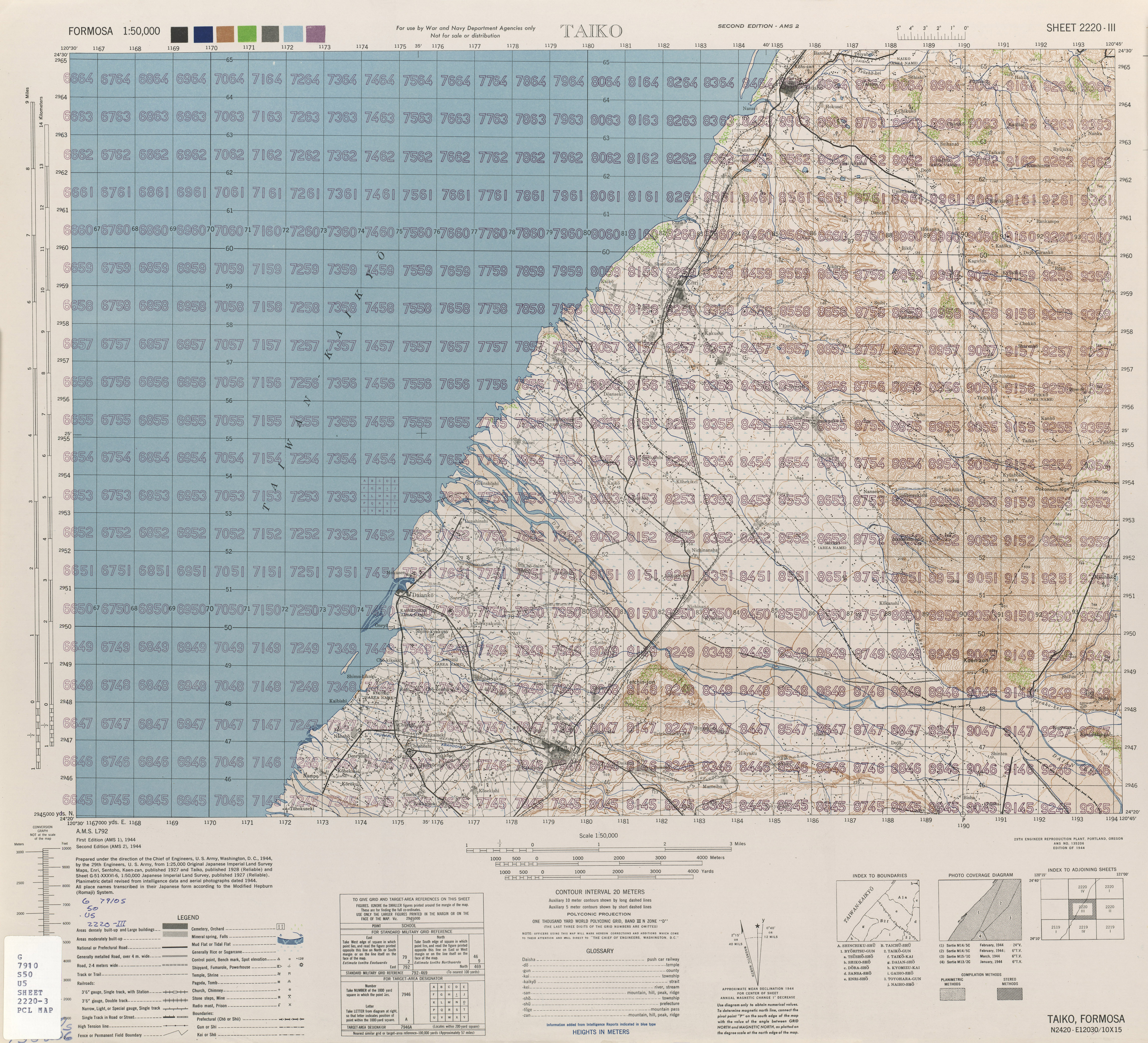
Map of Dajia (labeled as Taikō) and surrounding area (1944)

The local Taokas tribe people used to live in the area before the Han people arrived. Their main activities were hunting and farming. The Han Chinese started to arrive around 1669 during the Ming dynasty in which most of them came from Fujian, especially Quanzhou. Dajia used to be an urban township of Taichung County. On 25 December 2010, it was upgraded to become a district of the new special municipality of Taichung.

== Administrative divisions ==
Zhaoyang, Dajia, Shuntian, Kongmen, Pingan, Zhuangmei, Xinmei, Minshan, Zhongshan, Nanyang, Xunfeng, Yihe, Wuling, Wenqu, Wuqu, Wenwu, Fenghua, Dehua, Jiangnan, Dingdian, Taibai, Mengchun, Xingfu, Rinan, Longquan, Xiqi, Tongan, Fude and Jianxing Village.

== Economy ==
=== Notable products ===
- Dajia East Pottery
- Yutou etc.
- Nǎiyóu sū bǐng (奶油酥餅) – A buttery flaky pastry with a thin round shape
- Purple jade su – a taro dessert

=== Native products ===
- Rice
- Taro
- Scallion
- Sweet potato
- Bitter melon
- Straw hats and products

=== Industrial products ===
- Bicycle-Giant Manufacturing is Established 1972 in Dajia

== Tourist attractions ==
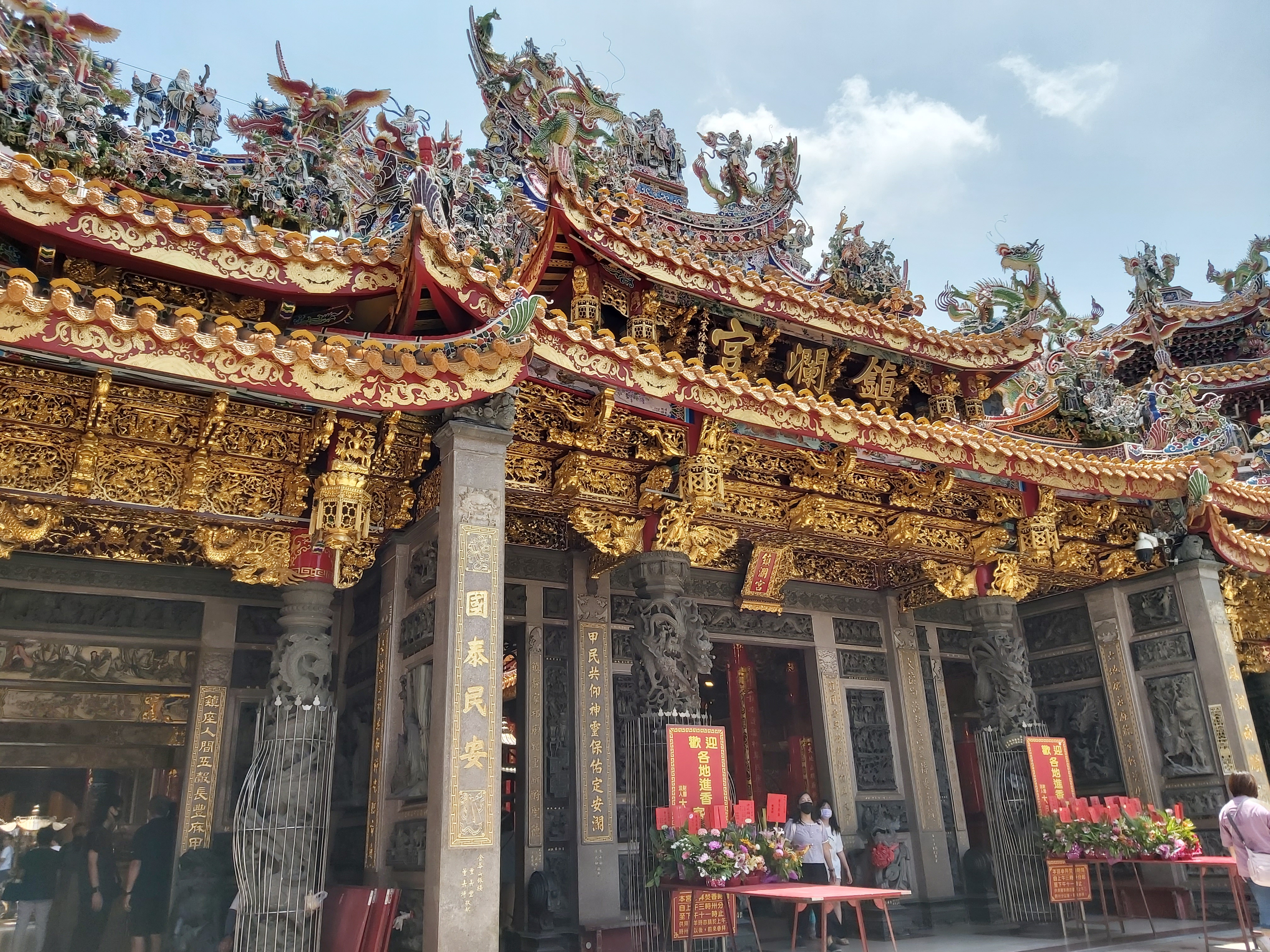
Dajia Jenn Lann Temple

- Dajia Jenn Lann Temple
- Sword Well
- Chenggong Park
- Dajia Wenchang Temple
- Kuo Xing Temple
- Military Memorial Park
- Zhongzheng Park

Dajia Mazu Sightseeing Cultural Festival, Taichung A religious and pompous event – Dajia Mazu border-tour of incense-offering

In the spring, there is the event of welcoming and receiving Mazu. A statue of Mazu is carried in a sedan chair through towns. There are also processions of performers, and god-welcoming competitions are held.

Among these events to welcome Mazu, held in every locality, is the border-tour of incense-offering of "Dajia, Taichung Mazu Sightseeing Cultural Festival." The tour would travel across the city and village of the former Taichung County (now part of Taichung City), Changhua County, Yunlin County, and Chiayi County and is considered to be one of the major events of Taiwan's religious community. As a whole, the tour would march a distance on foot of 330 kilometers, and lasts over 7 days and 8 nights, passing by more than eighty participating temples. During the border-tour of incense-offering, both the traditional folk arts as well as new-generation artistic performance of Taiwan join in the tour for joy, attracting a great deal of attention.

In recent years, the festival is increasingly attracting the growing number of Mazu worshippers in mainland China – in 2010 there were more than 2,000 mainland followers from about 40 Mazu temples. President Ma Ying-jeou also attended.

== Transportation ==
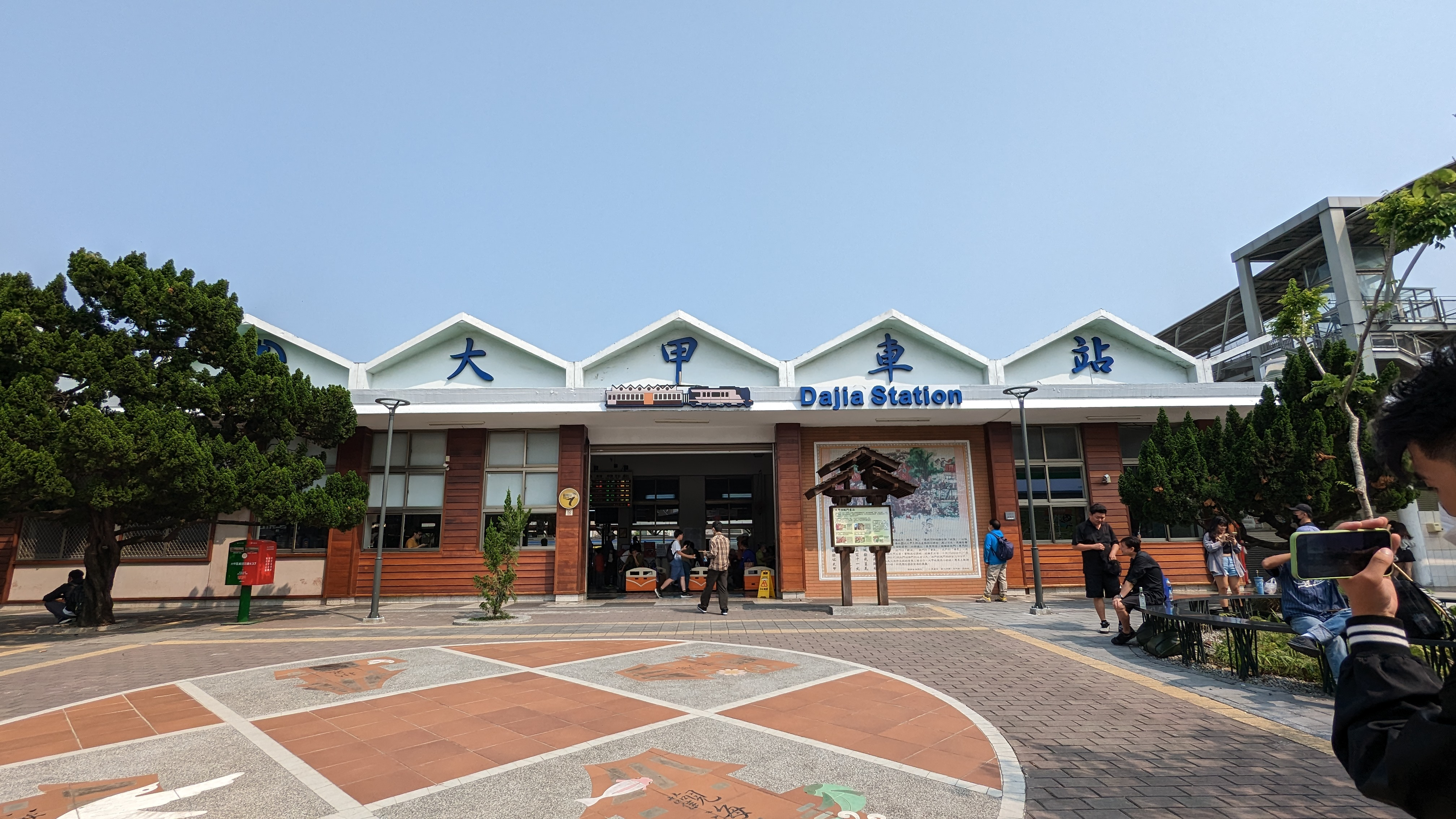
Dajia Rail Station

- TR Dajia Station
- TR Rinan Station

Taiwan High Speed Rail passes through the eastern part of the district, but no station is currently planned.

== Notable natives ==
- Chiu Tai-san, Minister of Justice (2016–2018)
- Hsueh Ling, member of 8th Legislative Yuan
- Liu Sung-pan, Vice President of Legislative Yuan (1990–1991)
- Peng Ming-min, presidential candidate for 1996 presidential election
- Huang Poren

== Climate ==
Climate data for Dajia District (2012–2023 normals and extremes)
Month	Jan	Feb	Mar	Apr	May	Jun	Jul	Aug	Sep	Oct	Nov	Dec	Year
Record high °C (°F)	30.3 (86.5)	33.7 (92.7)	33.1 (91.6)	33.3 (91.9)	38.8 (101.8)	37.1 (98.8)	40.4 (104.7)	38.3 (100.9)	39.2 (102.6)	37.6 (99.7)	34.4 (93.9)	31.0 (87.8)	40.4 (104.7)
Mean daily maximum °C (°F)	20.5 (68.9)	20.8 (69.4)	23.9 (75.0)	27.2 (81.0)	30.2 (86.4)	32.4 (90.3)	33.7 (92.7)	32.7 (90.9)	32.4 (90.3)	29.8 (85.6)	26.8 (80.2)	22.0 (71.6)	27.7 (81.9)
Daily mean °C (°F)	16.0 (60.8)	16.1 (61.0)	18.9 (66.0)	22.5 (72.5)	25.9 (78.6)	28.2 (82.8)	29.0 (84.2)	28.3 (82.9)	27.5 (81.5)	24.7 (76.5)	21.9 (71.4)	17.7 (63.9)	23.1 (73.5)
Mean daily minimum °C (°F)	12.8 (55.0)	13.0 (55.4)	14.6 (58.3)	19.1 (66.4)	22.7 (72.9)	25.2 (77.4)	25.8 (78.4)	25.2 (77.4)	24.2 (75.6)	21.4 (70.5)	18.5 (65.3)	14.7 (58.5)	19.8 (67.6)
Record low °C (°F)	2.9 (37.2)	6.0 (42.8)	8.7 (47.7)	10.7 (51.3)	12.6 (54.7)	21.7 (71.1)	21.4 (70.5)	22.0 (71.6)	17.8 (64.0)	14.3 (57.7)	7.2 (45.0)	6.9 (44.4)	2.9 (37.2)
Average precipitation mm (inches)	47.8 (1.88)	43.0 (1.69)	92.8 (3.65)	109.8 (4.32)	284.7 (11.21)	246.8 (9.72)	157.5 (6.20)	330.7 (13.02)	65.0 (2.56)	13.9 (0.55)	28.5 (1.12)	40.5 (1.59)	1,461 (57.51)
Average precipitation days	5.6	7.2	9.6	10.0	10.4	11.6	8.5	11.5	5.3	2.5	3.4	4.8	90.4
Average relative humidity (%)	82.7	84.6	83.9	82.1	85.7	85.3	82.9	86.6	83.6	78.2	80.7	79.9	83.0
Source 1: Central Weather Administration
Source 2: Atmospheric Science Research and Application Databank (precipitation days and humidity 2000–2023)

== See also ==
- Dajia River
