= Liu Chi-hsiang Art Gallery and Memorial Hall =

Art gallery and memorial hall in Liuying, Tainan, Taiwan

- 劉啟祥美術紀念館
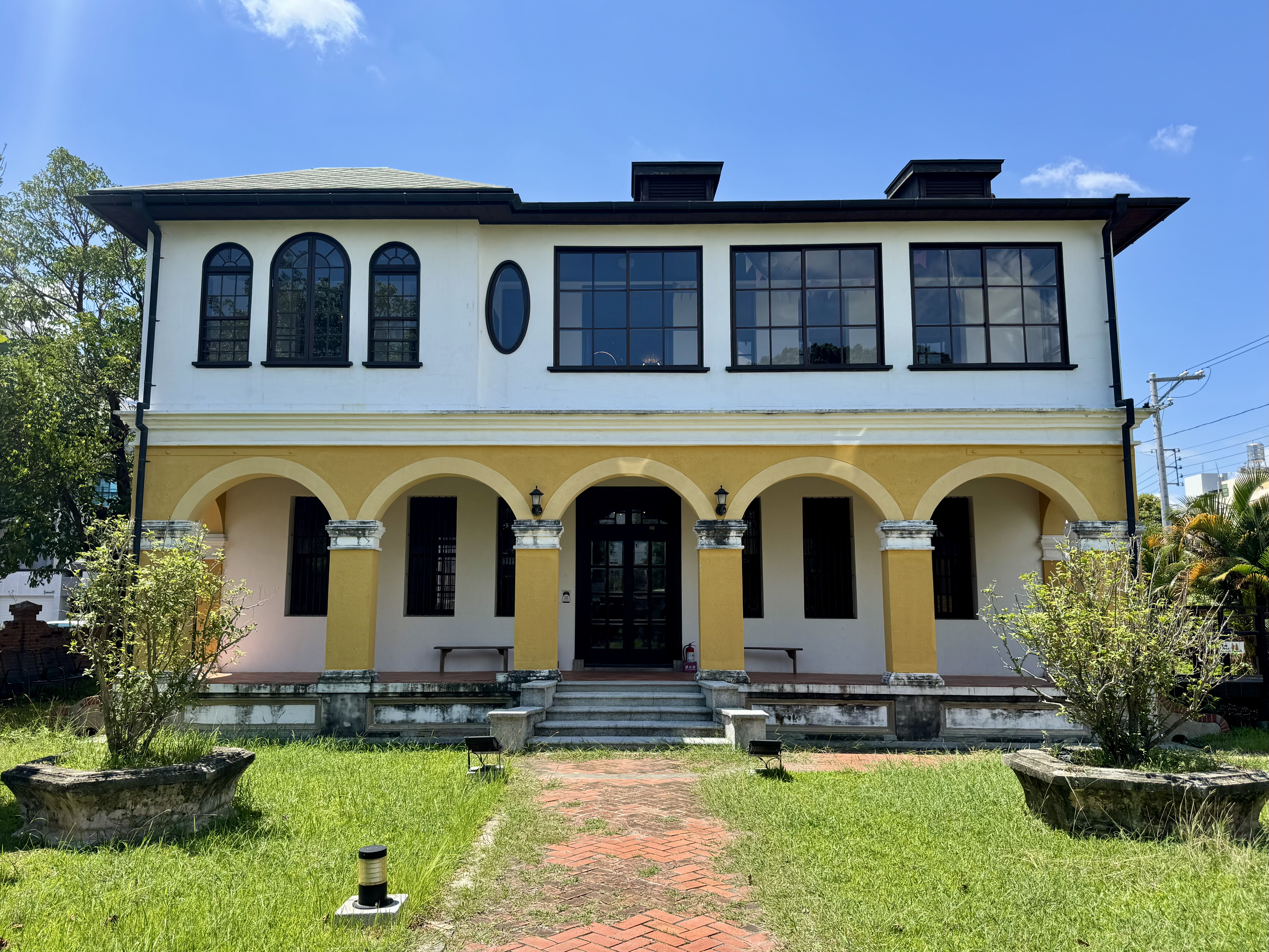
- Interactive map of the Liu Chi-hsiang Art Gallery and Memorial Hall area

General information
- Type: art gallery, memorial hall
- Location: Liouying, Tainan, Taiwan
- Coordinates: 23°16′38.0″N 120°18′37.0″E
- Opened: 2018

Technical details
- Floor count: 2

The Liu Chi-hsiang Art Gallery and Memorial Hall (traditional Chinese: 劉啟祥美術紀念館; simplified Chinese: 刘启祥美术纪念馆; pinyin: Liúqǐxiáng Měishù Jìniàn Guǎn; Pe̍h-ōe-jī: Lâu Khé-siông Bí-su̍t Kì-liām-koán) is an art gallery and memorial hall in Liouying District, Tainan, Taiwan.

== History ==
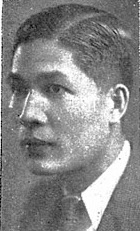
Liu Chi-hsiang

The art gallery and memorial hall building used to be the house of Liu Chi-hsiang, a local painter. It was later abandoned for several years. The building was renovated extensively by the Cultural Affairs Bureau of Tainan City Government over two years at a cost of NT$23 million. It was finally opened to the public in late 2018.

== Architecture ==
The art gallery and memorial hall is housed in a 2-story building. It also features a coffee shop house in a single-story building in front of the art gallery and memorial hall building. The building used to be Liu's studio.

== Transportation ==
The building is accessible within walking distance west of Liuying Station of Taiwan Railway.

== See also ==
- List of museums in Taiwan
