= Lioujia District =

District in Tainan, Taiwan

Coordinates: 23.223995°N 120.377487°E

Lioujia 六甲區
- District
- Lioujia District
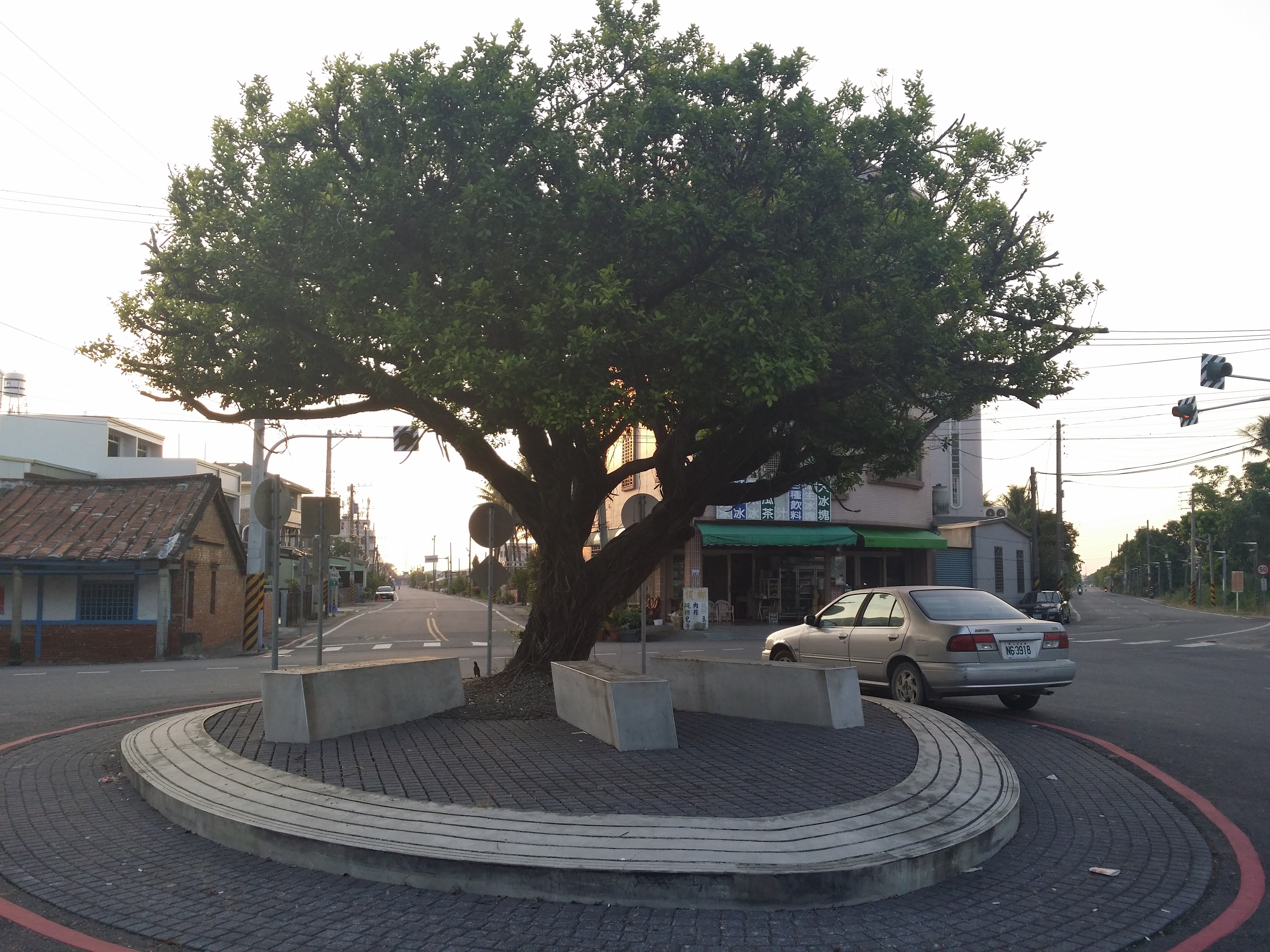

- 臺南市六甲區公所; Lioujia District Office, Tainan City

- Lioujia District in Tainan City
- Location: Tainan, Taiwan

Area
  - Total: 68 km^{2} (26 sq mi)

Population (May 2022)
  - Total: 21,392
  - Density: 310/km^{2} (810/sq mi)
- Website: lioujia.tainan.gov.tw/en (in English)

Lioujia District (Chinese: 六甲區; Hanyu Pinyin: Liùjiǎ Qū; Tongyong Pinyin: Liòujiǎ Cyu; Wade–Giles: Liu^{4}-chia^{3} Ch'ü^{1}; Pe̍h-ōe-jī: La̍k-kah-khu) is a rural district of about 21,392 residents in Tainan, Taiwan.

== History ==
After the handover of Taiwan from Japan to the Republic of China in 1945, Lioujia was organized as a rural township of Tainan County. On 25 December 2010, Tainan County was merged with Tainan City and Lioujia was upgraded to a district of the city.

== Geography ==
Lioujia District is bordered to the east by Nansi District; to the north by Liouying District and Dongshan District; to the south by Guantian District and Danei District, and to the west by Xiaying District.

== Administrative divisions ==
Liujia, Jiatung, Jianan, Longhu, Qijia, Erjia, Shuilin, Zhongshe, Guigang, Jingpu, Wangye and Daqiu Village.

== Tourist attractions ==
- Chishan Longhu Temple
- Nanyuan Recreationa Farm
- Shanhu Lake
- Siangong Temple
- World of Water Lilies
- Wushantou Reservoir
- Wushantou Prehistoric Remains

== Transportation ==
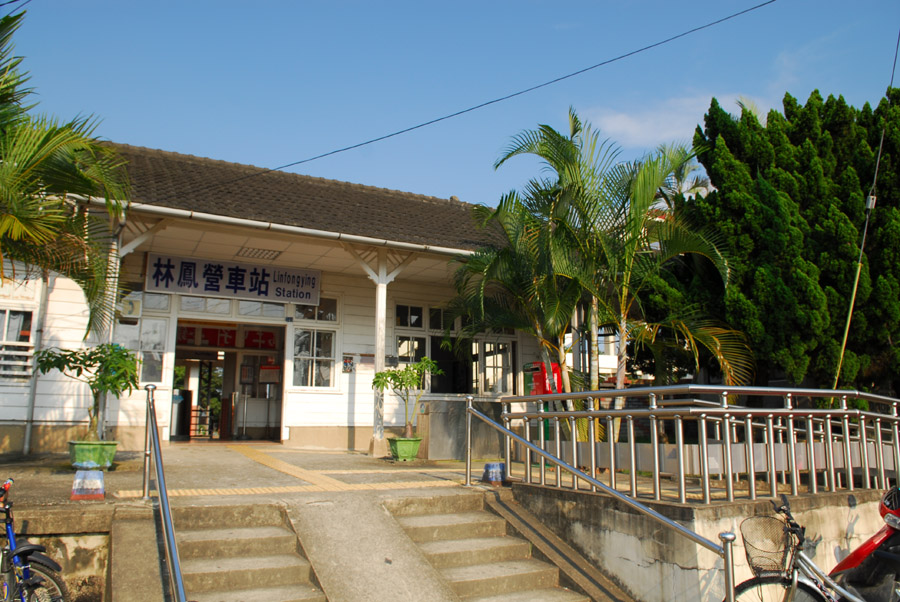
Linfengying Station

- TR Linfengying Station

== Notable natives ==
- Chen Yu-lin, football athlete.
- Tien Hung-mao, Chairman of Straits Exchange Foundation (2016–2018)
