= Jianshanpi Jiangnan Resort =

Resort in Liuying, Tainan, Taiwan

Jianshanpi Resort
- 台糖尖山埤渡假村
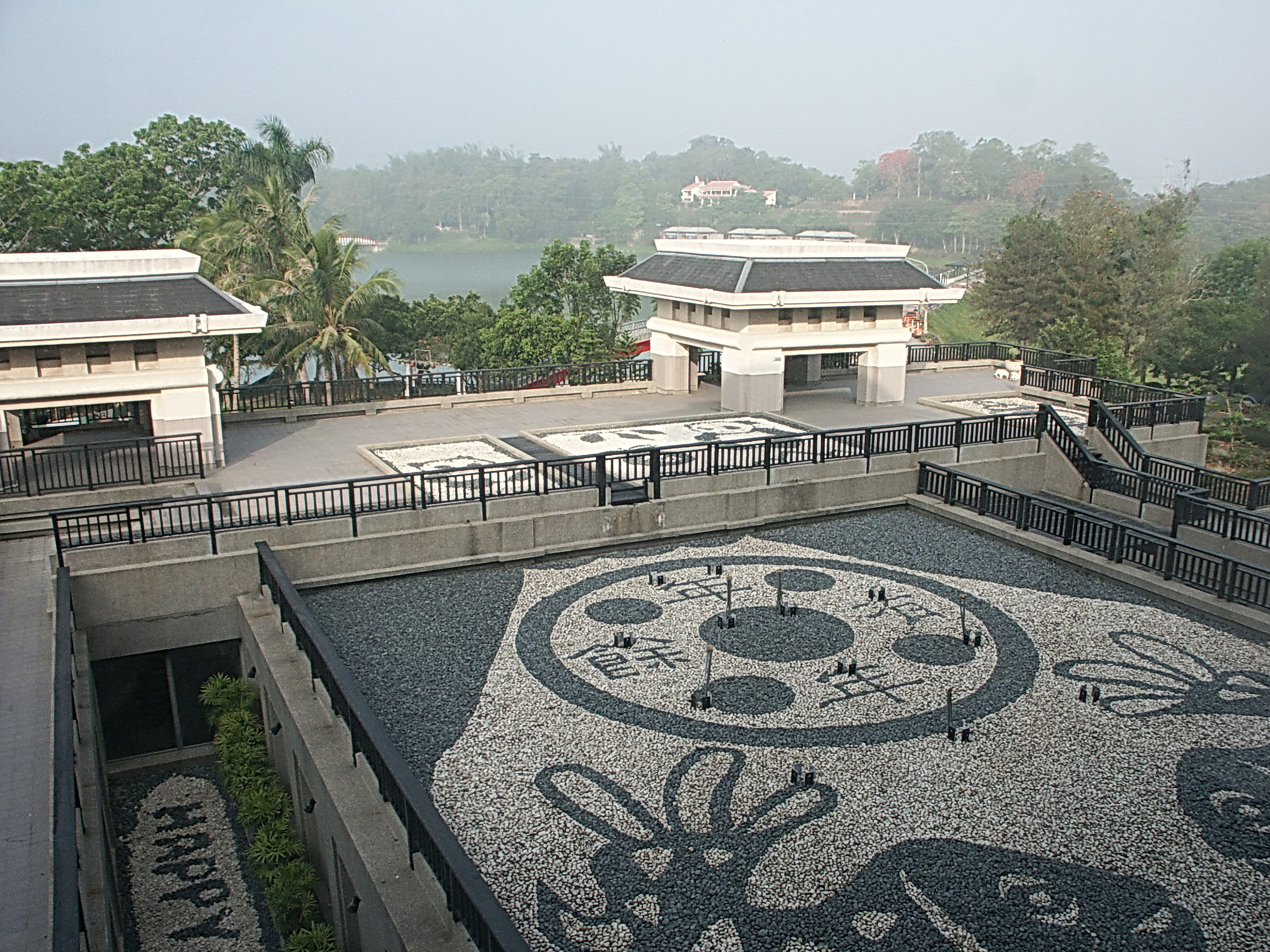
- Interactive map of the Jianshanpi Resort area

General information
- Type: resort
- Location: Liouying, Tainan, Taiwan
- Coordinates: 23°16′00.3″N 120°23′33.5″E

Website
- Official website (in Chinese)

The Jianshanpi Resort (Chinese: 尖山埤渡假村; pinyin: Jiānshānpí Dùjiàcūn) is a tourist attraction resort in Xushan Village, Liouying District, Tainan, Taiwan.

== History ==
The resort area was originally a 21-hectare reservoir operated by Taiwan Sugar Corporation. Due to persistent problem it has been facing on accumulating deposit, it was turned into a tourist resort.

== Architecture ==
The resort is located at the edge of a reservoir. The resort consists of Lake Touring Show Boat, Purple Bamboo Contemplation and Yuan Tsuei Chengsi Hall

== Transportation ==
The resort is accessible by taxi or bus from Chiayi Station of Taiwan High Speed Rail or by Sinying Transport Company bus from Tainan Station or Xinying Station of Taiwan Railway.

== See also ==
- List of tourist attractions in Taiwan
