= Deyuanpi Holland Village =

Resort in Liuying, Tainan, Taiwan

- 德元埤荷蘭村
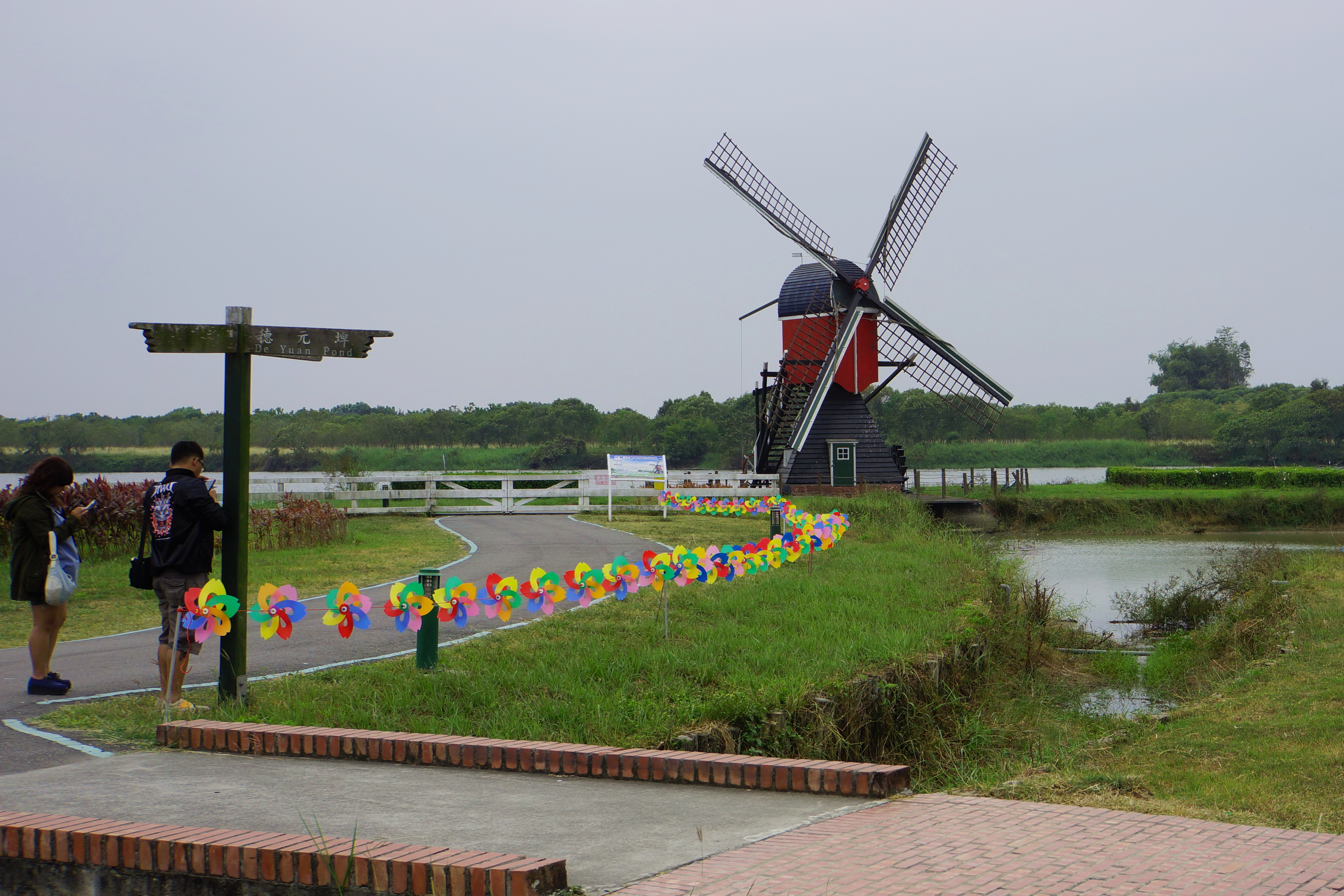
- Interactive map of the Deyuanpi Holland Village area

General information
- Architectural style: Dutch
- Location: Liouying, Tainan, Taiwan
- Coordinates: 23°15′50.5″N 120°20′23.8″E
- Inaugurated: 2010

Website
- Official website (in Chinese)

The Deyuanpi Holland Village (traditional Chinese: 德元埤荷蘭村; simplified Chinese: 德元埤荷兰村; pinyin: Déyuánpí Hélán Cūn) is a resort in Liouying District, Tainan, Taiwan.

== History ==
The idea of the village establishment was originally proposed by Tainan County Magistrate Su Huan-chih in 2002. The funds for the construction was given by Environmental Protection Administration, Tourism Bureau and Construction and Planning Agency. The village was opened in 2010.

== Architecture ==
The village was constructed with Dutch architecture in the vicinity of Deyuanpi Reservoir. It features dairy products shop, plaza, pastures and a Dutch windmill.

== Facilities ==
The village is equipped with ferry pier, camping and barbecue ground.

== Activities ==
The village is the center for various outdoor recreational activities. It also regularly holds various water sport events.

== See also ==
- List of tourist attractions in Taiwan
