= Linfengying railway station =

Railway station located in Tainan, Taiwan

Linfengying Station 林鳳營車站
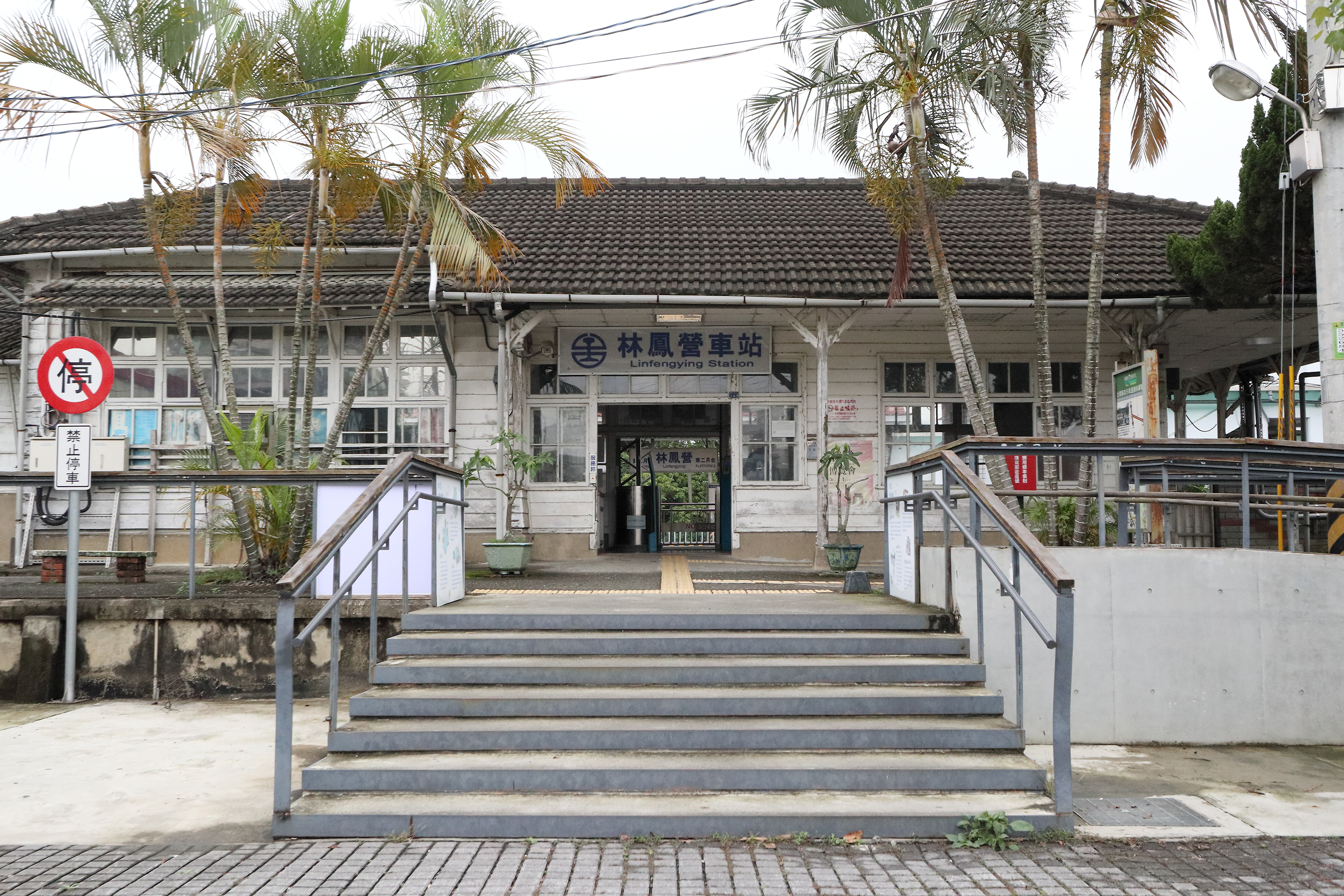

Chinese name
- Traditional Chinese: 林鳳營車站
Transcriptions
Standard Mandarin
- Hanyu Pinyin: Línfèngyíng Chēzhàn
- Bopomofo: ㄌㄧㄣ ㄈㄥˋ ㄧㄥˊ ㄔㄜ ㄓㄢˋ

General information
- Location: Lioujia, Tainan; Taiwan
- Coordinates: 23°14′33.2″N 120°19′15.8″E
- System: Taiwan Railway railway station
- Line: West Coast line
- Distance: 321.9 km to Keelung
- Platforms: 1 island platform 1 side platform

Construction
- Structure type: At-grade

Other information
- Station code: 169

History
- Opened: 16 December 1901

Passengers
- 2017: 215,021 per year
- Rank: 124

Services
Preceding station	Taiwan Railway	Following station
Liuying towards Keelung	Western Trunk line	Longtian towards Pingtung
Location

Linfengying railway station (Chinese: 林鳳營車站; pinyin: Línfèngyíng Chēzhàn) is a railway station located in Lioujia District, Tainan, Taiwan. It is located on the West Coast line and is operated by Taiwan Railway. (TR)

Linfengying Station’s old names were originally: Linfungying (1901-2003), and (2003-2009) Linfongying.
