= Bunka Gakuin =

Japanese vocational school

Coordinates: 35°41′59″N 139°45′39″E

Bunka Gakuin (文化学院) was a Japanese vocational school. It opened in 1921 as the first co-educational school in Japan.

== Alumni ==
- Hisae Imai
- Takako Irie
- Liu Chi-hsiang
- Yoko Mizuki
- Akiko Santo
- Akira Terao
- Mitsu Yashima
- Guan Zilan, Chinese painter
