= Liuying railway station =

Railway station in Liuying, Tainan, Taiwan

Liuying (Liouying) 柳營車站
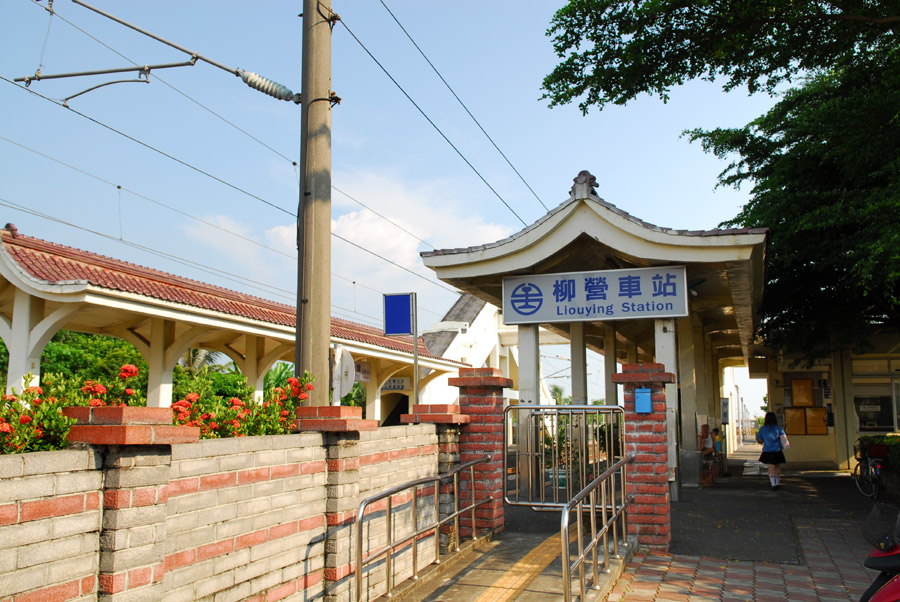

General information
- Location: Liouying, Tainan, Taiwan
- Coordinates: 23.277619°N 120.3225°E
- System: Railway station
- Owner: Taiwan Railway Corporation
- Operator: Taiwan Railway Corporation
- Line: West Coast
- Train operators: Taiwan Railway Corporation

History
- Opened: 1 June 1960
Location

Liuying (traditional Chinese: 柳營車站; simplified Chinese: 柳营车站; Hanyu Pinyin: Liǔyíng Chēzhàn; Tongyong Pinyin: Liǒuyíng Chejhàn) is a railway station of Taiwan Railway West Coast line in Liouying District, Tainan, Taiwan.

== History ==
The station was opened on 1 June 1960.

== Nearby stations ==
Taiwan Railway
Xinying ⇐ West Coast line ⇒ Linfengying

== Around the station ==
- Liu Chi-hsiang Art Gallery and Memorial Hall
- Liu Clan Shrine

== See also ==
- List of railway stations in Taiwan
