= Liu Chi-hsiang =

- 劉啟祥
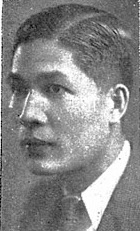
- Born: 3 February 1910; Tainan, Taiwan, Empire of Japan
- Died: 27 April 1998 (aged 88)
- Education: Bunka Gakuin
- Occupation: Painter

Liu Chi-hsiang (Chinese: 劉啟祥; pinyin: Liú Qǐxiáng; Pe̍h-ōe-jī: Lâu Khé-siông: Korean: (류)유지상; 3 February 1910 – 27 April 1998) was a Taiwanese painter. He was born in Ryūei, Tainan-chō, Japanese Taiwan (modern-day Liouying, Tainan, Taiwan). In 1923, Liu finished his Public School education and headed to Japan to study abroad in Aoyama Gakuin (青山学院). Liu was subsequently admitted into Kawabata gagakou (川端画学校), a private art school located in Tokyo.

Liu got into Bunka Gakuin to study art in 1928, and graduated from this college in 1931. He went to France later, and began to study painting by imitate some European oil paint works, especially the impressionism paintings. After his Europe travel, Liu received several art awards in Japan and Taiwan for his oil paint works, and got married in 1937. He lived in Japan until the World War II was end.

After the end of war, Liu returned to Taiwan, continued to work on his artistic creations. He moved to Kaohsiung in 1948. After the first wife's death, he married with his second wife in 1952. Liu spent his old age promoting the art education of Taiwan.

== Residence ==
Liu's former residence in Tainan has now turned into the Liu Chi-hsiang Art Gallery and Memorial Hall.

== See also ==
- Taiwanese art
