= Xinying Cultural Center =

Cultural center in Xinying, Tainan, Taiwan

- 新營文化中心
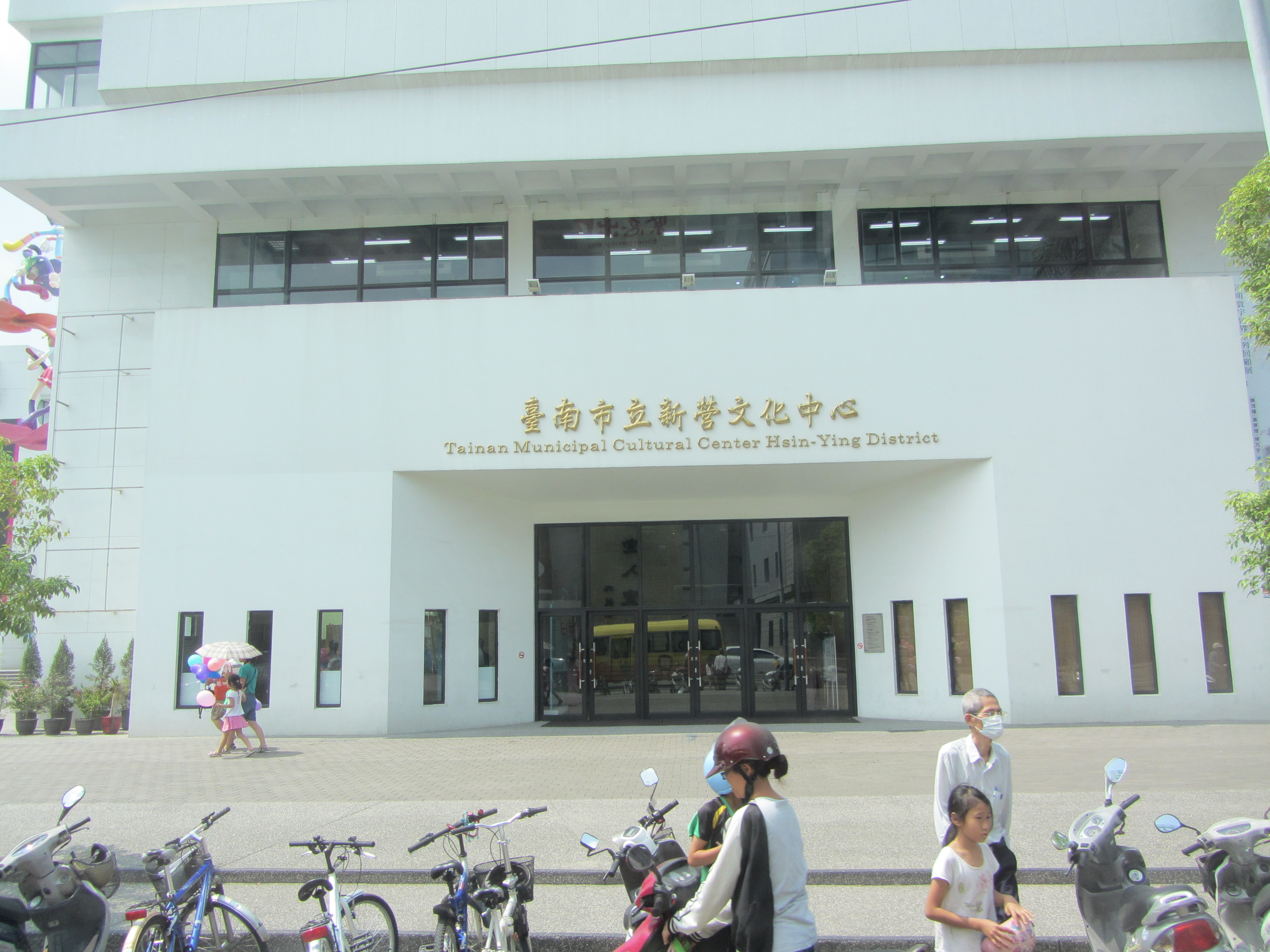
- Interactive map of the Xinying Cultural Center area
- Former names: Tainan County Cultural Center

General information
- Type: cultural center
- Location: Xinying, Tainan, Taiwan
- Coordinates: 23°18′30.4″N 120°18′57.5″E
- Opened: 8 October 1983
- Renovated: 2010

Website
- Official website

The Xinying Cultural Center (traditional Chinese: 新營文化中心; simplified Chinese: 新营文化中心; pinyin: Xīnyíng Wénhuà Zhōngxīn) is a cultural center in Xinying District, Tainan, Taiwan.

== History ==
The construction of the cultural center building began in 1981 and it was opened on 8 October 1983 as the Tainan County Cultural Center. On 12 August 1985, the interior facilities of the music hall began to be engineered and started to be used on 19 April 1986. In 2010, the center was entirely renovated and renamed Xinying Cultural Center. It was then officially reopened in June 2011.

== Architecture ==
- Artifact Display Room
- Gallery
- Cultural Activities Room
- Music Hall and Plaza
- Administration Office
- Auditorium

== Transportation ==
The cultural center is accessible within walking distance west from Xinying Station of Taiwan Railway.

== See also ==
- List of tourist attractions in Taiwan
