= Xinying District =

District in Tainan, Taiwan

Coordinates: 23°18′30″N 120°18′50″E

Xinying 新營區 Sinying
- District
- Xinying District

- Location in Tainan City
- Country: Republic of China (Taiwan)
- Municipality: Tainan
- Incorporated: 1981
- District: 2010

Area
  - Total: 38.5386 km^{2} (14.8798 sq mi)

Population (January 2023)
  - Total: 74,972
  - Density: 1,945.4/km^{2} (5,038.5/sq mi)
- Postal code: 730
- Website: xinying.tainan.gov.tw/en/

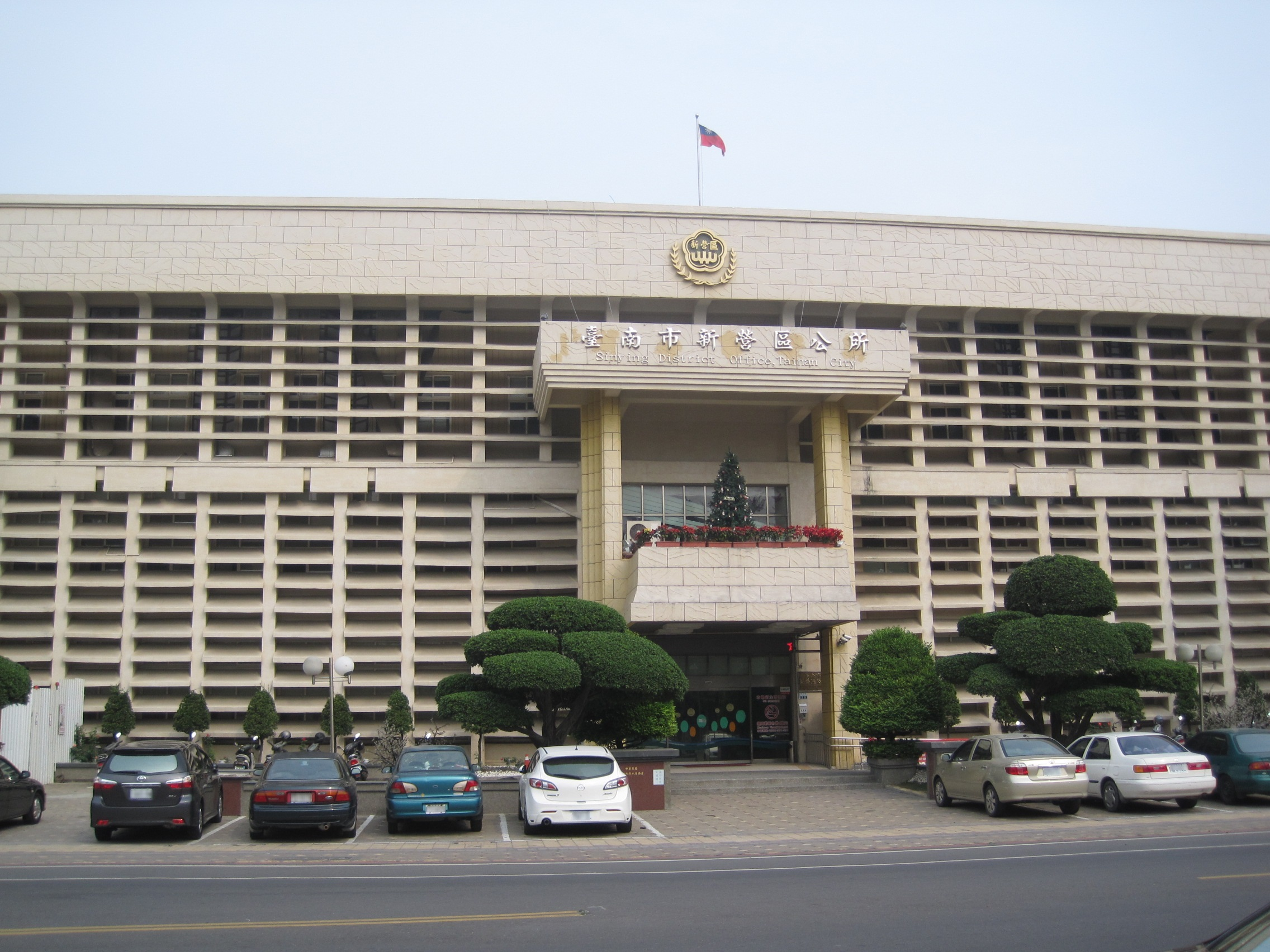
Sinying District Office, Tainan City

Xinying District (Chinese: 新營區; Hanyu Pinyin: Xīnyíng Qū; Tongyong Pinyin: Sinyíng Cyu; Wade–Giles: Hsin^{1}-ying^{2} ch'ü^{1}; Pe̍h-ōe-jī: Sin-iâⁿ-khu) or Sinying District is a district and the location of the second administrative center of the Tainan City Government in Taiwan. Sugar production was the most important industry in Xinying.

== History ==
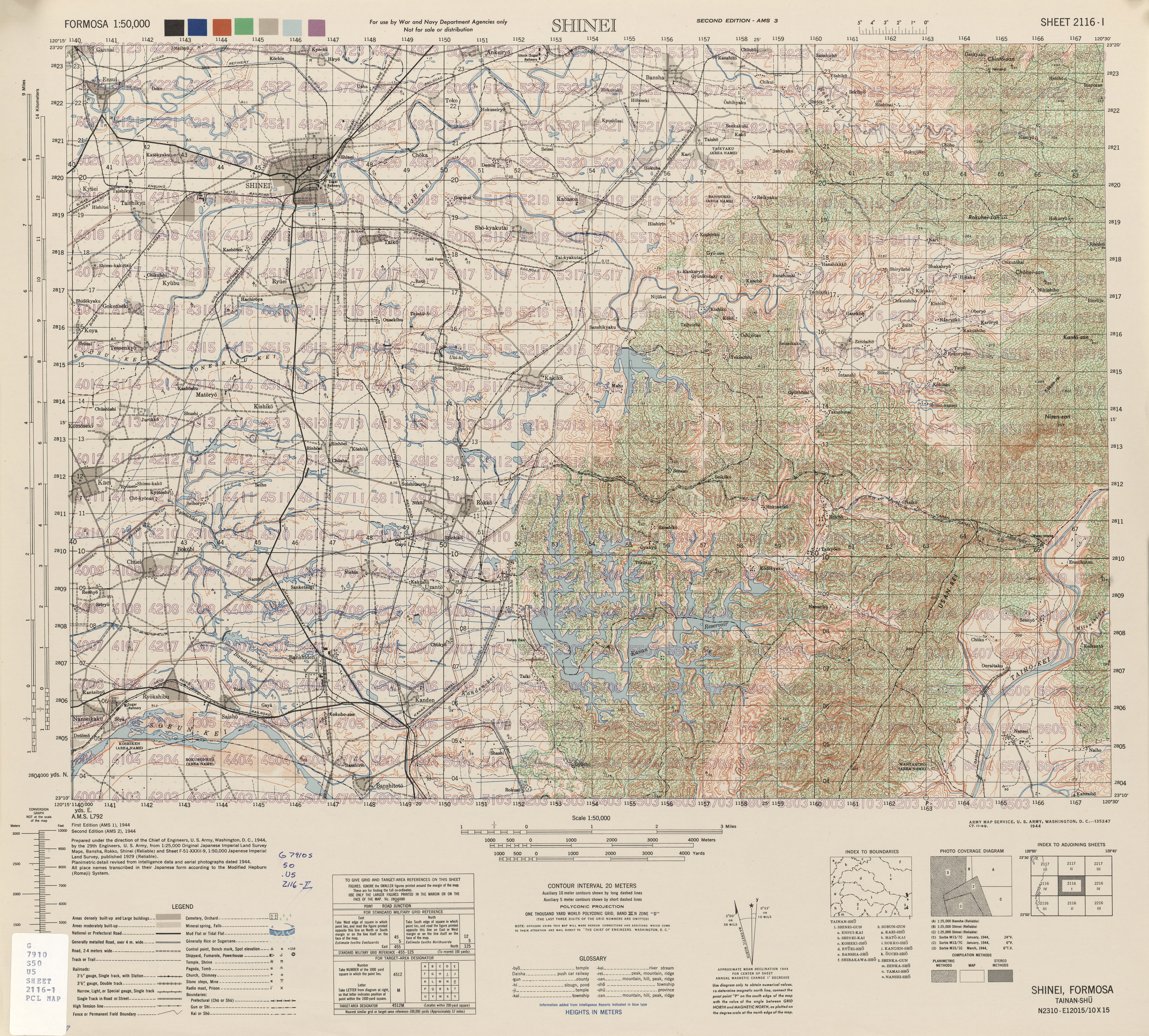
Map of Xinying (labeled as Shinei) and surrounding region (1944)

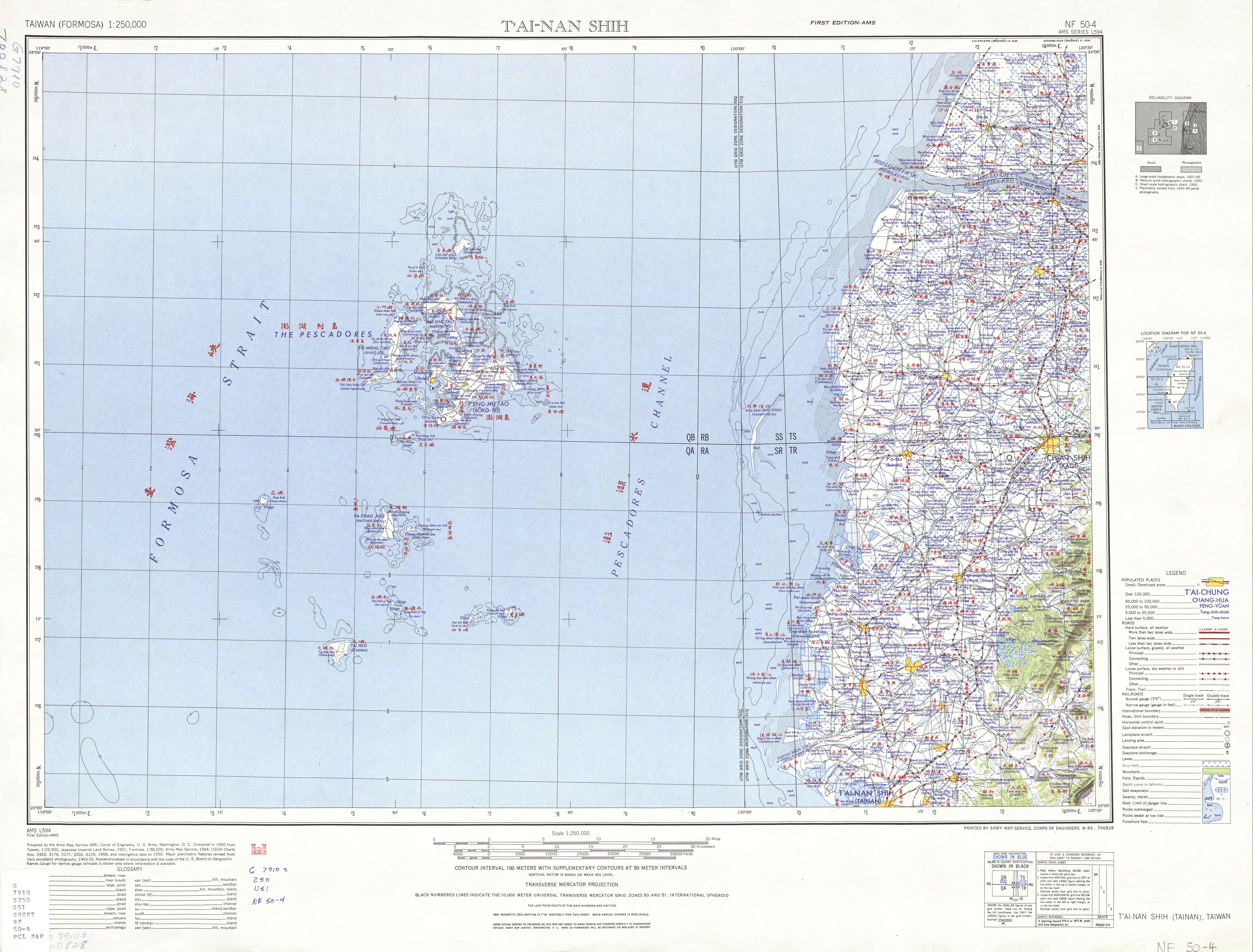
Map of Xinying (labeled as T'ai-nan-hsien (Tainan) (Shinei) 台南縣) and surrounding region (1950)

On 7 January 1946, Tainan County was established and Xinying Township was made its county capital. On 25 December 1981, Xinying was upgraded from an urban township to a county-administered city. After 25 December 2010, Tainan City merged with Tainan County to form a single special municipality, subsequently Xinying City became Xinying District and became the capital of Tainan City along with Anping District.

== Geography ==
Located in the northern portion of Tainan, Xinying has a tropical monsoon climate and is known for its many snacks and traditions.

== Administrative divisions ==
Name		Neighborhood count	Households count May 2013	Area (km^{2})	Population May 2013	Pop. density (person/km^{2})
Dahong Village	大宏里	31	1347	0.4633	3765	8126.48
Zhongzheng Village	忠政里	34	2088	0.4375	5764	13174.86
Minquan Village	民權里	24	1194	0.3252	3101	9535.67
Sanxian Village	三仙里	33	1245	0.4432	3478	7847.47
Minsheng Village	民生里	30	1399	0.4402	4015	9120.85
Xinbei Village	新北里	33	1836	0.8758	5396	6161.22
Xinnan Village	新南里	30	1860	1.0654	5389	5058.19
Minrong Village	民榮里	39	2027	0.7983	5378	6736.82
Haoping Village	好平里	14	370	0.0659	982	14901.37
Yanping Village	延平里	18	577	0.0704	1362	19346.59
Yongsheng Village	永生里	22	453	0.0825	1199	14533.33
Xing'an Village	興安里	15	199	0.8205	456	555.76
Xingye Village	興業里	22	728	0.1321	1798	13610.9
Nanxing Village	南興里	33	1180	0.5547	2967	5348.84
Zhongying Village	中營里	15	519	1.305	1485	1137.93
Wanggong Village	王公里	34	1711	0.4798	5199	10835.77
Xindong Village	新東里	28	2433	0.8758	7564	8636.68
Tuku Village	土庫里	18	576	3.2299	1820	563.49
Piliao Village	埤寮里	15	687	2.1071	2084	989.04
Huzhen Village	護鎮里	11	610	5.8811	1707	290.25
Jiafang Village	嘉芳里	15	696	2.256	2091	926.86
Nanzhi Village	南紙里	27	1483	1.8133	4338	2392.32
Taibei Village	太北里	21	693	1.8467	2034	1101.42
Tainan Village	太南里	20	690	1.2984	1775	1367.07
Jiubu Village	舊廍里	8	153	2.2737	364	160.09
Tiexian Village	鐵線里	14	333	2.9332	823	280.58
Jiaodai Village	角帶里	8	210	1.6528	518	313.41
Guye Village	姑爺里	12	258	2.4123	645	267.38
Wuxing Village	五興里	14	430	1.654	1125	680.17
Xinying District		638	27985	38.5386	78622	2040.08

== Government institutions ==
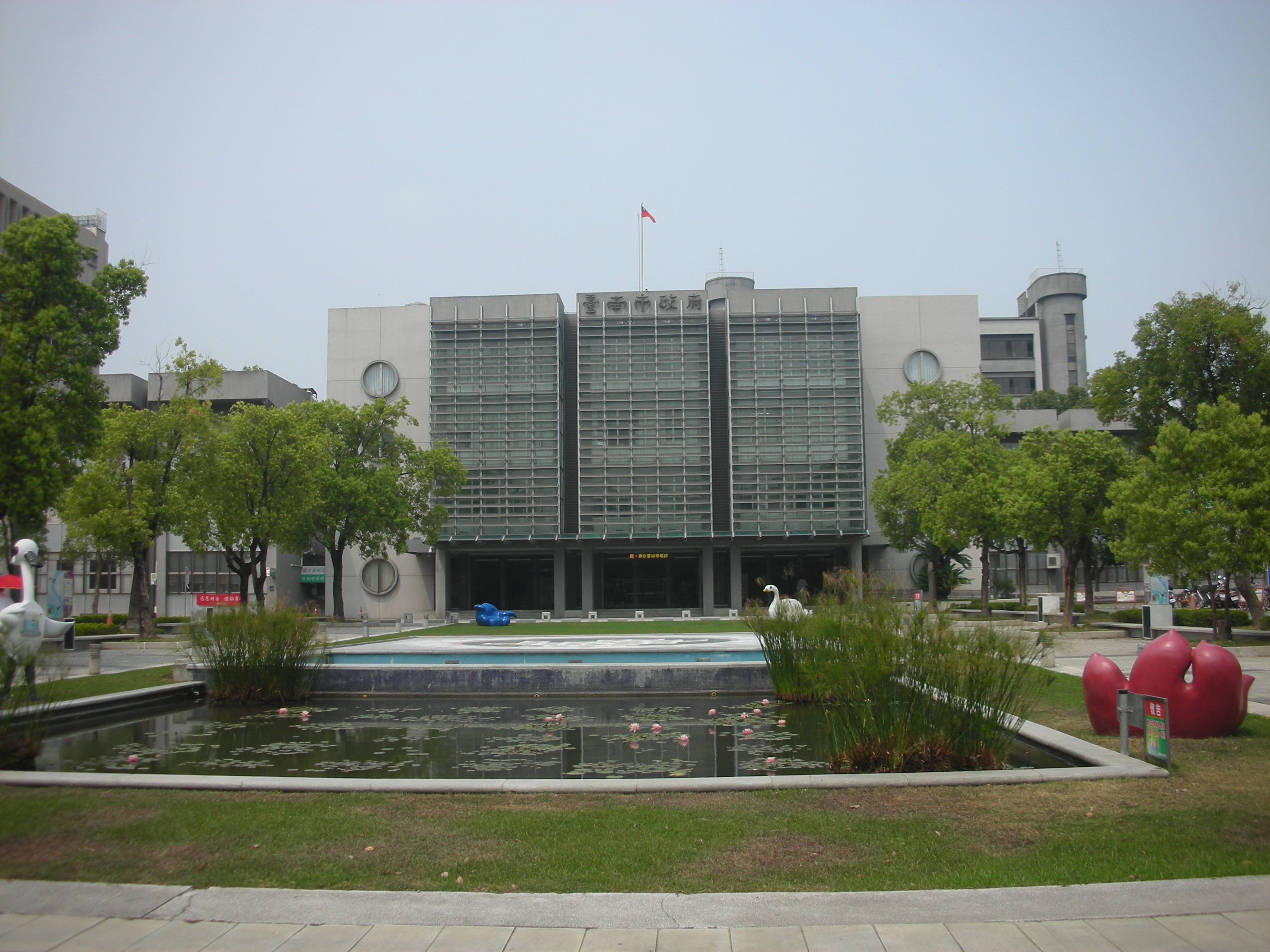
Tainan City Government

- Tainan City Government

== Education ==
=== Senior high schools ===
- National Xinying Senior High School (國立新營高級中學)
- National Xinying Industrial Professional School (國立新營高級工業職業學校)
- Tainan City Nan'guang Private Senior High School (臺南市私立南光高級中學)
- Tainan City Xingguo Private Senior High School (臺南市私立興國高級中學)
- Tainan City Yude Private Industrial Professional School (臺南市私立育德工業家事職業學校)

=== Junior high schools ===
- Tainan City Xindong Junior High School (臺南市立新東國民中學)
- Tainan City Taizi Junior High School (Taizi Palace) (臺南市立太子國民中學【太子宮】)
- Tainan City Nanxin Junior High School (臺南市立南新國民中學)

=== Primary schools ===
- Tainan City Xinying District Primary School (臺南市新營區新營國民小學)
- Tainan City Xinying District Tuku Primary School (臺南市新營區土庫國民小學)
- Tainan City Xinying District Gongcheng Primary School (臺南市新營區公誠國民小學)
- Tainan City Xinying District Nanzi Primary School (臺南市新營區南梓國民小學)
- Tainan City Xinying District Xinsheng Primary School (臺南市新營區新生國民小學)
- Tainan City Xinying District Xintai Primary School (臺南市新營區新泰國民小學)
- Tainan City Xinying District Xinjin Primary School (臺南市新營區新進國民小學)
- Tainan City Xinying District Xinqiao Primary School (Tiexian Bridge) (臺南市新營區新橋國民小學【鐵線橋】)
- Tainan City Xinying District Xinxing Primary School (臺南市新營區新興國民小學)
- Tainan City Xinying District Xinmin Primary School (臺南市新營區新民國民小學)

== Tourist attractions ==
- Nanying Green Heart Park
- Xinying Cultural Center
- Xinying Night Market
- Taiwan Sugar Corporation Xinying Factory
- Nanying Green Metropolitan Park (南瀛綠都心公園)
- Swan Lake Park (天鵝湖公園)
- Xinying Sugar Rail Bike Route (新營糖鐵自行車道)
- Changsheng Military Base Green Tunnel (長勝營區綠色隧道)
- Nanzhi Community Park
- New Art Park Camp

== Transportation ==
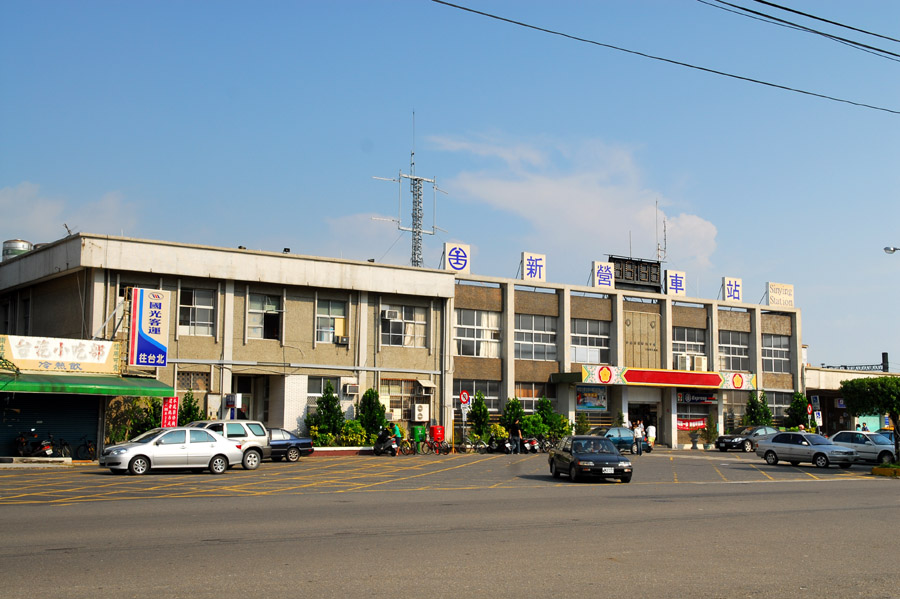
Xinying Station

Xinying is served by National Freeway 1 and Taiwan Railway Western Line (臺鐵西部幹線) Xinying Station. It is also served by Provincial Highway No. 1.

== See also ==
- Tainan
