= Liu Clan Shrine =

Ancestral shrine in Liuying, Tainan, Taiwan

- 劉家宗祠
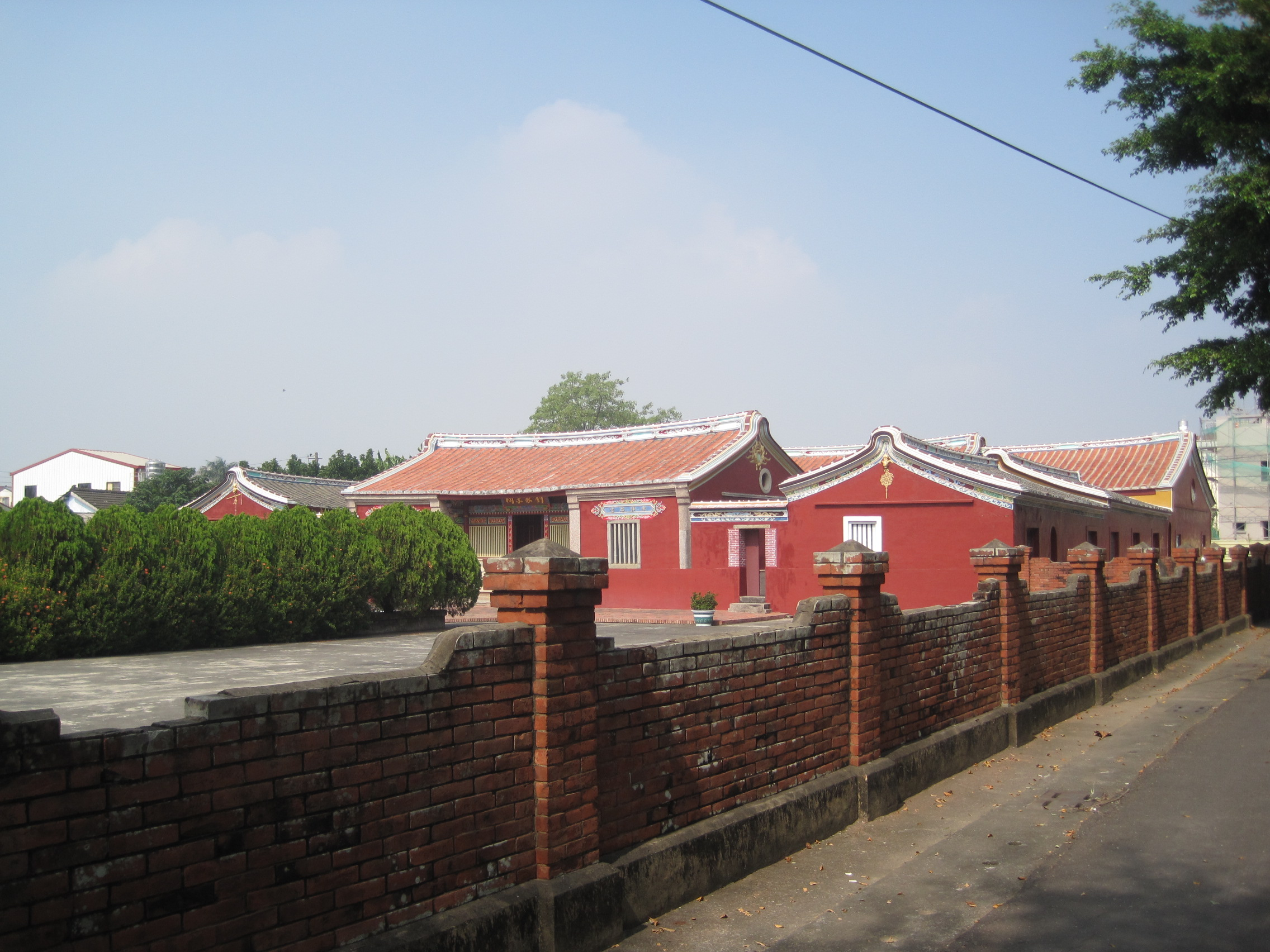
- Interactive map of the Liu Clan Shrine area

General information
- Type: ancestral shrine
- Location: Liouying, Tainan, Taiwan
- Coordinates: 23°16′37.9″N 120°18′35.6″E
- Construction started: 1867
- Completed: 1871

Technical details
- Floor count: 1
- Floor area: 2,644 m^{2}

The Liu Clan Shrine (traditional Chinese: 劉家宗祠; simplified Chinese: 刘家宗祠; pinyin: Liú Jiā Zōngcí) is an ancestral shrine in Liouying District, Tainan, Taiwan.

== History ==
The construction of the shrine started in 1867 and was completed in 1871.

== Architecture ==
The shrine is housed in a single-story building, with the whole complex spanning over an area of 2,644 m^{2}. Many of the materials used for the construction of the shrine were imported from Mainland China, excluding the roof tiles. The shrine consists of 16 rooms.

== Transportation ==
The building is accessible within walking distance west of Liuying Station of Taiwan Railway.

== See also ==
- Chinese ancestral veneration
- Beiji Temple
- Grand Matsu Temple
- Tainan Confucian Temple
- State Temple of the Martial God
- Temple of the Five Concubines
- List of temples in Taiwan
- List of tourist attractions in Taiwan
