= Liouying District =

District in Tainan, Taiwan

Coordinates: 23°16′42″N 120°19′03″E

Liouying 柳營區 Liuying, Liu-ying
- District
- Liouying District
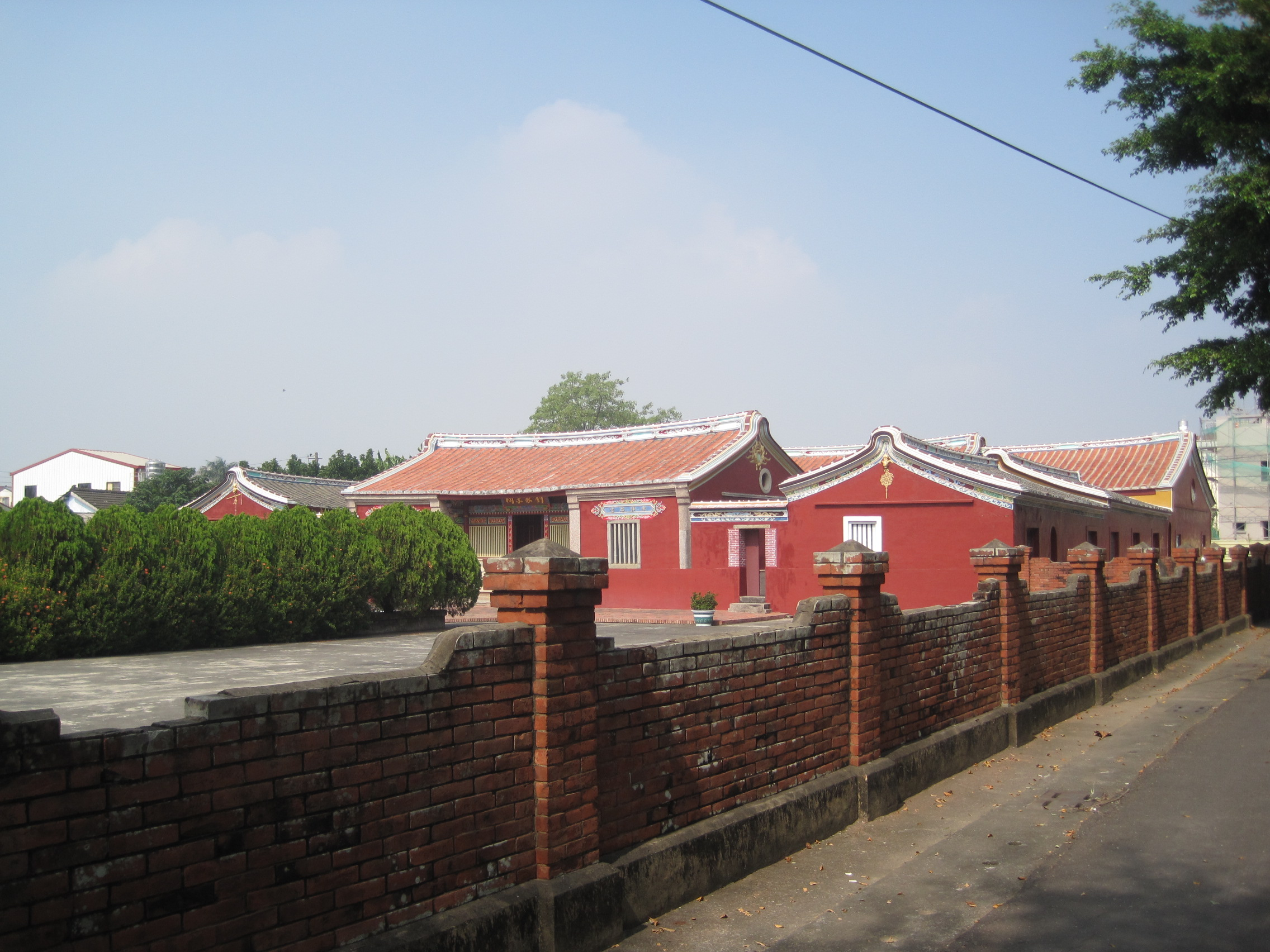

- 柳營區公所; Liouying District Office, Tainan City

- Liouying District in Tainan City
- Location: Tainan, Taiwan

Area
  - Total: 61 km^{2} (24 sq mi)

Population (May 2022)
  - Total: 20,503
  - Density: 340/km^{2} (870/sq mi)
- Website: liouying.tainan.gov.tw (in Chinese)

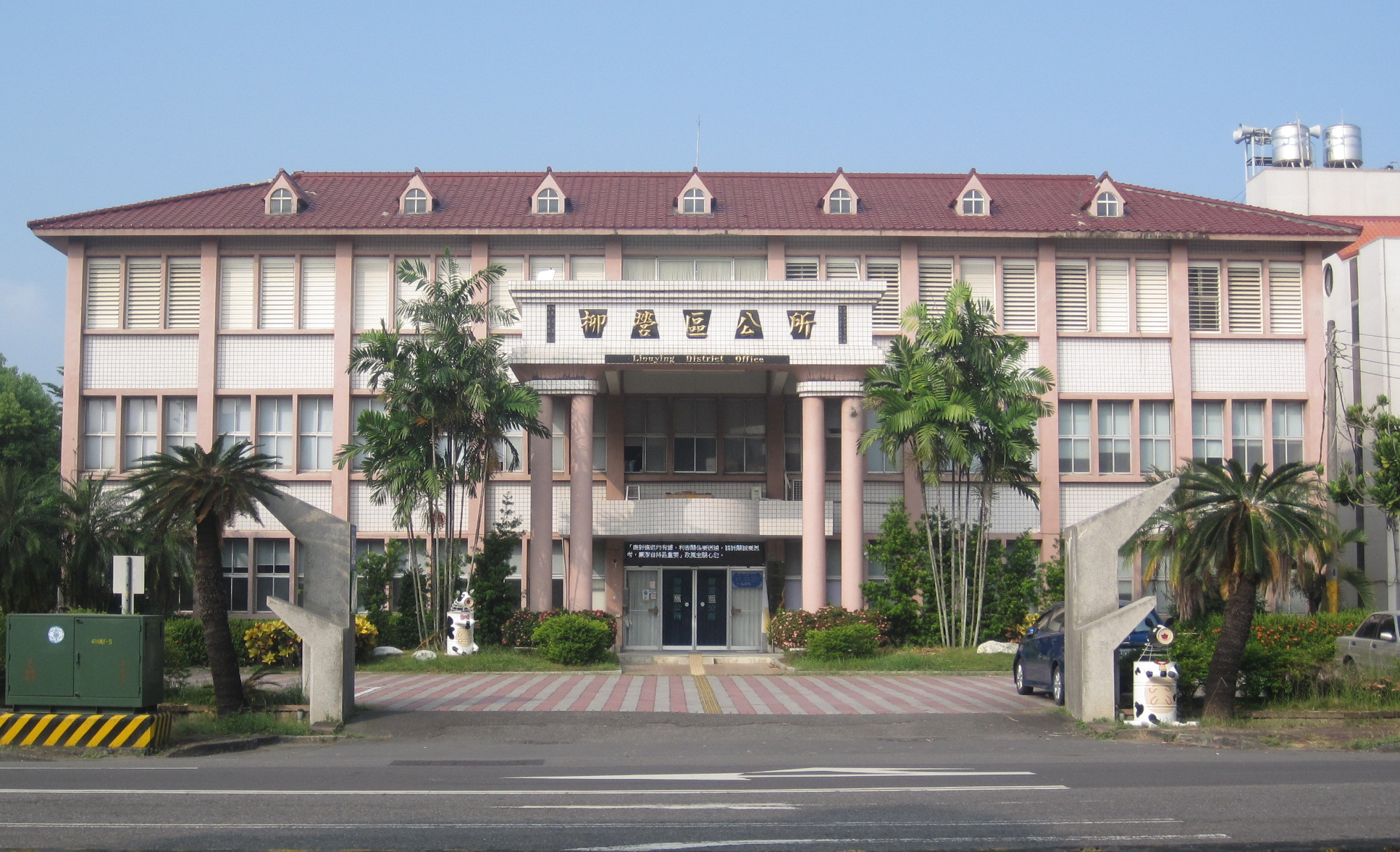
Liouying District Office

Liouying District (Chinese: 柳營區; Hanyu Pinyin: Liǔyíng Qū; Tongyong Pinyin: Liǒuyíng Cyu; Pe̍h-ōe-jī: Liú-iâⁿ-khu) is a rural district of about 20,503 residents in Tainan, Taiwan.

== History ==
After the handover of Taiwan from Japan to the Republic of China in 1945, Liouying was organized as a rural township of Tainan County. On 25 December 2010, Tainan County was merged with Tainan City and Liouying was upgraded to a district of the city.

== Administrative divisions ==
Shilin, Guangfu, Zhongcheng, Tungsheng, Baweng, Renhe, Taikang, Zhongxi, Dunong, Danong, Shennong, Guoyi and Xushan Village.

== Education ==
- Min-Hwei College of Health Care Management

== Tourist attractions ==
- Deyuanpi Holland Village
- Jianshanpi Jiangnan Resort
- Liu Chi-hsiang Art Gallery and Memorial Hall
- Liu Clan Shrine
- Foshan Guanyin Temple
- Jianshanpi Reservoir
- Liouying Daitian Temple
- Nanyuan Recreational Farm
- Taikang Green Tunnel

== Transportation ==
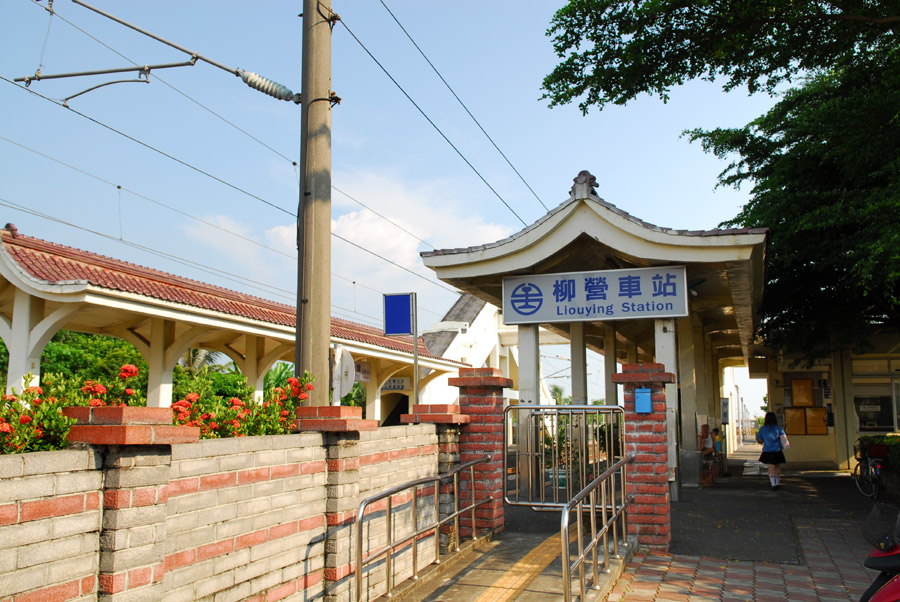
Liuying Station

- TR Liuying Station

== Notable natives ==
- Liu Chi-hsiang
