= Xinying railway station =

Railway station in Tainan, Taiwan

Coordinates: 23°18′23.3″N 120°19′23.3″E

Xinying 新營
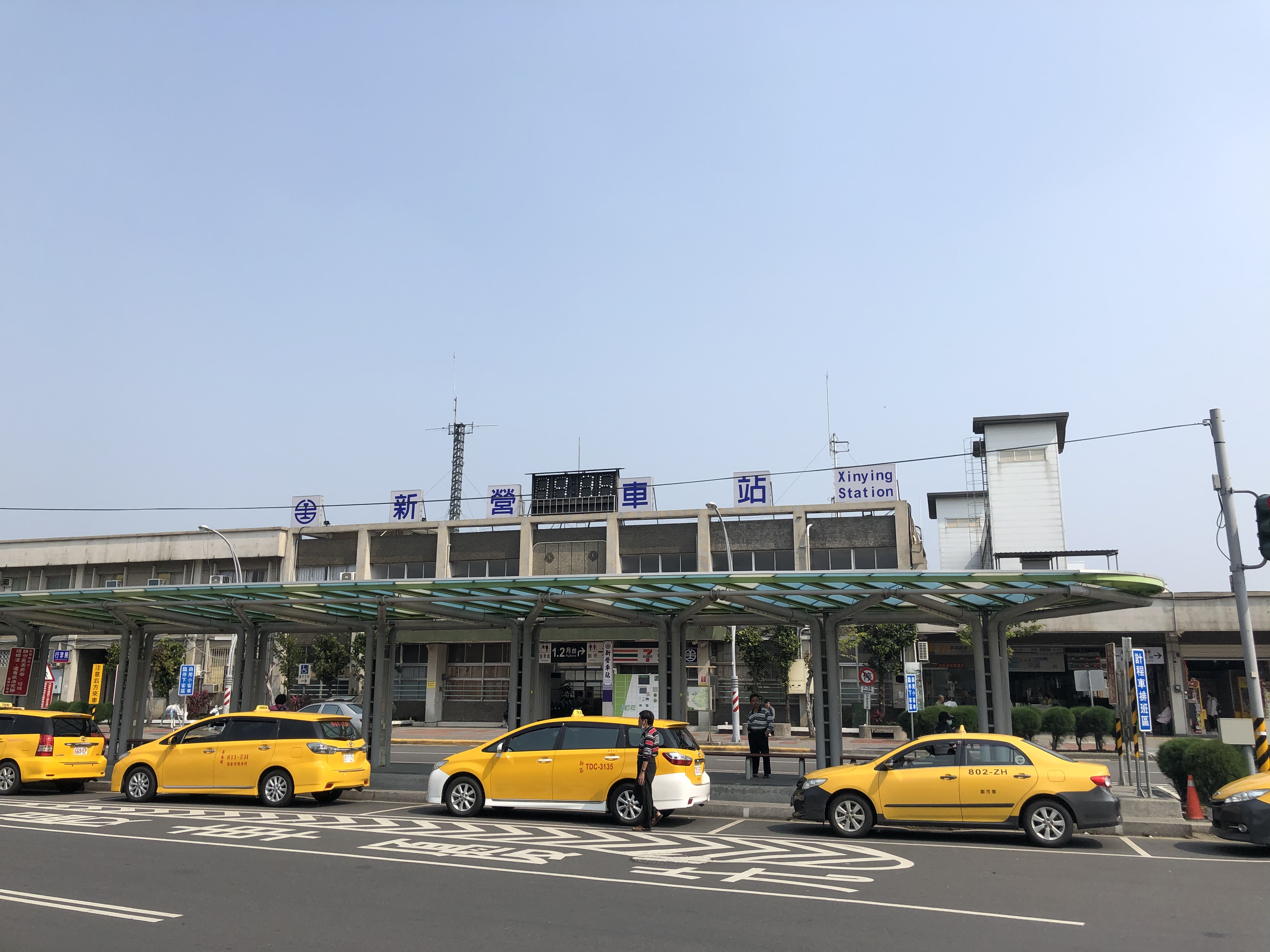

General information
- Location: Zhongshan Rd., No. 1 Xinying, Tainan; Taiwan
- Operated by: Taiwan Railway Corporation
- Line: Western Trunk line (167)
- Distance: 314.7 km from Keelung
- Connections: Bus stop

Construction
- Structure type: At-grade

Other information
- Classification: 一等站 (Taiwan Railways Administration level)

History
- Opened: 16 December 1901
- Rebuilt: 1976
- Previous names: 新營庄停車場, 新營驛

Key dates
- 1934: Station rebuilt
- 1964: Station rebuilt

Passengers
- 10,134 daily (2024)
Location

Xinying Station (Chinese: 新營車站; Hanyu Pinyin: Xīnyíng Chēzhàn; Tongyong Pinyin: Sinyíng Chejhàn), formerly transliterated as Hsinying Station until 2003 and Sinying from 2003 until 2009, is a railway station of Taiwan Railway West Coast line located in Xinying District, Tainan City, Taiwan.

== Overview ==
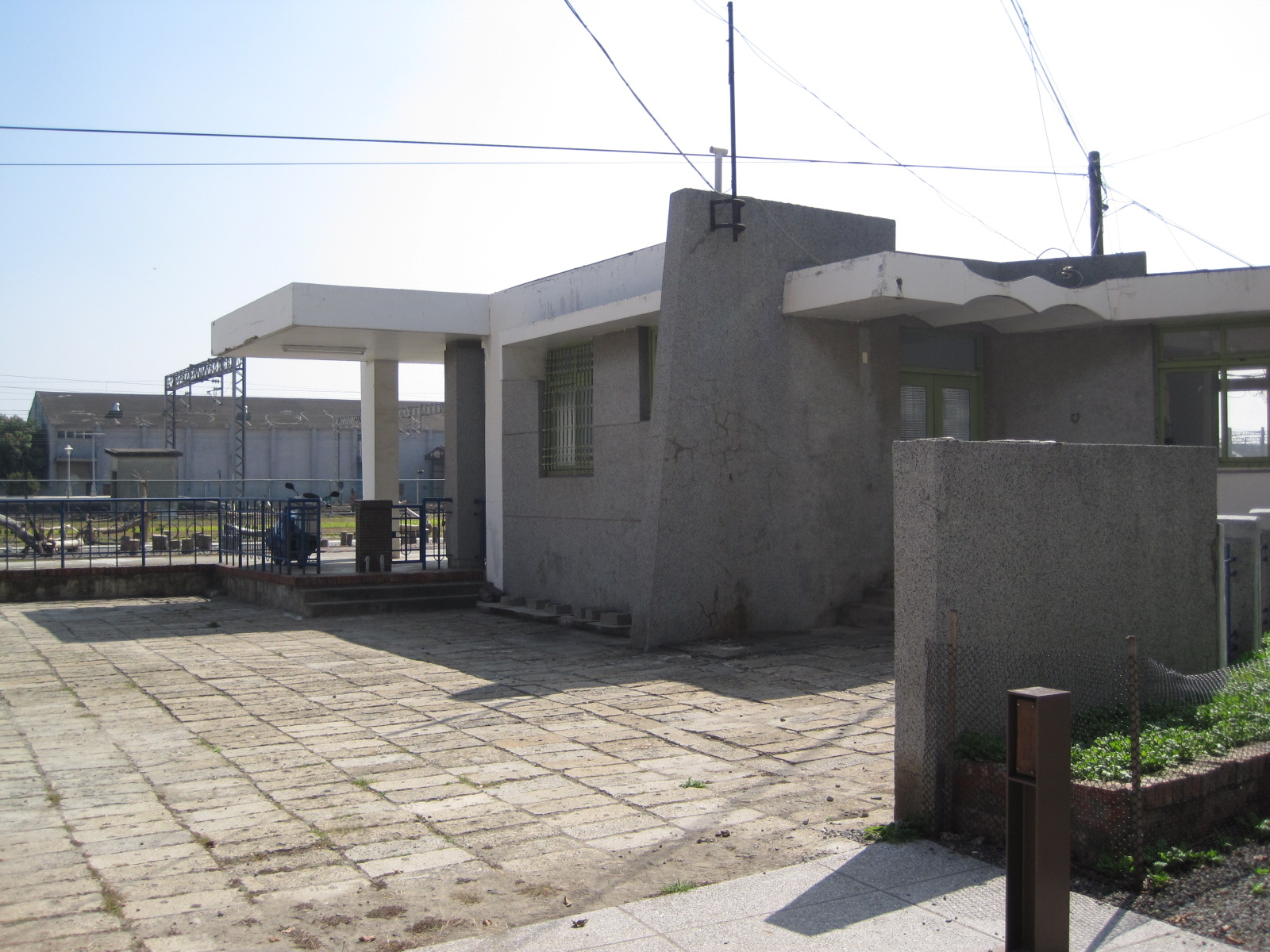
Preserved Taiwan Sugar Railways station building

The station has two island platforms as well as a tourist information center. It was formerly a station on the Taiwan Sugar Railways.

== History ==
- 16 December 1901: The station opens for service as Shin'ei Village Station (Japanese: 新營庄停車場).
- 20 May 1909: The Taiwan Sugar Railways station opens.
- 1 June 1920: The station name is changed to Shin'ei-eki (新營驛).
- 1934: The station is reconstructed and the second-generation station opens for service.
- 1 June 1960: Liuying Station opens and is under the administration of the station.
- 1964: The second-generation station building is expanded.
- 1976: The third-generation (and current) station building opens for service.
- 1979: The Taiwan Sugar Railways station closes.
- 1 June 2000: Houbi Station opens and is under the administration of the station.

== Platform layout ==
1	1A	■ West Coast line (northbound)	Toward Chiayi, Taichung, Taipei, Keelung
1	1A	■ Eastern line (cross-line southbound)	Toward Yilan, Suao, Hualien
2	1B	■ West Coast line (southbound)	Toward Tainan, Kaohsiung, Pingtung
2	1B	■ West Coast line (northbound, through track)	Toward Chiayi, Taichung, Taipei, Keelung
2	1B	■ South-link line (southbound)	Toward Taitung
3	2A	■ West Coast line (southbound, through track)	Toward Tainan, Kaohsiung, Pingtung
3	2A	■ West Coast line (northbound, originating)	Toward Chiayi
4	2B	■ Not in use	Not in use

== Around the station ==
- Xinying Cultural Center
- Tainan Police Department, Xinying Branch
- Xinying District Office
- Xinying Sugar Factory
- Xinying High School
- Nanguang High School
- Xingguo High School
- Xinying Senior Industrial Vocational School

== See also ==
- List of railway stations in Taiwan

Preceding station	Taiwan Railway	Following station
Houbi towards Keelung	Western Trunk line	Liuying towards Pingtung
