= Tainan City Government =

- 臺南市政府

Agency overview
- Formed: 25 December 2010
- Preceding agency: Tainan City Government, Tainan County Government
- Jurisdiction: Tainan City
- Headquarters: Yonghua Civic Center: No. 6, Sec. 2, Yonghua Rd., Anping Dist., Tainan City 708, Taiwan (R.O.C.); Minzhi Civic Center: No. 36, Minzhi Rd., Xinying Dist., Tainan City 730, Taiwan (R.O.C.)
- Minister responsible: Huang Wei-cher, Mayor
- Website: Tainan City Government

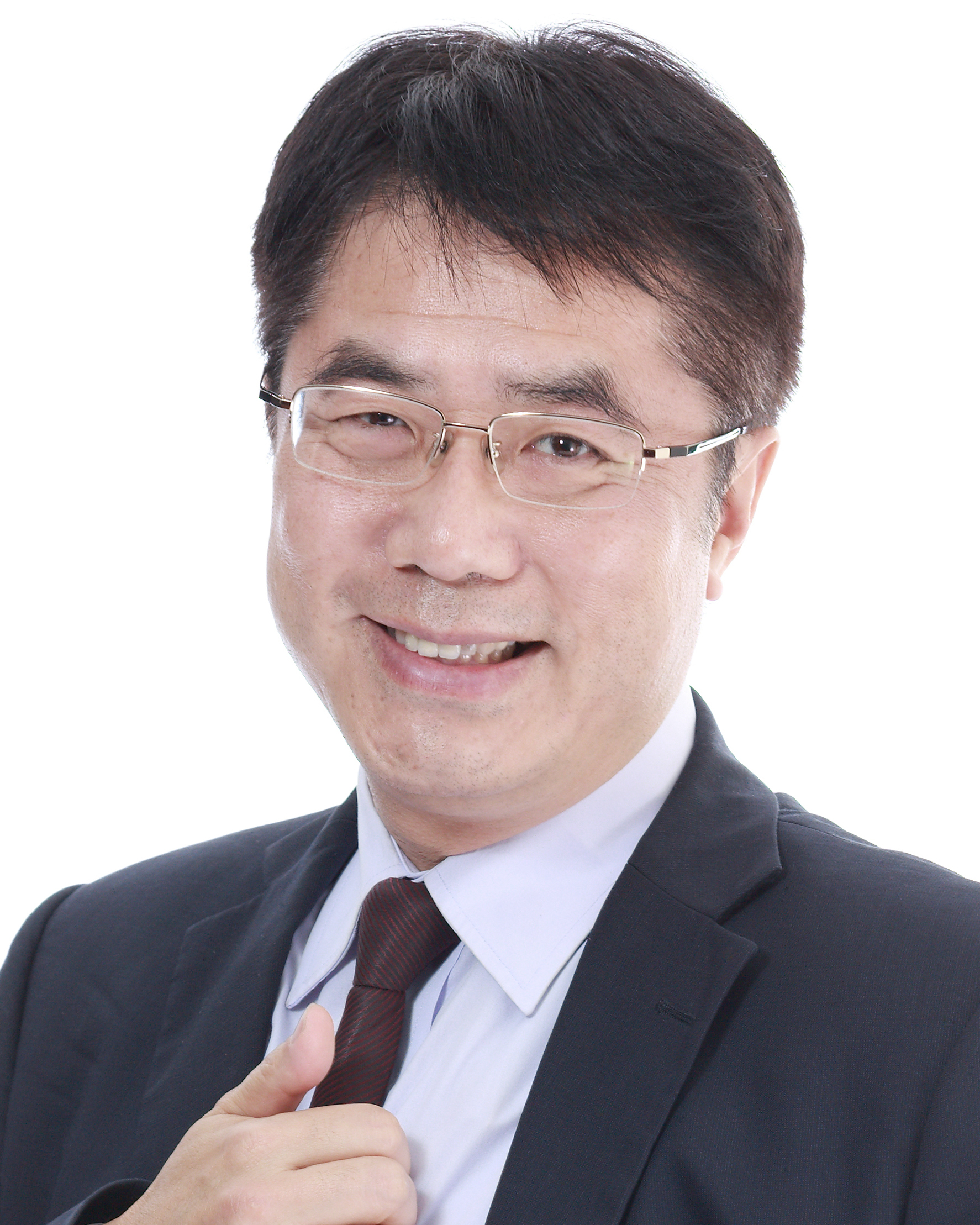
Huang Wei-cher, the incumbent Mayor of Tainan City.

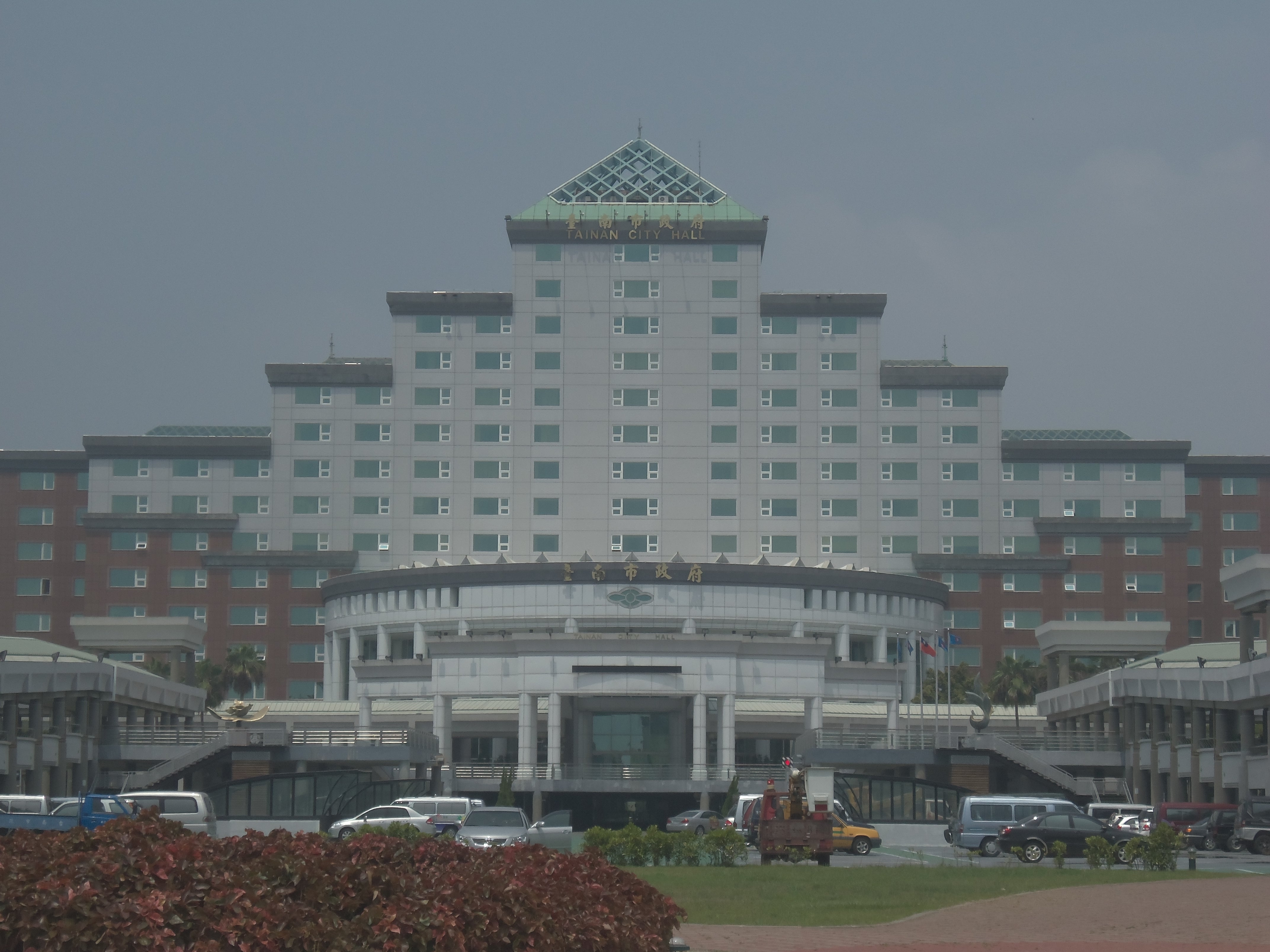
Tainan City Hall - Yonghua Administration Center

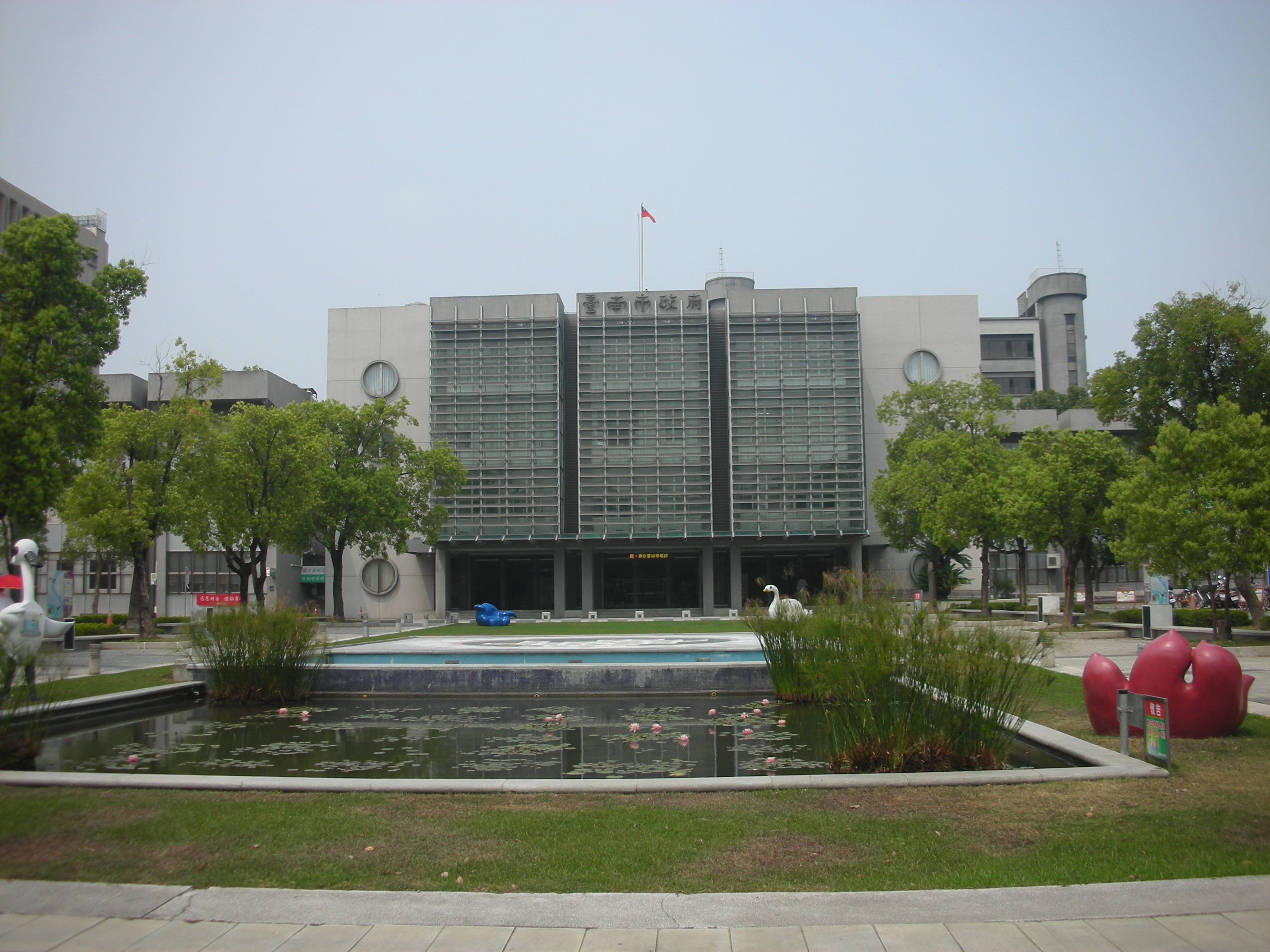
Tainan City Hall - Minjhih Administration Center

The Tainan City Government (Chinese: 臺南市政府; pinyin: Táinán Shì Zhèngfǔ) is the municipal government of Tainan, Taiwan. It was formed after the merger of Tainan County and Tainan City in December 2010. Its chief administrator is the directly elected Mayor of Tainan.

== Administration ==
=== Mayor ===
The mayor of Tainan City is the chief executive officer of the city. The mayor is elected for a four-year term and limited to serving no more than two terms. Under the mayor there are 2 deputy mayors, 1 secretary-general, 1 deputy secretary-general and 27 principal officers.

=== Bureaus ===
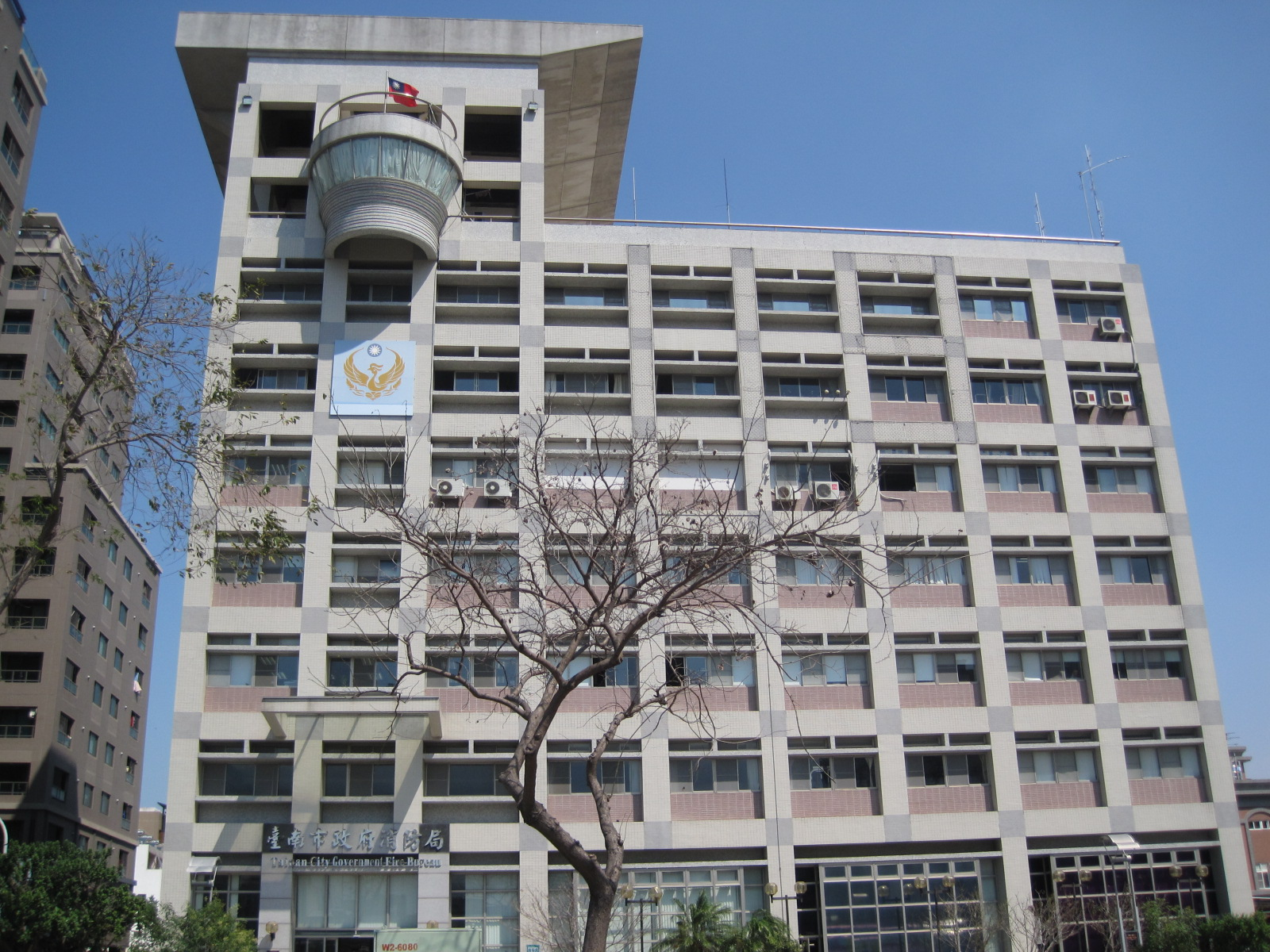
City Fire Bureau

Tainan Police Department

- Bureau of Civil Affairs
- Bureau of Education
- Bureau of Agriculture
- Bureau of Economic Development
- Bureau of Tourism
- Bureau of Public Works
- Bureau of Water Resources
- Bureau of Social Affairs
- Bureau of Labor
- Bureau of Land Administration
- Bureau of Urban development
- Bureau of Cultural Affairs
- Bureau of Transportation
- Bureau of Health
- Bureau of Environmental Protection
- Bureau of Local Tax
- Fire Bureau
- Police Department

=== Department ===
- Department of Finance
- Department of Legal Affairs
- Department of Information and International Relations
- Department of Personnel
- Department of Budget, Accounting and Statistics

=== Offices ===
- Office of Civil Service Ethics
- Secretariat

=== Commissions ===
- Ethnic Affairs Commission
- Research, Development and Evaluation Commission

== See also ==
- Tainan City Council
- Mayor of Tainan
- Tainan City
