= Shanjia =

Shanjia may refer to:

- Shanjia railway station, a railway station on the Taiwan Railways Administration West Coast line
- Shanjia Village (山佳里), Shulin District, New Taipei, Taiwan
- Shanjia Village (山佳里), Zhunan, Miaoli County, Taiwan
- Shanjia Village (单家村), Beisong, Lijin County, Dongying, Shandong Province, China
