= Shulin =

Shulin may refer to:

- Shulin, Albania
- Shulin District, New Taipei, Taiwan
- Shulin railway station, a railway station on the Taiwan Railways Administration West Coast line
- Shulin Refuse Incineration Plant, an incinerator in Shulin District, New Taipei, Taiwan
- Alexander Shulin (born 1963), Russian ice dancing coach and former competitor
- Su Shulin (born 1962), Chinese oil and gas executive and former politician

== See also ==
- Wanda–Zhonghe–Shulin line
