= Samuel Hsuan-yu Shih =

Taiwanese artist

Samuel Hsuan-Yu Shih
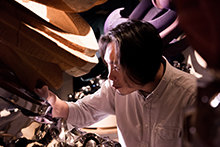
- in his studio in Taipei (2020)
- Born: 1974 (age 51–52); Taipei, Taiwan
- Known for: Ceramic art, sculpture, art director, curator
- Website: www.unit-9.com

Samuel Hsuan-Yu Shih (Chinese: 施宣宇 (Shih Hsuan-Yu)) (born 1974) is a Taiwanese artist, ceramist, sculptor , and curator. He is a member of the International Academy of Ceramics and a National Craftsman certified by the National Taiwan Crafts Research and Development Center. He also serves as the artistic director of UNIT-9 Ceramics & Visual Arts Office.

== Biography ==
Shih was born in 1974 in Taipei, Taiwan. At the age of 14, he began working as an assistant at a pottery studio, and in 1994, held his first solo exhibition at a gallery in Taipei at the age of 20.

At 22, he founded his own studio, UNIT-9 Ceramics & Visual Arts Office. In 1998, he worked at the Ceramics Studio at Santa Ana College in Santa Ana, California, United States.

In 2009 and 2011, Shih received awards at the Premio Faenza international ceramics biennale in Italy, including the Honour Award of the Presidency of the Chamber of Deputies of the Italian Republic and the Emilia-Romagna Legislative Assembly Award. In 2010, he was certified as a "Taiwan Craftsman" by the National Taiwan Crafts Research and Development Center.

In 2012, he was commissioned by Twinings to create a commemorative artwork for the 60th anniversary of Queen Elizabeth II’s Diamond Jubilee. The piece was presented at the celebration ceremony by David Campbell of the British Office in Taiwan.

In 2013, Shih was elected a member of the International Academy of Ceramics, an official partner of UNESCO’s cultural sector. In 2014, Shih participated in the International Academy of Ceramics (IAC) Annual Meeting held in Dublin, Ireland. His work, "Great Ambition"(御風瀚羽－鴻鵠之志), was selected as a Featured Artist and was exhibited at Dublin Castle during the meeting.

In 2016, he became the General Artistic Advisor for the Opera House and Concert Hall of the Straits Culture and Arts Center (SCAC) in Fuzhou, China, a project by PES Architects. As part of this project, he designed “China White” ceramic panels—including engraved and mosaic acoustic panels—that were custom-developed with acousticians to fit complex curved surfaces and ensure optimal sound quality.

In 2024, Shih served as the curator of the International Wood-fired Ceramic Art Expo (TRANOVA) at the Miaoli Ceramics Museum in Taiwan. The exhibition, titled *"TRANOVA: Inheritance and Innovation,"* emphasized the transmission of ceramic traditions and their contemporary transformation.

== Artistic style ==
Shih Hsuan-yu's works are characterized by intricate patterns, refined modeling, and a vibrant use of colors. His art frequently integrates metal and glass elements, with ceramics serving as the central medium.

His early works have been described as focused on observations of contemporary social phenomena, including mechanized perceptions of time, the rise of labeling and barcoding as a social order, consumerist religious fervor, and generational differences in the use of written symbols. These works often combined ready-made objects such as glass tubes, chains, weights, wires, wood, and clocks, with surfaces inscribed with text, numbers, or barcodes.

Later commentators have noted that this strategy created works which simultaneously conveyed declarative meaning while destabilizing habitual interpretations, producing a sense of dissonance and self-reflection in the viewer.

Since 2001, his practice has increasingly drawn on classical references to address contemporary questions, resulting in series such as the *Sitar Series* and the *Wings in the Wind Series*. The *Sitar Series*, inspired by the Indian string instrument traditionally crafted and played uniquely by each musician, has been interpreted as emphasizing individuality and natural vitality beyond rigid conventions. The *Wings in the Wind Series* depicts large wings and expressive eyes, symbolizing freedom from external constraints and the pursuit of expansive vision.

His work has been characterized as a fusion of elemental combinations, simplification, and substitution, with advanced techniques that emphasize sculptural form and conceptual depth.

In *The History of the Development of Modern Ceramics in Taiwan*,his practice is described as "avant-garde" and "culturally critical." The study emphasizes his figurative approach to ceramics, integrating multiple materials and symbolic or architectural vocabularies. His works have been interpreted as engaging in a cross-disciplinary dialogue with postmodern concepts, broadening the expressive possibilities of ceramic art.

== Awards ==
- 2011 – Special Honor Award of the Legislative Assembly, the 57th Faenza International Biennale of Ceramic Art, Italy
- 2009 – Special Honor Award of the President of the Chamber of Deputies, the 56th Faenza International Biennale of Ceramic Art, Italy
- 2003 – Grand Prize, the 3rd Taipei Ceramics Award, Taiwan
- 2002 – Grand Prize, the 16th Nanying Award, Taiwan
- 2000 – Excellence Award, the 14th Nanying Award, Taiwan

== Selected collections ==
- 2007 – Daughter Sammy, New Taipei City Yingge Ceramics Museum, Taiwan
- 2006 – Heavenly Lotus Scroll, National Museum of History, Taiwan
- 2003 – Drifting Twin Western Pagodas, New Taipei City Yingge Ceramics Museum, Taiwan
- 2002 – The Law of Cosmic Expansion, Bureau of Cultural Affairs, Tainan City Government, Taiwan
- 2000 – Consensus Delusion Scroll, National Museum of History, Taiwan
- 1998 – Celestial Orbital Path, New Taipei City Yingge Ceramics Museum, Taiwan
- 1992 – The Narrow Gate, Chiu Ho-cheng Foundation, Taiwan

== Solo exhibitions ==
- 2013 – Floral Paper Sealed with Jade, Art Taipei / Ever Harvest Art Gallery, Taiwan
- 2013 – Eternal Poetry, New Taipei City Arts Center, Taiwan
- 2011 – XI - Xinhai, INCONTRI CON IL CINEMA ASIATICO 12, Museum of Contemporary Art of Rome (MACRO), Italy
- 2010 – Cheng, Art Taipei / Elsa Gallery, Taiwan
- 2004 – Shaping the Circle, New Taipei City Yingge Ceramics Museum, Taiwan
- 1999 – Riding the Wind with Vast Feathers, Dunhuang Art Gallery, Hsinchu, Taiwan
- 1998 – Celestial Spine, Dunhuang Art Gallery, Taipei, Taiwan
- 1994 – Harmonic Wavelength, Dunhuang Art Gallery, Taipei, Taiwan
