= Hongshulin =

Hongshulin may refer to:

- Hongshulin Coastal Ecological Park (红树林海滨生态公园), an ecological park of the Shenzhen Bay Park
- Hongshulin Nature Reserve (红树林自然保护区), an area of the Shenzhen Bay Park
- Hongshulin station, a station of the Taipei Metro and the Danhai light rail
- Dongzhai Port Nature Reserve (东寨港红树林自然保护区; PinyinDōngzhài Gǎng Hóngshùlín Zìránbǎohùqū), an area of Yanfeng Town, Meilan District, Haikou, Hainan, China

== See also ==
- Shulin (disambiguation)
