= Sanxia En Zhugong Hospital double homicide case =

2012 crime in Taiwan

The Sanxia En Zhugong Hospital double homicide case refers to a murder committed on December 10, 2012, in which brothers Shen Wen-bin and Shen Wen-xia abducted Pan Meng-yao and Lü Jun-wei, employees of a betel nut stand in Dongshan Township, Yilan County, Taiwan, transported them to Daxi District, Taoyuan City, and pushed them into an irrigation ditch where they were held underwater and drowned. The bodies were later abandoned in the parking lot of En Zhugong Hospital in Sanxia District, New Taipei City.

In 2024, the Constitutional Court accepted a petition for constitutional interpretation concerning the death penalty filed by Shen Wen-bin and 37 other death row inmates.

== Course of the Crime ==
The perpetrator Shen Wen-bin, whose wife had left him due to domestic violence, went with his younger brother Shen Wen-xia, who lived in Yingge, to his wife’s parental home in search of her. Unable to find her, the two brothers armed themselves with a long gun and a baton and went to a betel nut stand operated by the wife’s elder brother. They abducted one female and one male employee, namely Pan Meng-yao, the girlfriend of Shen’s brother-in-law, and Lü Jun-wei, a neighbor. Pan was the owner of the betel nut stand, while Lü was Pan’s friend.

During the journey from Yilan back to Yingge, Pan consistently refused to reveal the whereabouts of Shen Wen-bin’s wife, leading Shen to develop the intent to kill. In addition to wanting to kill Pan to vent his anger, Shen also intended to kill Lü in order to conceal the crime. The two searched for a suitable location along the riverside bicycle path beneath the Sanying Bridge.

In Daxi District, Taoyuan City, they first pushed Lü into an irrigation ditch several tens of centimeters deep and held him underwater until he drowned. They then pulled Pan into the water and repeatedly forced her face underwater until she ceased struggling. Afterward, the bodies were abandoned in the parking lot of En Zhugong Hospital.

== Judicial Proceedings ==
After proceedings including the first trial, second trial, retrial (first, second, third, and fourth instances), the courts determined that Shen Wen-bin’s crime was extremely serious and that the possibility of rehabilitation was low. A total of 18 judges sentenced him to death, resulting in six death sentences.

Shen Wen-xia, the younger brother, was sentenced to 14 years in the second retrial and 19 years in the fourth retrial, while other defendants received life imprisonment. In October 2019, the High Court, in the fourth retrial, sentenced the younger brother to 19 years in prison for aiding in homicide. The prosecution appealed, arguing that he should have been classified as a co-principal offender, while both sides appealed the verdict.

The Supreme Court held that the appeals did not meet the legal procedural requirements and dismissed them, making the 19-year sentence final.

In the reasoning of the fourth retrial judgment, the court stated that after killing Lü, Shen Wen-bin showed no compassion or remorse, nor did he experience fear after committing his first killing. Instead, he forcibly submerged Pan in the water, pulled her out, and repeatedly forced her underwater until she stopped struggling or responding, constituting torturous killing. This behavior demonstrated a complete lack of conscience, and the methods used were exceptionally cruel.

Shen Wen-bin appealed the fourth retrial verdict, and in March 2020, the Supreme Court convened an oral argument session to conduct a life-and-death debate. Psychiatrist Wu Jian-chang was summoned to court for examination, allowing cross-examination by both the prosecution and defense. The court confirmed that the death penalty was unavoidable, and that it did not violate the principle of proportionality, the principle of culpability commensurate with punishment, or constitute an abuse of sentencing discretion. This marked the first instance in legal history where psychiatric evaluation was investigated during a formal court hearing.

On March 31, 2020, the Supreme Court held that the assessment of Shen’s rehabilitative potential was irrelevant to the outcome of the death penalty decision, and that to comply with the principle of culpability and realize judicial justice, the death sentence was finalized.

In 2024, the Constitutional Court accepted the petition for constitutional interpretation regarding the death penalty submitted by Shen Wen-bin and 37 other death row inmates.
