= Yingge station =

Railway station in New Taipei, Taiwan

Yingge 鶯歌
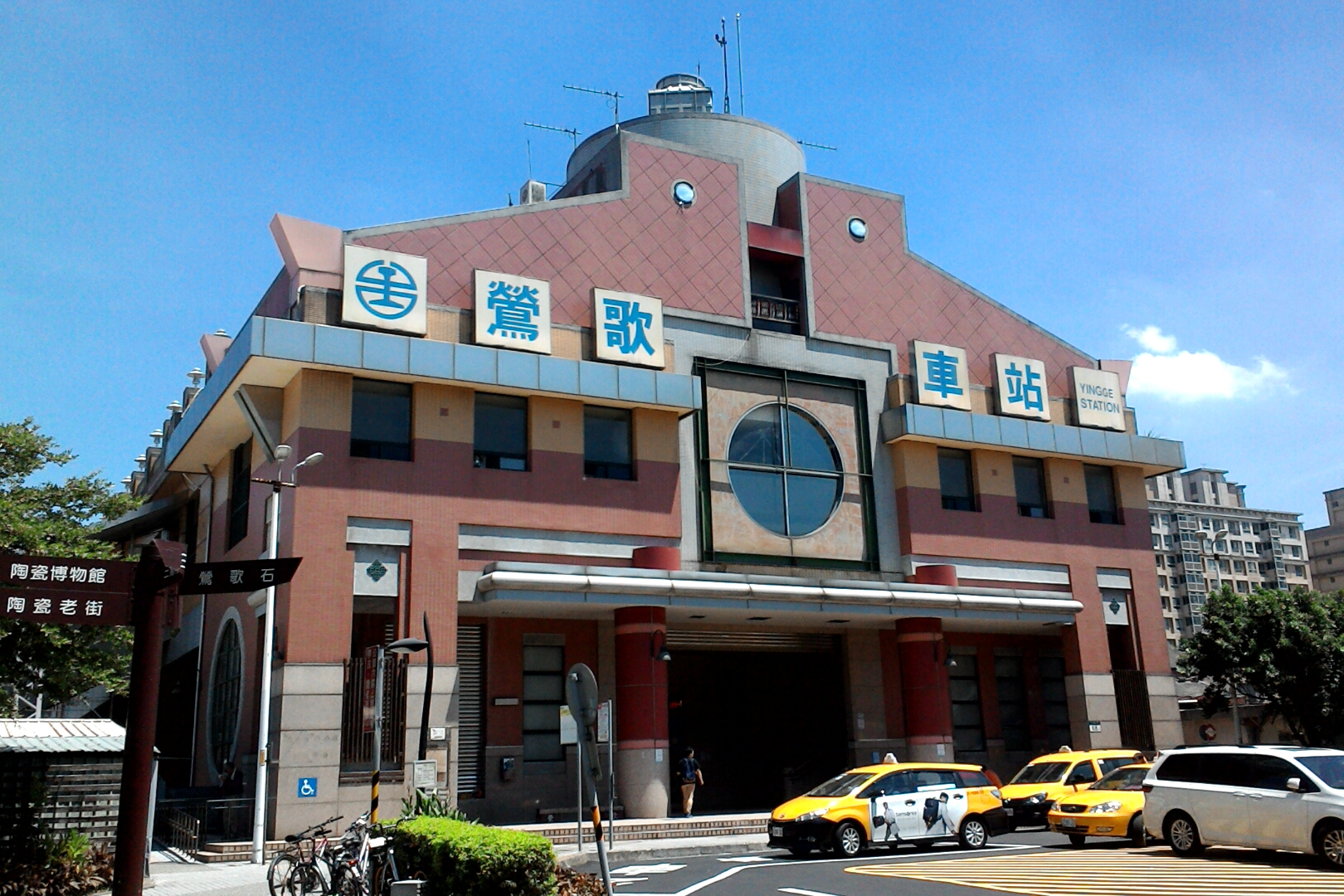

Chinese name
- Traditional Chinese: 鶯歌
Transcriptions
Standard Mandarin
- Hanyu Pinyin: Yīnggē
- Bopomofo: ㄧㄥ ㄍㄜ

General information
- Location: 68-1 Wenhua Rd; Yingge District, New Taipei; Taiwan
- Coordinates: 24.9545°N 121.3552°E
- System: TRA railway station
- Line: Western Trunk line
- Distance: 49.2 km to Keelung
- Connections: Local bus; Coach

Construction
- Structure type: Ground level

Other information
- Station code: A17 (statistical)
- Classification: Second class (Chinese: 二等)
- Website: www.railway.gov.tw/yingge/index.aspx (in Chinese)

History
- Opened: 25 August 1901
- Rebuilt: 24 January 2003
- Electrified: 9 January 1978

Key dates
- 16 May 1922: Relocated

Passengers
- 2017: 6.266 million per year ▼1.09%
- Rank: 18 out of 228

Services
Preceding station	Taiwan Railway	Following station
Shanjia towards Keelung	Western Trunk line	Taoyuan towards Kaohsiung
Location
- Location within Taiwan

Yingge Station LB08 鶯歌車站
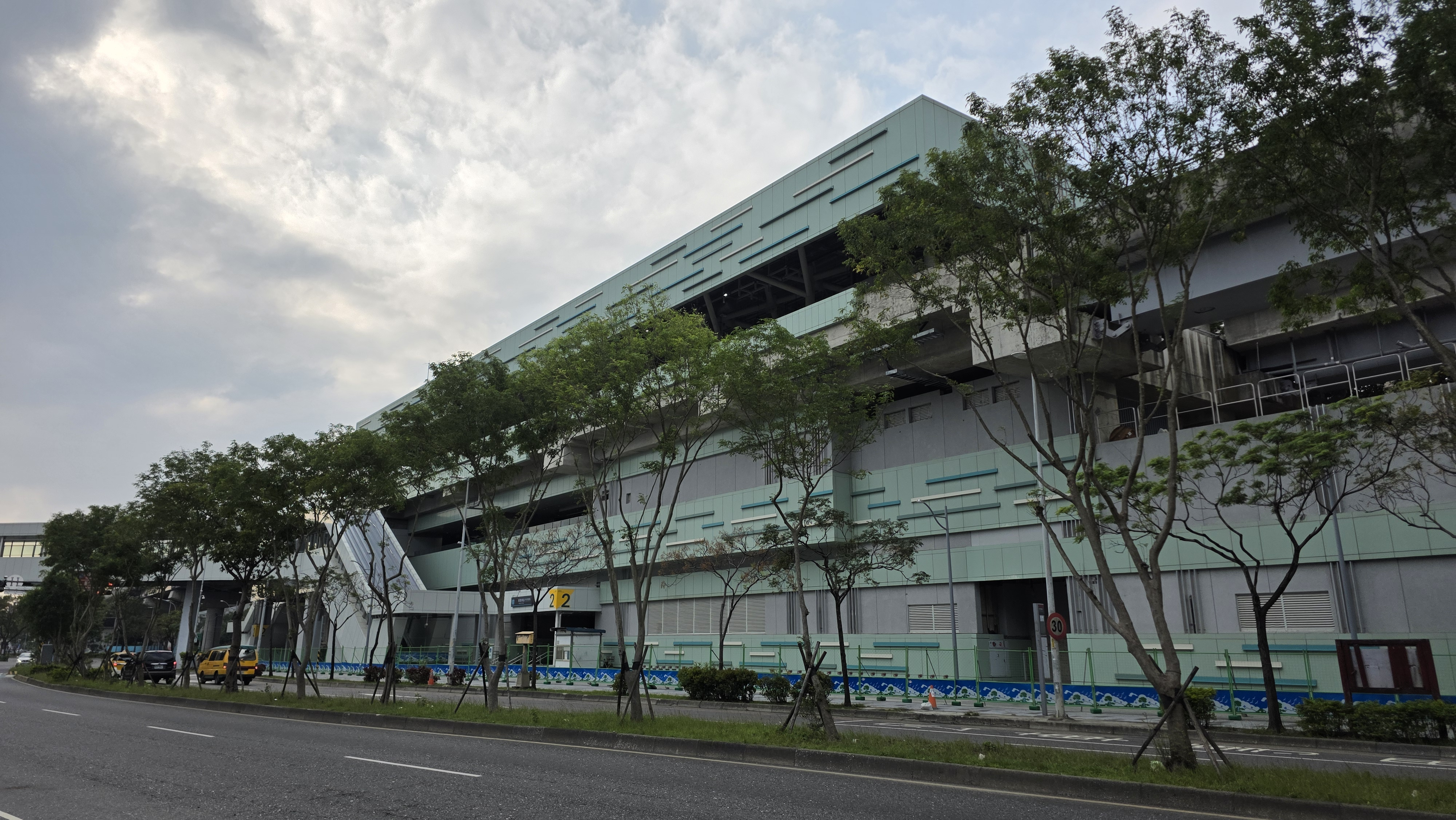

General information
- Coordinates: 24°57′11.6″N 121°21′23.3″E
- Elevation: Above-ground
- Operator: New Taipei Metro
- Line: Sanying line
- Platforms: 1 (Island platform)
- Tracks: 2

Other information
- Station code: LB08

History
- Opening: June 30, 2026

Services
Preceding station	New Taipei Metro	Following station
National Taipei University towards Dingpu	Sanying line	Ceramics Old Street towards Yingtao Fude
Location

Yingge (Chinese: 鶯歌; pinyin: Yīnggē) is a railway station of Taiwan Railway in Yingge District, New Taipei, Taiwan. It is also a station on the New Taipei Metro's Sanying line. It is the only station on Sanying line that can transfer to Taiwan Railway. Passengers can transfer between the two lines via connecting corridors..

== Overview ==
The railway station has two island platforms, and the main station building is located over the tracks. The station accepts EasyCard or TWSC for payment for travel from Ruifang to Hsinchu (29 stations).

=== History ===
- 25 August 1901: The station opened for service.
- 16 May 1922: Station relocation completed, following an incident on 21 June 1918, which killed 13 people.
- 24 January 2003: The new station building opened for service.
- 1 August 2008: The use of EasyCard started at this station.
- 2016: Construction on the Sanying line began.
- 2026: Sanying line opened for service.

== Around the station ==
Night markets and old streets

- Yingge Nanyang Night Market (600m to the west)
- Yingge Historic Ceramics Street (700m to the southwest)
- Yingge Old Street (1km to the southwest)
- Ying Ge Guanguang Night Market (1.8km to the west)

Museums

- New Taipei City Yingge Ceramics Museum (700m to the southwest)
- New Taipei City Art Museum

Parks and rivers

- Dahan River
- Sanying Art Village (750m to the southeast)
- Sanying Ceramics Riverside Park (1.2km to the southeast)
- Sanying Bicycle Rental (650m to the southeast)

Historical sites

- Old Yingge Station

Government offices

- Yingge District Office (200m to the northwest)

== See also ==
- List of railway stations in Taiwan
