= New Taipei Municipal Yingge Vocational High School =

Coordinates: 24°58′31.61″N 121°26′57.76″E

- 新北市立鶯歌高級工商職業學校

Location
- No.154, Zhongzheng 3rd Rd., Yingge Dist., New Taipei City 239002, Taiwan

Information
- Type: Vocational High School
- Established: 1997
- School district: Yingge District, New Taipei City, Taiwan
- Principal: Mr. Long-Yuan, Yan
- Website: https://www.ykvs.ntpc.edu.tw/

The New Taipei Municipal Yingge Vocational High School (YKVS) is a professional school located in Yingge District, New Taipei, Taiwan. It was founded in 1997. The area of the main campus is 4.7497 hectares (11.737 acres). As of 2021 the principal was Long-Yuan, Yan.

== School history ==
The construction of the administration and teaching buildings began in March 1994. By July 1994, the Planning, Preparation and Consulting Committee was established to begin strategic planning for the school.

The Preparation Department was formally established in July 1996. Lin was assigned as director, focused on establishing the school system.

By June 1997, the Taipei County Government granted Lin formal approval. On August 1, 1997, the Ceramic Engineering, Fine Art and Crafts, Advertising Design, and Data Processing departments were approved, and 4 classes were added. By December 8, 1997, 14 more classes were added.

Hsu Chao-chung (許朝宗), a noted ceramics artist, taught at the school for a number of years as of 2013.

On December 24, 1999, the Information department and related classes were approved and established.

By 2010, a General Class for sports was added.

== See also ==
- Education in Taiwan
