= South Shulin railway station =

Railway station in New Taipei, Taiwan

South Shulin Station 南樹林車站
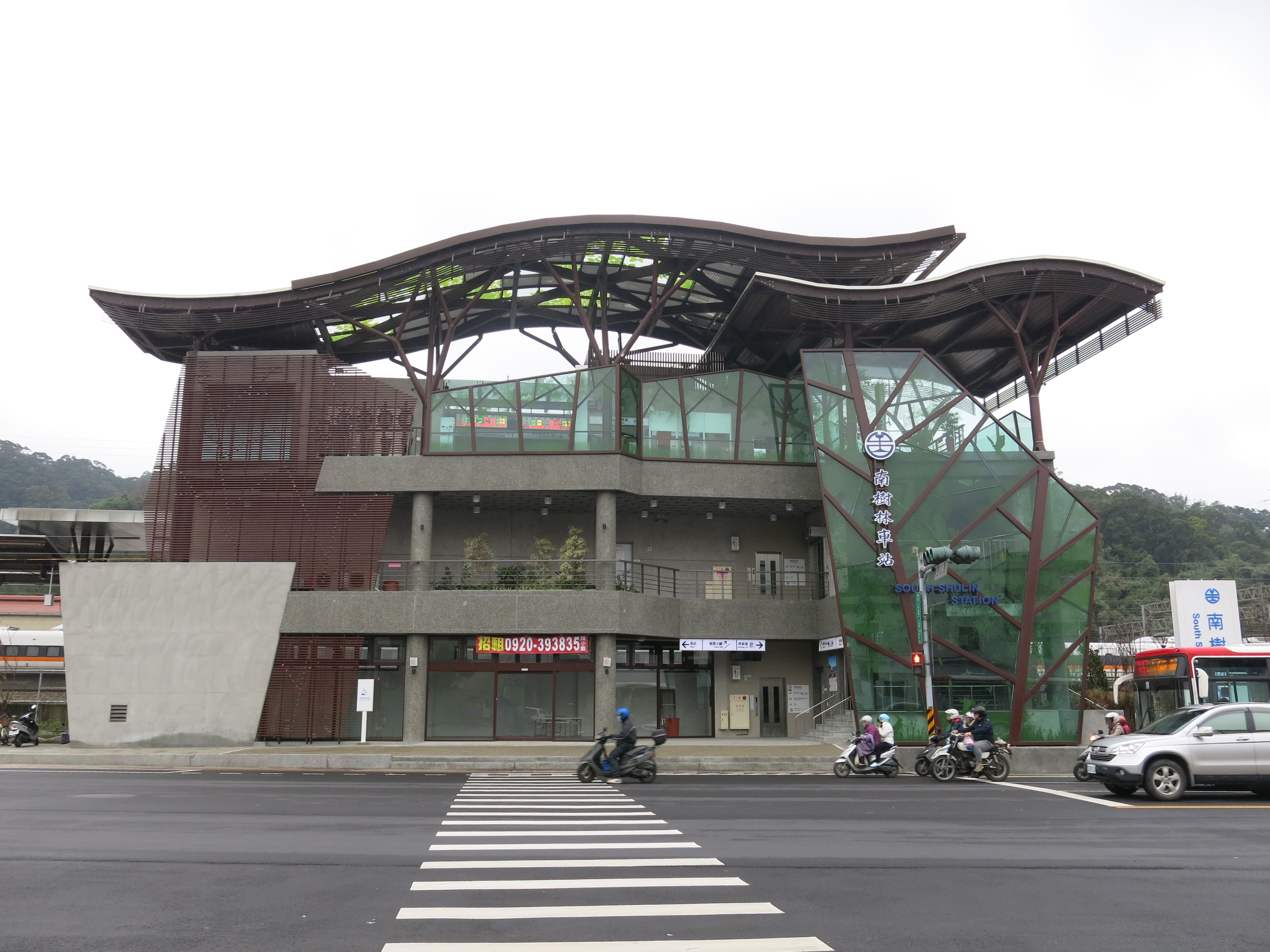

General information
- Location: Shulin, New Taipei, Taiwan
- Coordinates: 24.9804°N 121.4089°E
- Owner: Taiwan Railway
- Operator: Taiwan Railway
- Line: Western Trunk line
- Train operators: Taiwan Railway

History
- Opened: 23 December 2015

Services
Preceding station	Taiwan Railway	Following station
Shulin towards Keelung	Western Trunk line	Shanjia towards Kaohsiung
Location

South Shulin (Chinese: 南樹林車站; pinyin: Nán Shùlín Chēzhàn) is a station on the Taiwan Railway West Coast line located in Shulin District, New Taipei, Taiwan. South Shulin station is located at the intersection of Zhongshan Road and Dongxing Street.

== Name ==
Representatives of the Shulin District office surveyed 1078 citizens to gather public opinion on a favorable station name. The results of the survey were as follows: South Shulin (42.5%), Dongxing (30.5%). The remaining names include: Shijin Shouji (0.4%), Dongshan (0.3%), Xia Shanjia (0.2%), Shulin Dispatch Station (0.1%), Shujia (0.1%), Xinxing (0.1%), Shuxing (0.1%), New Shulin (0.1%).

Before the opening of the station, the area in which the station is currently located was called "Shulin Train Yard and Simple Train Stop." On 25 March 2015, the Shulin District Office held a naming meeting to determine the name of the future train station. Station names such as Shushan, Shudiao, and South Shulin were considered before deciding on the name South Shulin Station.

== History ==
Shulin Station was built as a commuter station and is the third station in New Taipei City's Shulin District, after Shulin Station and Shanjia Station.

- 12/4/2007: Groundbreaking ceremony
- 2/2009: Construction began, budget NTD 125 million
- 8/2015: Construction completed
- 12/23/2015: Station opened

== Station structure ==
- one island platform
- Platform A: Taiwan Railway main line toward Taoyuan, Hsinchu (Shanjia Station)
- Platform B: Taiwan Railway main line toward Taipei, Keelung/Su'ao (Shulin Station)

== Service ==
- Service only to local trains
  - Trains longer than eight cars are not permitted to stop at this station or similar commuter stations including Sankeng, Fuzhou, Fugang, North Hsinchu.
- Management of this station falls under the supervision of Shulin Station.
- This station accepts EasyCard, iPASS, and other similar contactless smartcards as payments.

== Around the station ==
- Sijihong Community
- Shulin Marshalling Yard
- YouBike Station
  - South Shulin Station
- Lujiao Creek Wetlands (1.8km to the southeast)
- Dongsheng Park (900m to the northeast)
