= Shulin railway station =

Railway station in New Taipei, Taiwan

Shulin 樹林
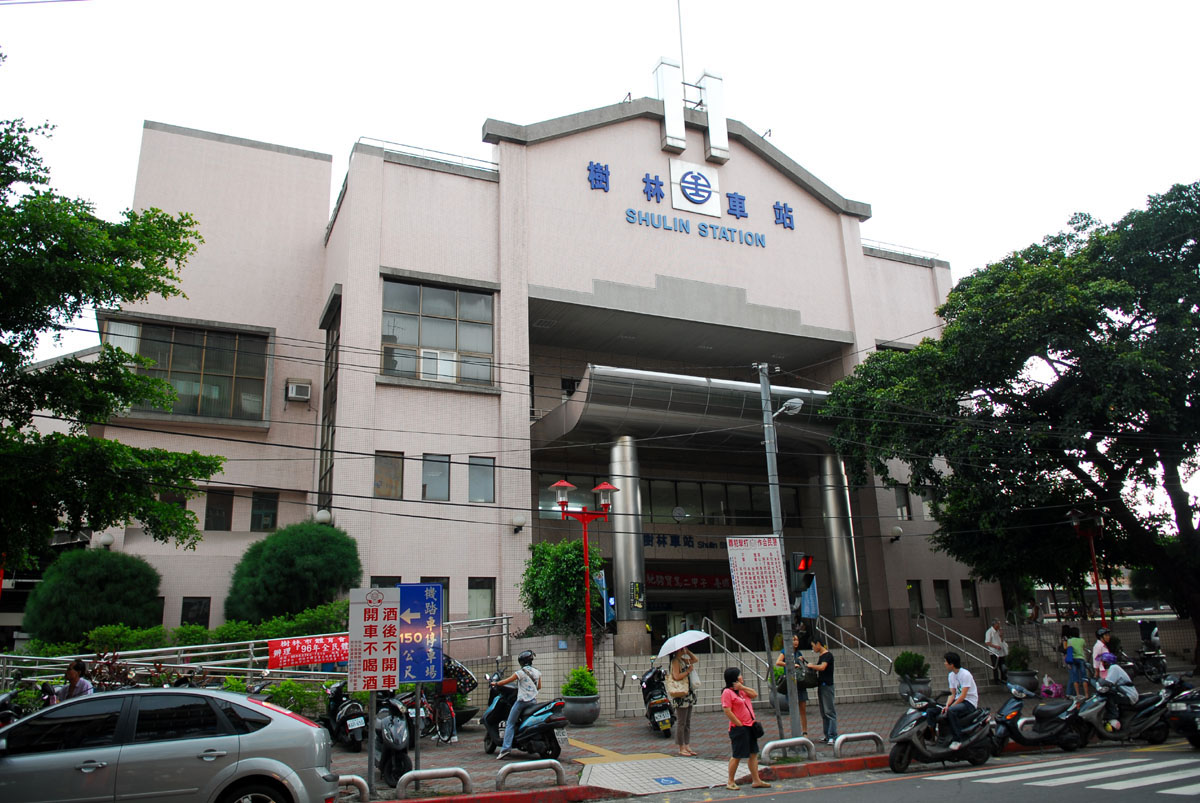

Chinese name
- Traditional Chinese: 樹林
Transcriptions
Standard Mandarin
- Hanyu Pinyin: Shùlín
- Bopomofo: ㄕㄨˋ ㄌㄧㄣˊ

General information
- Location: 112 Zhanqian St; Shulin District, New Taipei; Taiwan
- Coordinates: 24.9913°N 121.4246°E
- System: Taiwan Railway railway station
- Line: Western Trunk line
- Distance: 40.9 km to Keelung
- Connections: Local bus; Coach

Construction
- Structure type: Ground level

Other information
- Station code: 103 (three-digit); 1012 (four-digit); A15 (statistical)
- Classification: First class (Chinese: 一等)
- Website: www.railway.gov.tw/shulin/ (in Chinese)

History
- Opened: 25 August 1901
- Rebuilt: 27 September 1997
- Electrified: 9 January 1978

Passengers
- 2017: 11.345 million per year ▼0.72%
- Rank: 10 out of 228

Services
Preceding station	Taiwan Railway	Following station
Fuzhou towards Keelung	Western Trunk line	South Shulin towards Kaohsiung
Location
- Location within Taiwan

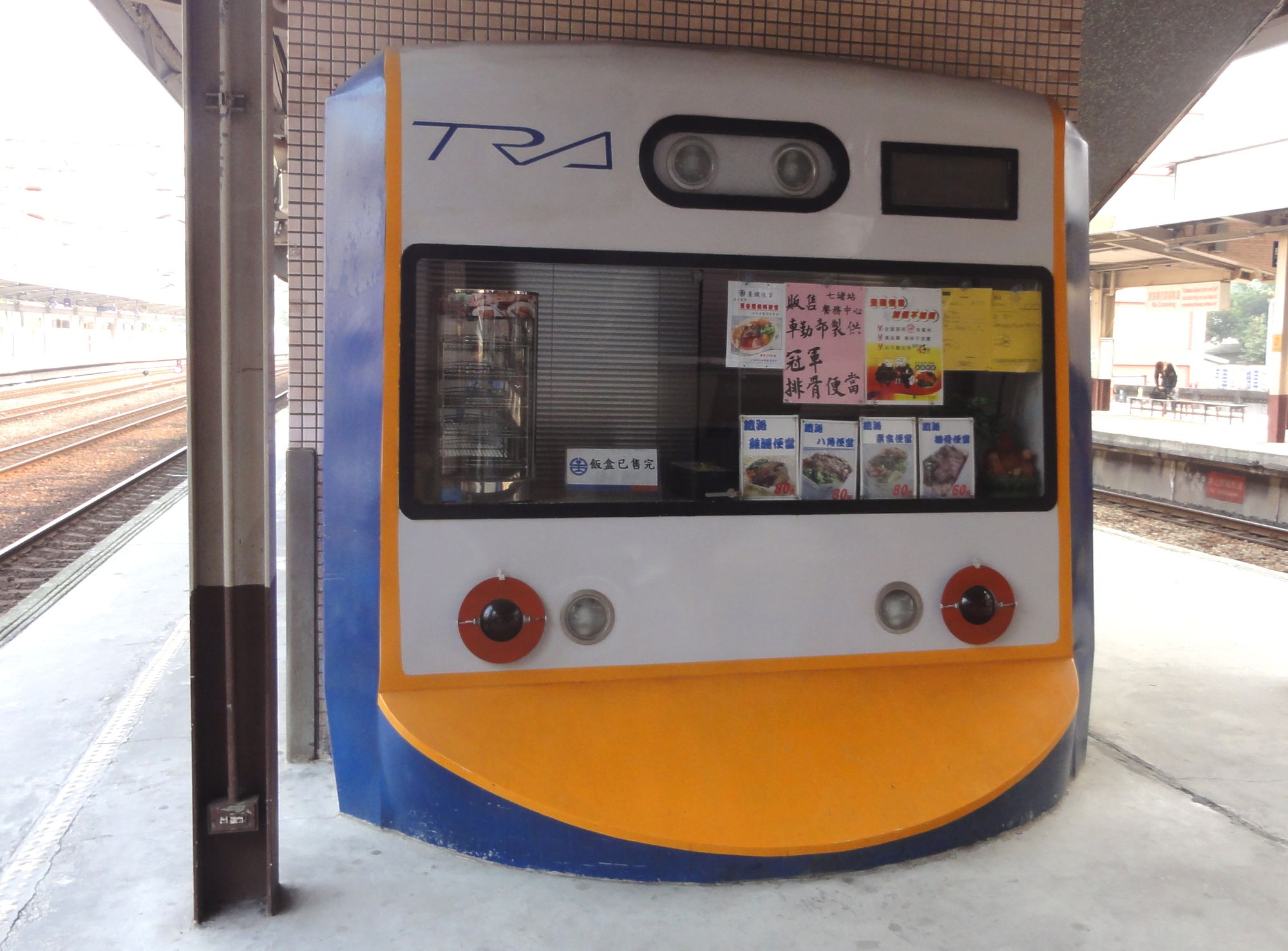
Shulin station lunchbox counter in the style of Taiwan Railway EMU700 series

Shulin (Chinese: 樹林; pinyin: Shùlín) is a railway station in New Taipei, Taiwan served by Taiwan Railway.

== Overview ==
The station has two island platforms and a side platform. The side platform opened on 3 May 2007, but is only rarely used for terminating trains. The cross station-type building allows passengers to buy tickets on the second floor with connections to platforms at ground level. Tis is also the origin station for most eastbound trains to Yilan, Hualien, and Taitung.

== History ==
- 1901-08-25: Opened as "Shulin Dropping station"
- 1902-06-01: Name changed to "Shulin Stopping station"
- 1940-12: Name changed to "Shulin station"
- 1955-01-01: Designated as a 2nd level (2nd) station
- 1966-01-01: Designated as a 2nd level (1st) station
- 1985-07-01: Designated as a 1st level station
- 1994-07-26: The old station was demolished. The station was moved into a temporary structure.
- 1997-03-14: Shulin Yard begins operations. The Eastern line terminus is shifted from Banqiao to Shulin.
- 1997-09-27: The new cross-station type building opens.
- 2007-05-03: The third platform opens.
- 2008-06-20: The Taipei-Shulin segment begins trials with payment using the EasyCard.
- 2009-07: A lunchbox counter opens on Platform 2.
- 2010-03-26: EasyCard usage officially begins.

== Platform configuration ==
1	1A	■ West Coast line (southbound)	toward Taichung, Kaohsiung
1	1A	■ West Coast line (northbound)	terminus
2	1B	■ West Coast line (southbound)	toward Taichung, Kaohsiung
3	2A	■ West Coast line (northbound)	toward Taipei, Keelung
4	2B	■ West Coast line (northbound)	toward Taipei, Keelung
4	2B	■ Eastern line (southbound)	toward Hualien, Taitung, Kaohsiung (via the South-link line)
4	2B	■ Eastern line (northbound)	terminus
5		■ Linkou line (north/southbound)	shunting
7	3	■ Eastern line (north/southbound)	terminus

== Around the station ==
Night markets

- Shulin Night Market (100m to the east)
- Shulin Xingren Garden Night Market (1.7km to the northwest)

Temples

- Shulin Baoan Temple (350m to the northeast)

Government offices

- Shulin District Office (150m to the south)

Science and industrial parks

- Shulin Datong Science Park (formerly Shulin Winery)

Schools

- Shulin High School (1km to the south)
- Shuren School of Home Economics (private)

== See also ==
- List of railway stations in Taiwan
