= Shulin Refuse Incineration Plant =

Incinerator in Shulin, New Taipei, Taiwan

Shulin Refuse Incineration Plant 樹林垃圾焚化廠
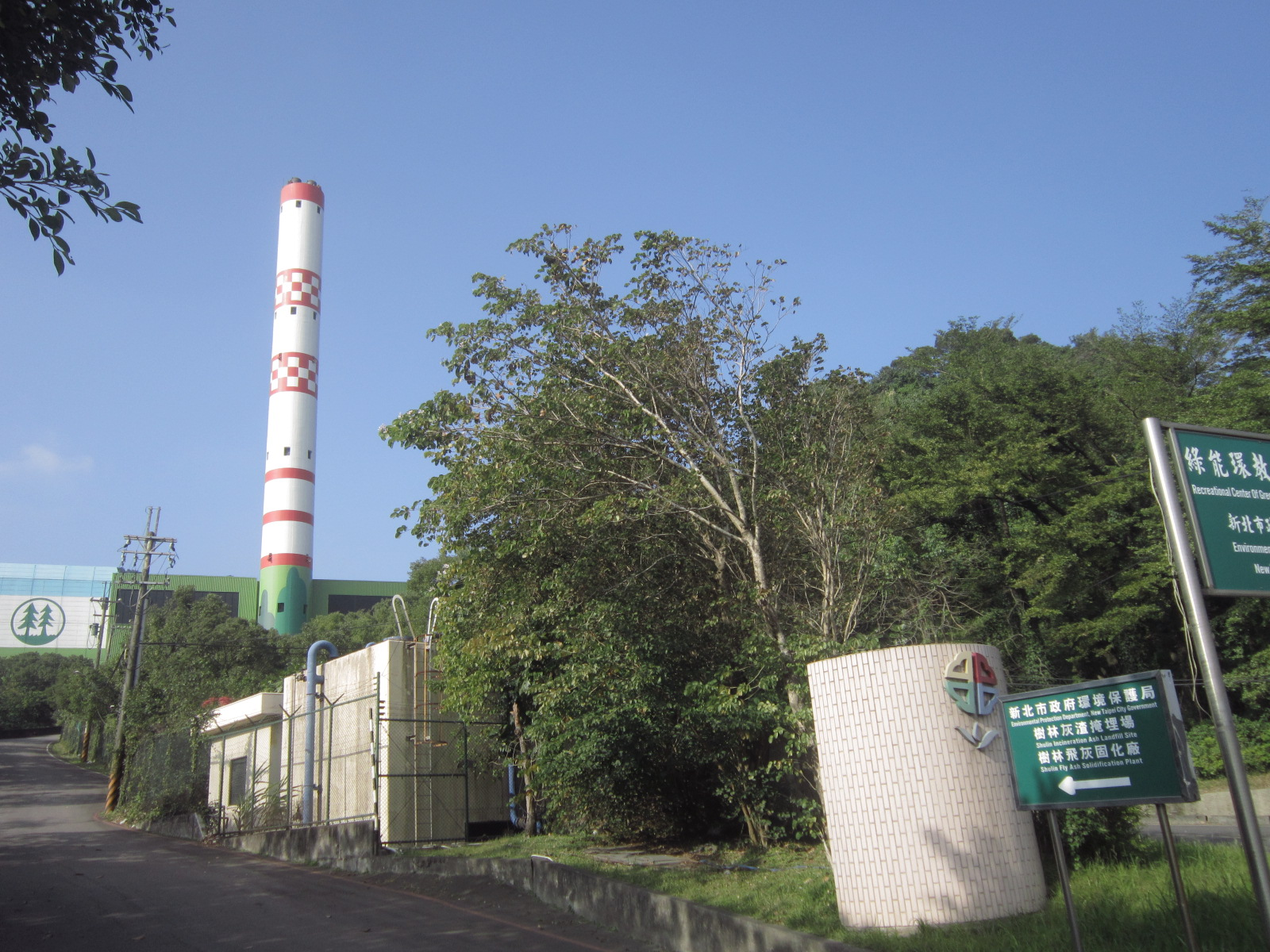
- Built: 1992
- Operated: 1995
- Location: Shulin, New Taipei, Taiwan
- Coordinates: 24°58′1.6″N 121°22′48.5″E
- Industry: waste management
- Style: incinerator
- Area: 1.8 ha (4.4 acres)
- Owner: New Taipei City Government

The Shulin Refuse Incineration Plant (traditional Chinese: 樹林垃圾焚化廠; simplified Chinese: 树林垃圾焚化厂; pinyin: Shùlín Lèsè Fénhuà Chǎng) is an incinerator in Shulin District, New Taipei, Taiwan.

== History ==
The construction of the plant started in 1992 and completed in 1995. It began its commercial operation the same year.

== Technical details ==
The plant has a capacity of treating 450 tons of garbage per day in each of its three boilers. As of 2020, it received a total of 17,685 tons of garbage annually and incinerated 18,876 tons of them.

== Transportation ==
The plant is accessible within walking distance south west of Shanjia Station of Taiwan Railway.

== See also ==
- Air pollution in Taiwan
