= Yingge District =

District in New Taipei, Taiwan

Yingge 鶯歌區 Ōka, Yingko
- District
- Yingge District
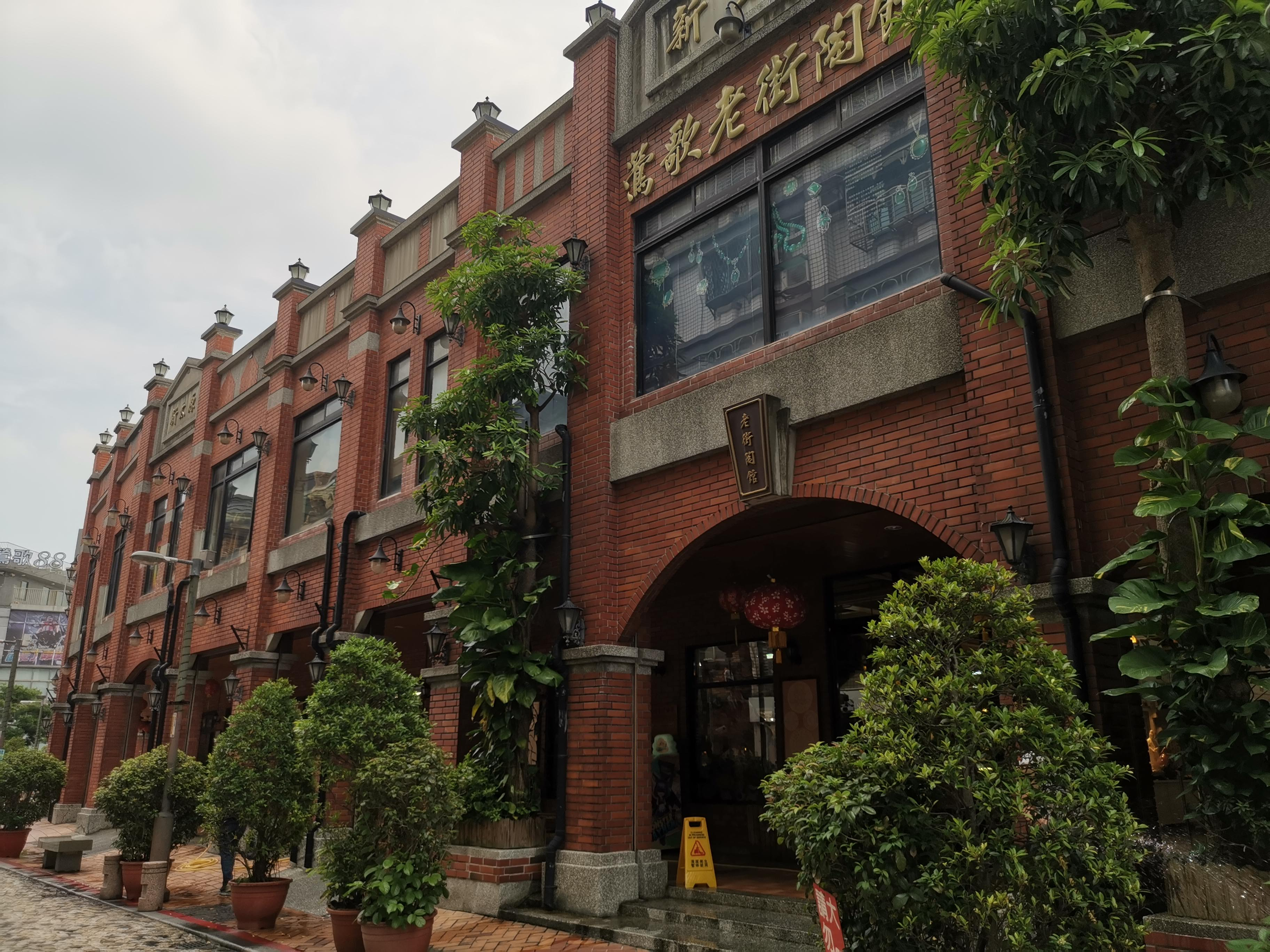

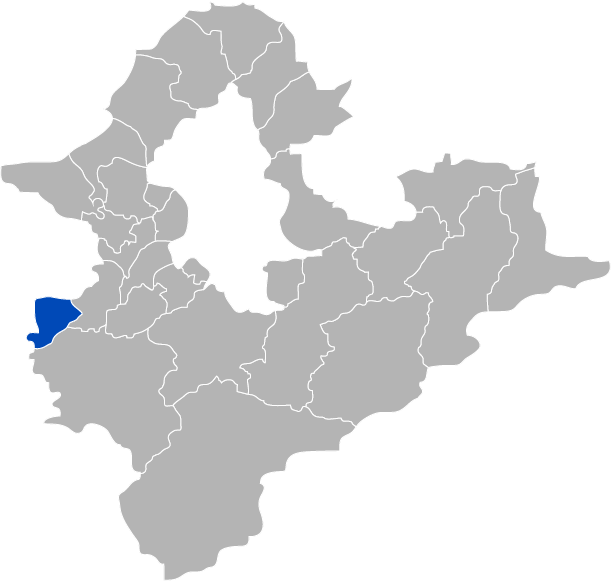
- Location of Yingge in New Taipei City
- Coordinates: 24°57′41″N 121°20′35″E
- Country: Republic of China (Taiwan)
- Special municipality: New Taipei

Area
  - Total: 21.1248 km^{2} (8.1563 sq mi)

Population (March 2023)
  - Total: 88,555
  - Density: 4,192.0/km^{2} (10,857/sq mi)
- Time zone: UTC+8 (CST)
- ZIP code: 239
- Area code: 02
- Website: www.yingge.ntpc.gov.tw (in Chinese)

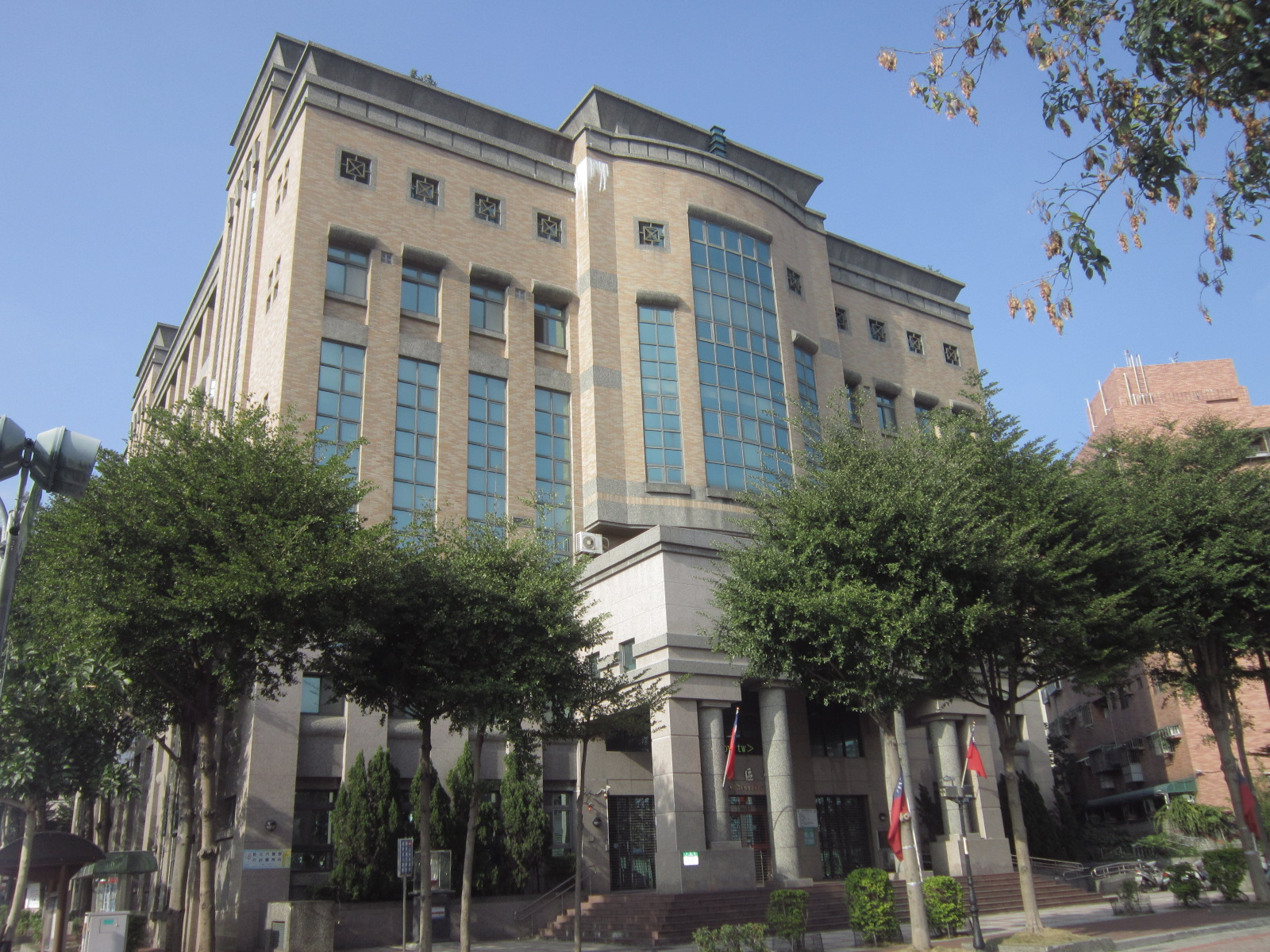
Yingge District office

Yingge District (Chinese: 鶯歌區; pinyin: Yīnggē Qū; Pe̍h-ōe-jī: Eng-ko-khu; lit. 'oriole song township') is a district located on the Dahan River in southwestern New Taipei City in northern Taiwan. It is famous for the production of porcelain and an abundance of art studios and shops.

== Name ==
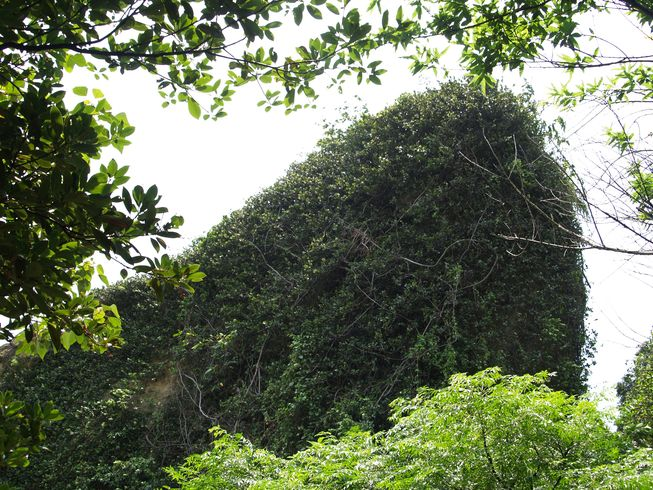
Yingge Rock, after which the district is named

On the northern side of Yingge lies a formation that went by the names of 鸚哥石 (Parrot Stone), 鷹哥石 (Eagle Brother Stone), and 鶯哥石 (Golden oriole or Warbler Brother Stone). The last stone is where the current name of the district derives from. The modern name "Yingge" (鶯歌) literally means "Warbler Song" in Chinese.

According to legend, the rock formation produced a miasma that disoriented, sickened, and sometimes killed passers-by. One day, General Koxinga led his army past the rock. When they were caught in the miasma, he ordered his cannon to fire against the rock. When the neck of the stone eagle was broken, the miasma lifted and the troops could continue on their march.

== History ==
According to legend, by 1684, the Yingge area already had Hakka migrants who specialized in cultivating tea. According to the locals, the history of ceramics in Yingge began 200 years ago when Wu An (吳鞍) immigrated from Guangzhou to Yingge to become the first potter in the area. Later, Chen Kun (陳昆), a brick maker, moved to the area and the two strived to make Yingge into the centre of Taiwan's ceramics industry.

In 1920, Yingge Stone Village (鶯歌石庄) was renamed to Yingge Village (鶯歌庄). In 1940, the village was promoted to Yingge Street (鶯歌街), and in 1945 was changed to Yingge Small Town (鶯歌鎮). On August 1, 1946, seventeen urban villages (里) were divided from Yingge Township and made into Shulin Township. In 2010, Yingge Township was upgraded to Yingge District along with the upgrade of Taipei County. Today, Yingge is the largest centre for ceramic production in Taiwan, with over 800 ceramic-related businesses in the area.

== Education ==
- New Taipei Municipal Yingge Vocational High School
- Yingge Junior High School
- Yingge Elementary School

== Tourist attractions ==
- New Taipei City Yingge Ceramics Museum — a large museum exhibiting ceramic culture in Taiwan
- Yingge Ceramics Old Street (also known as Yingge Old Street, in Chinese: 鶯歌老街) — a pedestrian shopping street specializing in ceramic arts, pottery, porcelain, and other related products
- Yingge Rock — the eagle-shaped rock that gives Yingge its name
- New Taipei City Art Museum

== Transportation ==
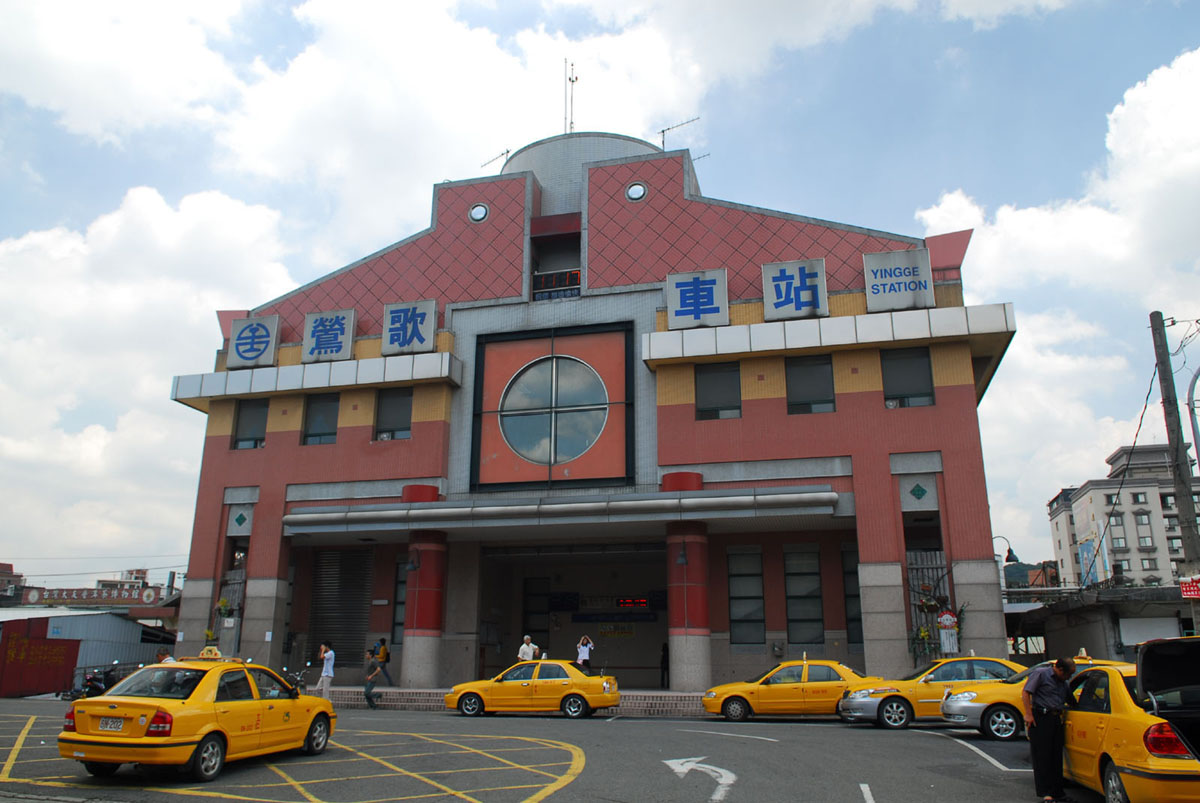
Yingge Station

The best mode of transportation for visiting Yingge is the train from Taipei for a half-hour ride which is available every hour. From Yingge railway station, easy walking to reach Ceramic Street enables visitors to experience the small town charm and local snacks. Merchants open at 9 am, and it is recommended to arrive at 10am.

New Taipei Metro's Sanying line serves the district with five stations: Yingge Station, Ceramics Old Street, Guohua, Yongji Park, and Yingtao Fude.

== Notable natives ==
- Chang Jin-fu, Governor of Taiwan Province (2009–2010)
- Chen Ding-shinn, hepatologist

== Sister cities ==
Yingge District has the following sister cities:

- Kennewick, Washington, United States
