= New Taipei City Yingge Ceramics Museum =

Museum in Yingge, New Taipei, Taiwan

- 新北市立鶯歌陶瓷博物館
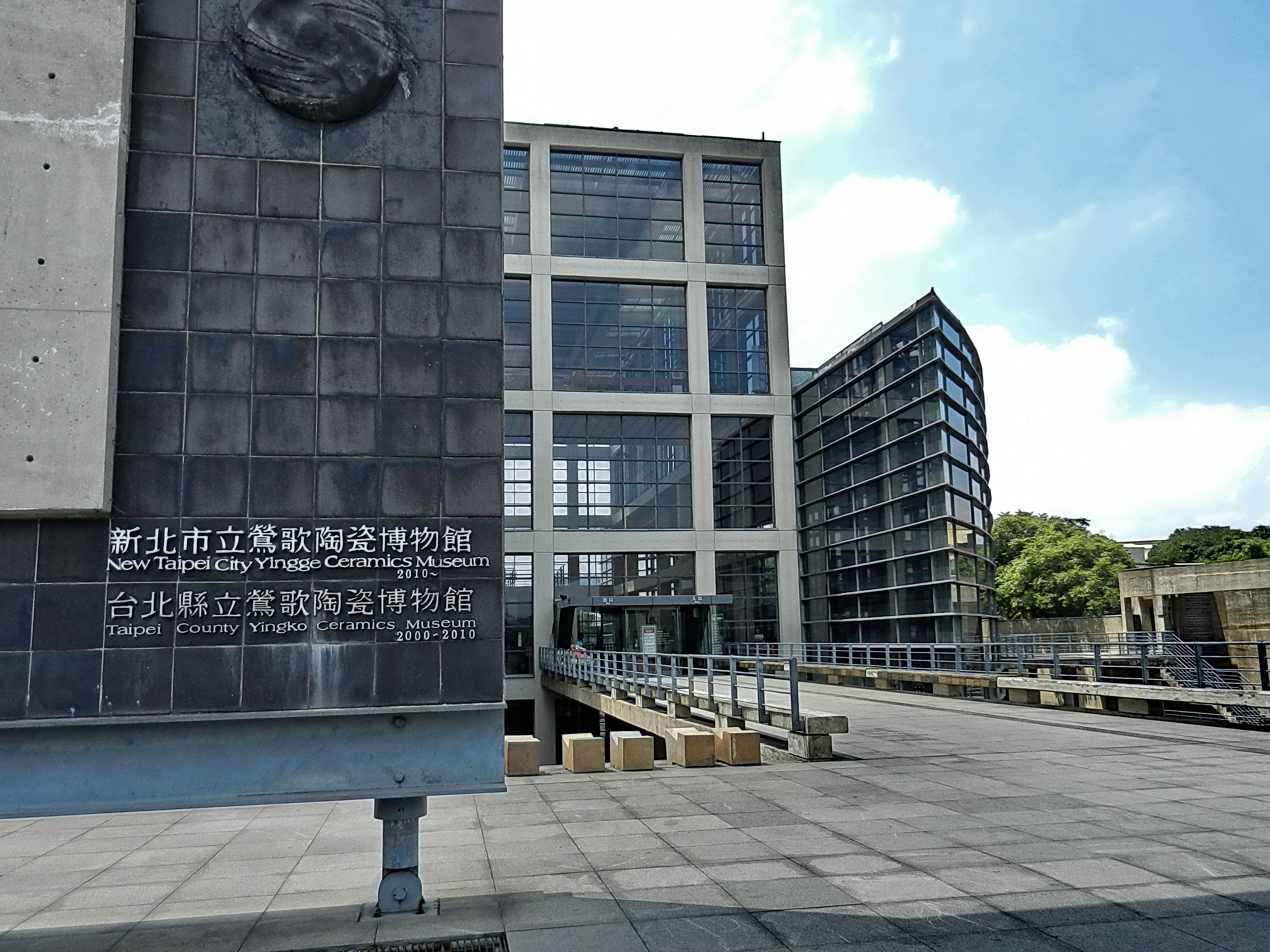
- Established: 26 November 2000
- Location: Yingge, New Taipei, Taiwan
- Coordinates: 24°56′57.5″N 121°21′7.3″E
- Type: art museum
- Visitors: 1,153,263 (2015)
- Director: Wu Hsiu-tzu
- Website: www.ceramics.ntpc.gov.tw

New Taipei City Yingge Ceramics Museum
- Traditional Chinese: 新北市立鶯歌陶瓷博物館
- Simplified Chinese: 新北市立莺歌陶瓷博物馆
Transcriptions
Standard Mandarin
- Hanyu Pinyin: Xīnběi shìlì Yīnggē táocí bówùguǎn
- Wade–Giles: Hsin^{1}-pei^{3} shih^{4}-li^{4} Ing^{1}-ko^{1} t‘ao^{2}-tz‘ŭ^{2} po^{2}-wu^{4}-kuan^{3}
- IPA: [ɕín.pèɪ ʂɨ̂.lî íŋ.kɤ́ tʰǎʊ.tsʰɨ̌ pwǒ.û.kwàn]
Hakka
- Pha̍k-fa-sṳ: Sîn-pet sṳ-li̍p Yîn-kô thò-chhṳ̀ pok-vu̍t-kón
Yue: Cantonese
- Yale Romanization: Sānbāk síhlaahp Ānggō tòuhchìh bokmahtgún
- Jyutping: san1 bak1 si5 laap6 ang1 go1 tou4 ci4 bok3 mat6 gun2
- IPA: [sɐn˥.pɐk̚˥ si˩˧.lapʰ ɐŋ˥.kɔ˥ tʰɔw˩.tsʰi˩ pɔk̚˧.mɐt̚˨.]
Southern Min
- Hokkien POJ: Sin-pak chhī-li̍p Eng-ko tô-chû phok-bu̍t-koán
- Tâi-lô: Sin-pak tshī-li̍p Eng-ko tô-tsû phok-bu̍t-kuán

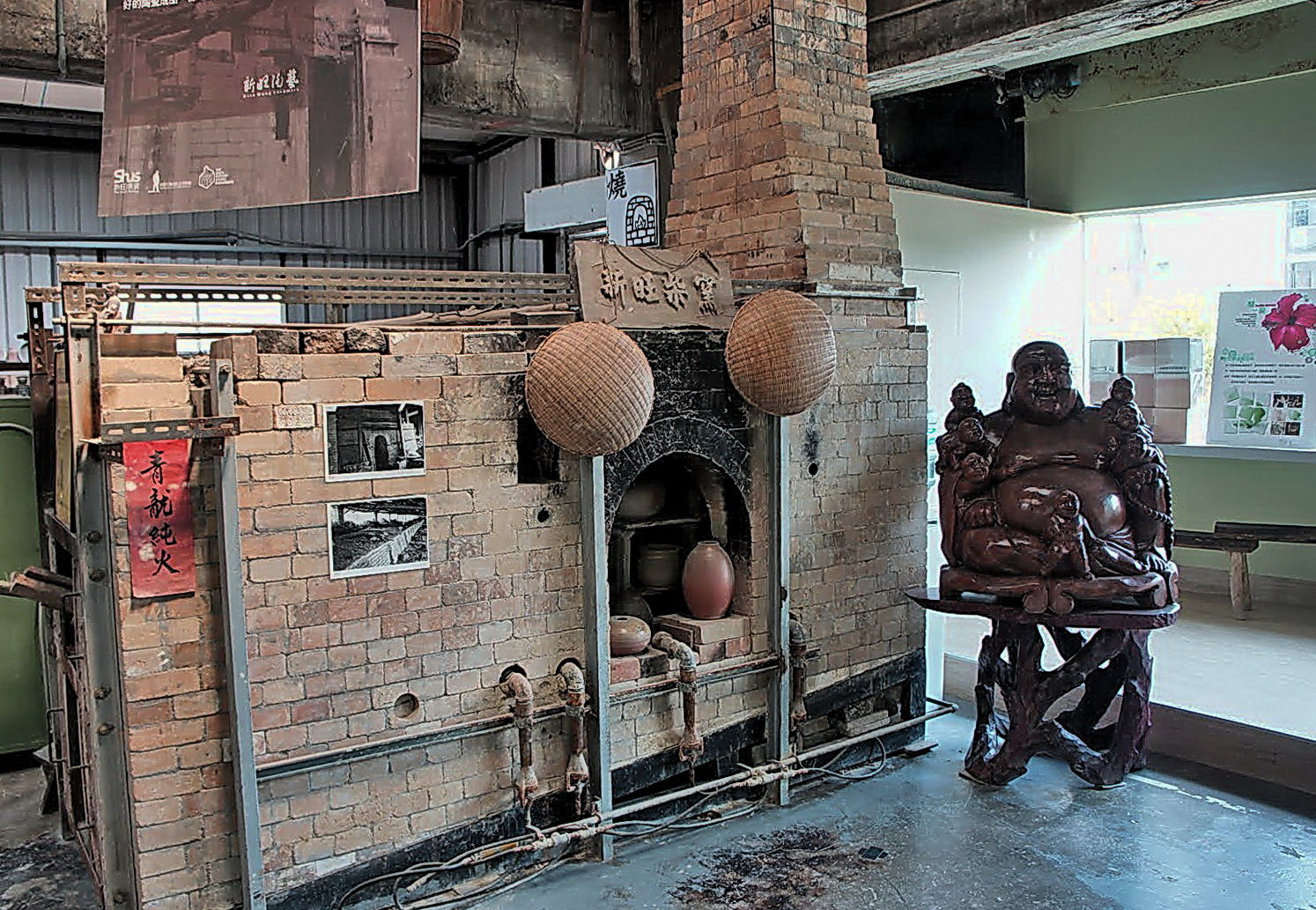
Exhibit in the Ceramics Museum

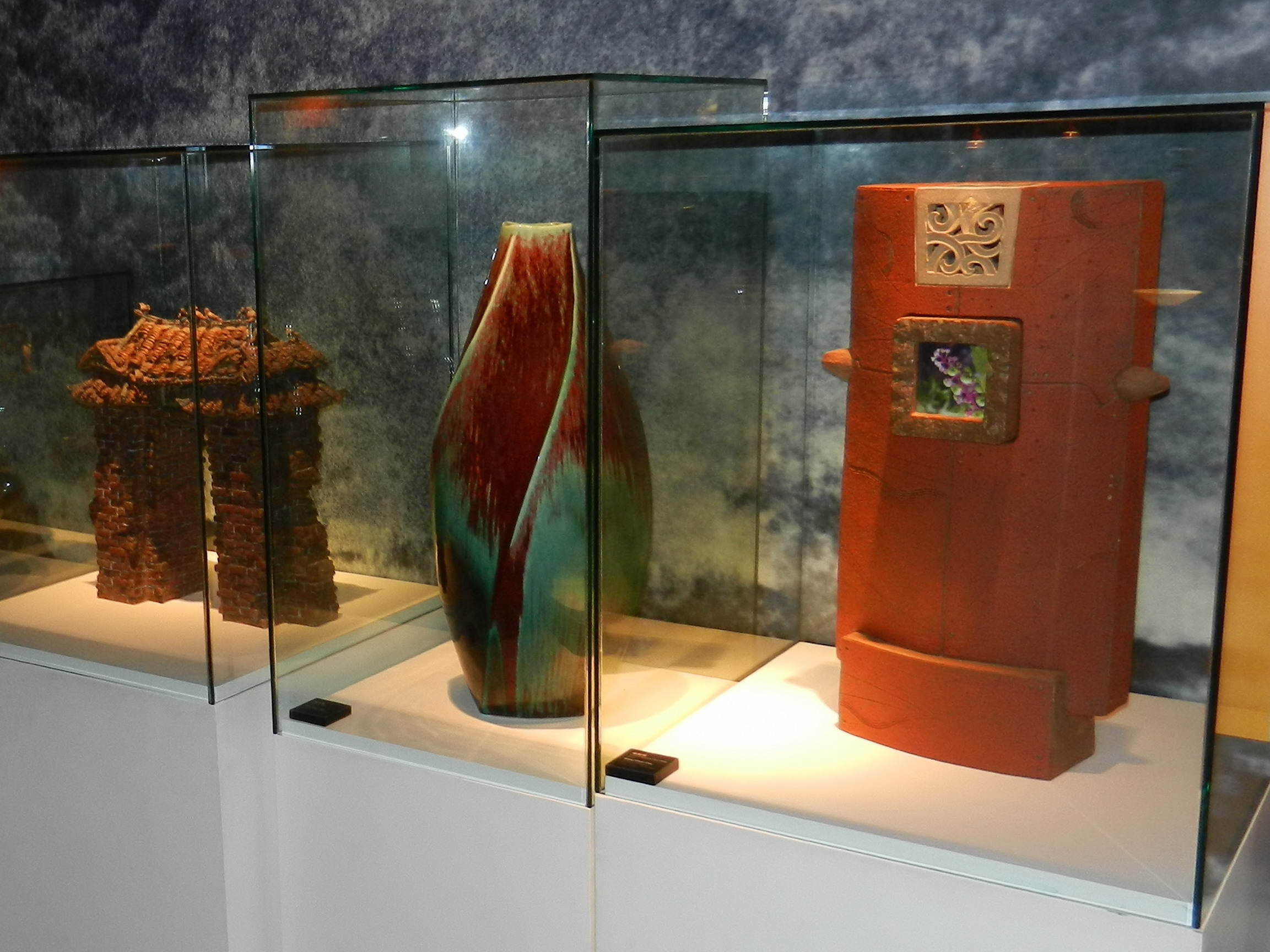
Exhibit in the Ceramics Museum

The New Taipei City Yingge Ceramics Museum (Chinese: 新北市立鶯歌陶瓷博物館) is a museum presenting ceramics located in Yingge District, New Taipei, Taiwan.

== History ==
The museum opened on 26 November 2000. In March 2016, the museum signed an agreement with Google to include its collections in the art project of Google Cultural Institute.

== Exhibitions ==
The museum houses exhibits as well as a ceramics studio. The permanent exhibits present five major themes:

1. Traditional Pottery Techniques Hall
2. Once they Were: Development of Taiwan Ceramics
3. Pottery Town: History of Yingge
4. Shuttle Through Time: Prehistoric/Aboriginal/Contemporary Ceramics
5. Future Prediction: Industrial and High-tech Ceramics

There is also an experimental pottery area for children to play with clay, and a pottery workshop for artists and experts to share experiences and thoughts.

== Transportation ==
The museum is accessible within walking distance South West from Yingge Station of Taiwan Railway.

== See also ==
- List of museums in Taiwan
