= Shanjia railway station =

Railway station in New Taipei, Taiwan

Shanjia 山佳
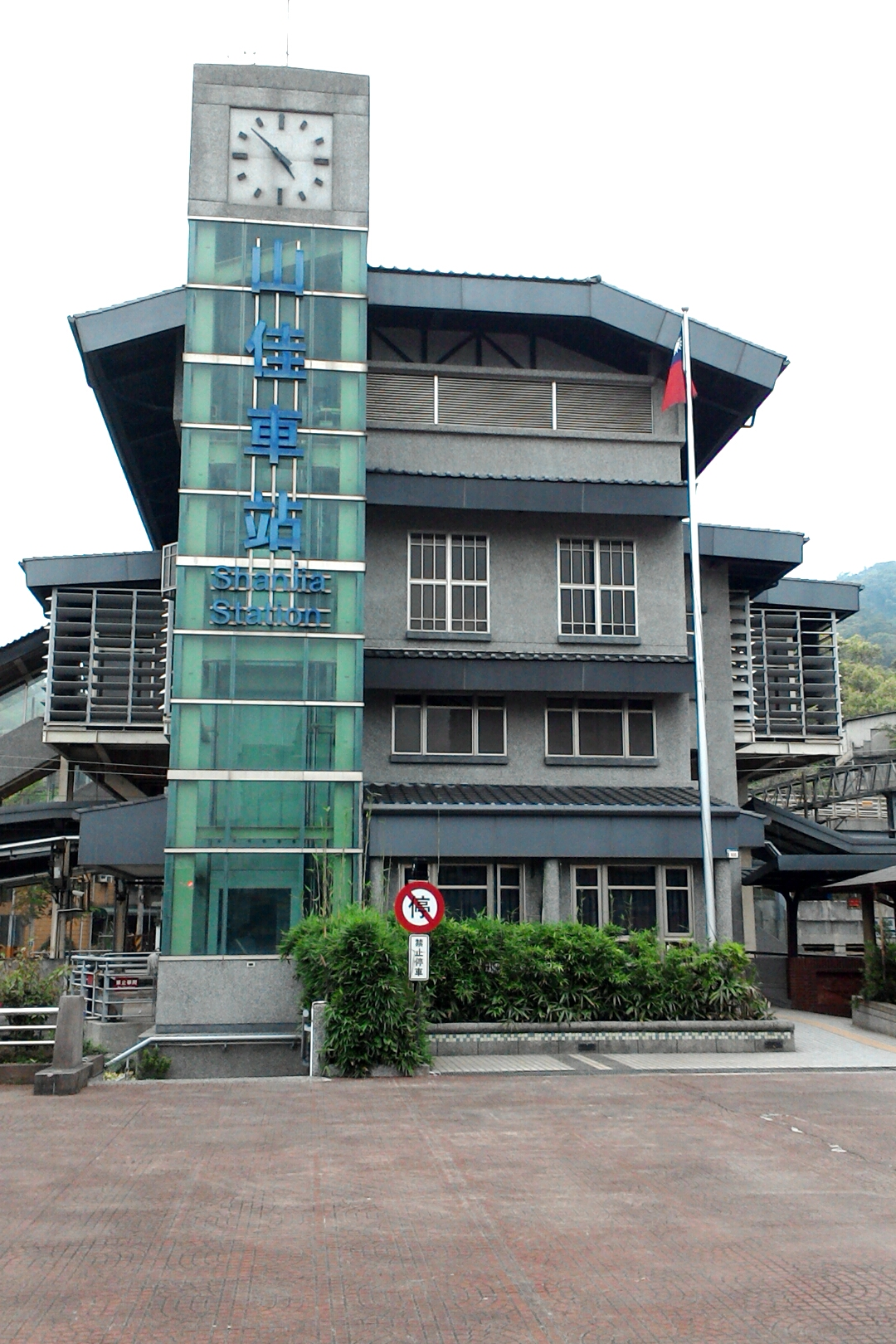

General information
- Location: No.108, Section 3, Zhongshan Rd. Shulin, New Taipei; Taiwan
- Coordinates: 24.972482°N 121.392594°E
- Operated by: Taiwan Railway Corporation
- Line: Western Trunk line (104)
- Distance: 44.8 km from Keelung
- Platforms: 2 island platforms

Construction
- Structure type: Elevated

History
- Opened: 7 October 1903

Passengers
- 3,401 daily (2024)

Services
Preceding station	Taiwan Railway	Following station
South Shulin towards Keelung	Western Trunk line	Yingge towards Kaohsiung
Location

Shanjia (traditional Chinese: 山佳車站; simplified Chinese: 山佳车站; pinyin: Shānjiā Chēzhàn) is a railway station on Taiwan Railway West Coast line located in Shulin District, New Taipei, Taiwan.

== History ==
The station was opened on 7 October 1903 as Soa-a-kha station (Chinese: 山仔腳停車場).

In 2011, the old station was closed and all of the trains were moved to the new building.

The station serves the community of Shanjia, located in Shulin. It is only served by local trains.

== Around the station ==
- Shulin Refuse Incineration Plant (1.6km to the southwest)
- Shanzijiao Park (150m to the southeast)
- Shulin Railroad Scenery Park (樹林鐵道地景公園）(300m to the northeast)
- Lujiaoxi Park (400m to the east)
- Shanjia Riverside Park (700m to the southwest)

== See also ==
- List of railway stations in Taiwan
