= Shulin District =

District in New Taipei, Taiwan

Shulin 樹林區
- District
- Shulin District
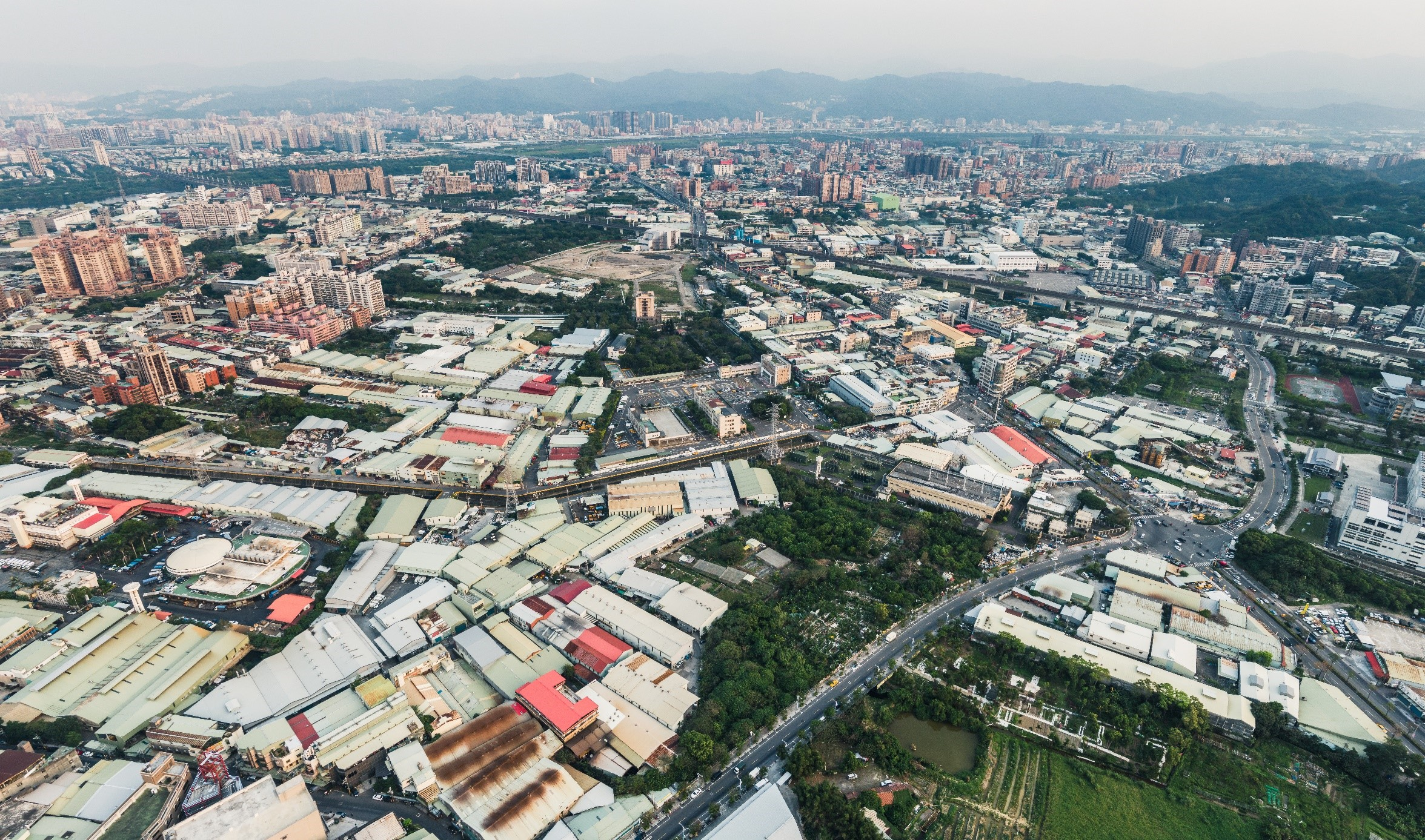

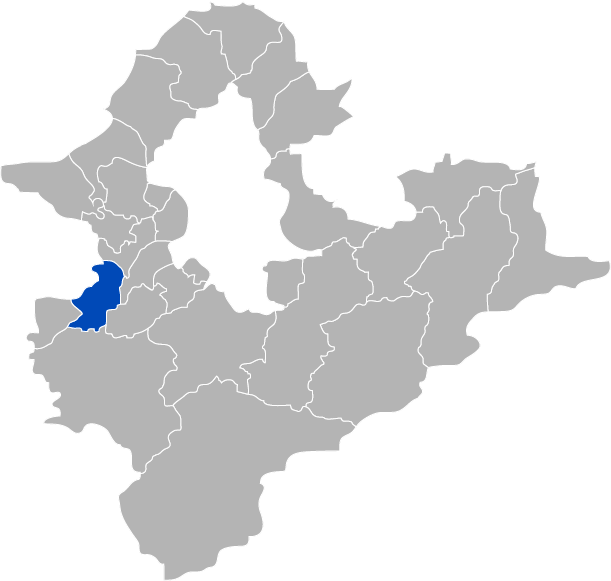
- Shulin District in New Taipei City
- Coordinates: 24°59′N 121°25′E
- Country: Republic of China (Taiwan)
- Special municipality: New Taipei City
- Urban villages: 42

Government
  - Leader (區長): Chen Chi-Cheng (陳奇正)

Area
  - Total: 33.1288 km^{2} (12.7911 sq mi)

Population (March 2023)
  - Total: 180,340
  - Density: 5,443.6/km^{2} (14,099/sq mi)
- Time zone: UTC+8 (National Standard Time)
- Postal code: 238
- Website: www.shulin.ntpc.gov.tw (in Chinese)

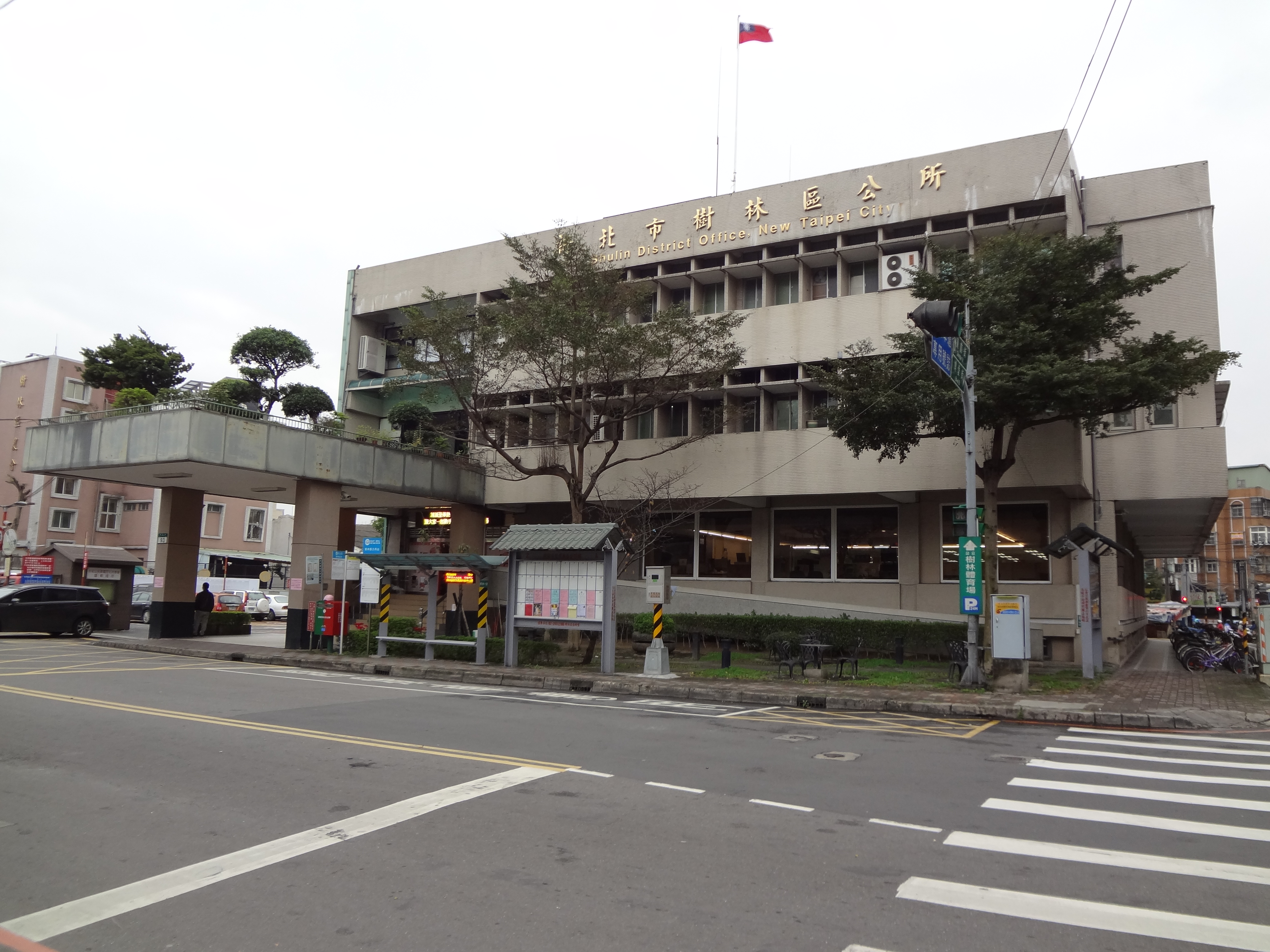
Shulin District office

Shulin District (Chinese: 樹林區; pinyin: Shùlín Qū; Pe̍h-ōe-jī: Chhiū-nâ-khu; lit. 'forest district') is an inner city district in southwestern New Taipei City, Taiwan.

== History ==
On August 1, 1946, seventeen urban villages (里) were divided from Yingge Township and made into Shulin Township (樹林鎮).

Shulin was upgraded to a county-administered city of Taipei County on 4 October 1999 from an urban township, and to a district of New Taipei City on 25 December 2010.

== Administrative divisions ==
Shulin District administers forty-two urban villages:

- Sanxing (三興里), Sanfu (三福里), Sanduo (三多里), Sanlong (三龍里), Qiangliao (獇寮里), Guangxing (光興里), Jinliao (金寮里), Tandi (潭底里), Wenlin (文林里), Baoan (保安里), Zunan (圳安里), Zunfu (圳福里), Zunmin (圳民里), Zunsheng (圳生里), Shude (樹德里), Shufu (樹福里), Shuxi (樹西里), Shuxing (樹興里), Shuren (樹人里), Yuying (育英里), Shunan (樹南里), Ponei (坡內里), Shutung (樹東里), Shubei (樹北里), Pengfu (彭福里), Heping (和平里), Pengxing (彭興里), Pengcuo (彭厝里), Datong (大同里), Zhonghua (中華里), Taishun (太順里), Tungsheng (東昇里), Tungyang (東陽里), Tungshan (東山里), Shanjia (Shanchia, 山佳里), Zhongshan (中山里), Leshan (樂山里), Ganyuan (柑園里), Xiyuan (西園里), Nanyuan (南園里), Tungyuan (東園里) and Beiyuan (北園里) Village.

== Religion ==
Baosheng Dadi is the most commonly accepted deity in Shulin District. The most important holiday in Shulin is the birthday of Baosheng Dadi, which falls on the fifteenth day of the third month of the Chinese lunar calendar.

The people of Ganyuan celebrate a festival for Baoyi daifu (保儀大夫) on the first day of the ninth month of the lunar calendar.

A hog is sacrificed every year on the sixth day of the first month of the lunar calendar.

== Tourist Attractions ==
- Datong Mountain
- Lujiao Creek Wetlands

== Infrastructures ==
- Shulin Refuse Incineration Plant

== Transportation ==
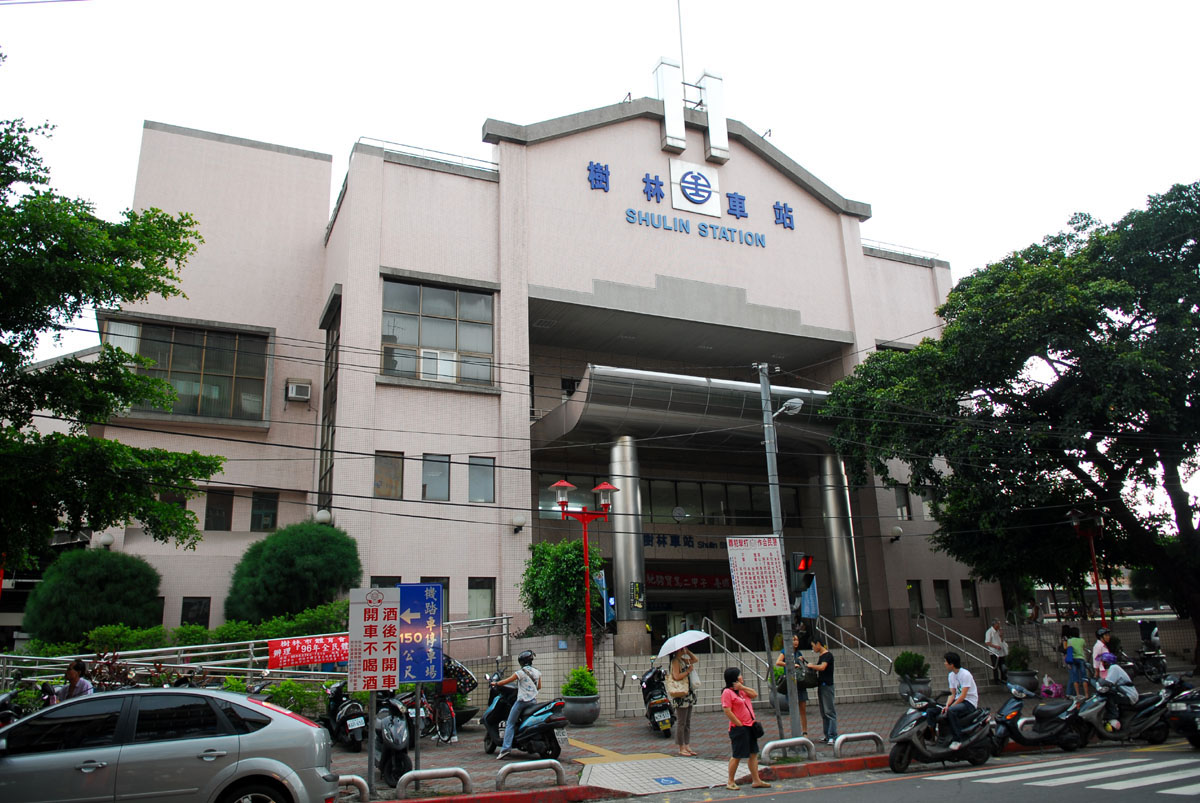
Shulin Rail Station

- TR Shanjia Station
- TR Shulin Station
- TR South Shulin Station

== Notable natives ==
- Sung Yu-chi, Taekwondo athlete

== See also ==
- New Taipei City
