= A Collection of Eastern Wall Pavilion =

A Collection of Eastern Wall Pavilion is a classical poetry collection written by Cheng Ching (Chinese: 鄭經), the King of Yanping, during the Kingdom of Tungning (臺灣明鄭時期) in Taiwan. It is the first work entirely centered around Taiwan as its theme. During Cheng’s reign, he built a garden called "Chienyuan” (潛苑) and referred to himself as the “Master of ”Chienyuan” (潛苑). Within Chienyuan, there was “Eastern Wall Pavilion”(東璧樓), which inspired the name A Collection of Eastern Wall Pavilion.

The original book is preserved in the National Archives of Japan and copies are located at the Kyoto University’s Institute for Research in Humanities in Japan, Princeton University's Gest Library in the United States, National Central Library’s Center for Chinese Studies in Taiwan, and Academia Sinica’s Fu Ssu-nien Library in Taiwan.

In 1994, Hung-lam Chu (Chinese: 朱鴻林), scholar of the history of the Ming Dynasty, published an article: The poetry collection and the poems of Cheng Ching. By examining life description in the "Preface” by Cheng himself and the final stamp seal "Shih Tien Shih” (式天氏), he confirmed that Cheng Ching indeed wrote the works in A Collection of Eastern Wall Pavilion. This also supported the claim that "Master of Chienyuan” (潛苑) was one of Cheng Ching's pseudonyms.

A Collection of Eastern Wall Pavilion mainly expresses “thoughts of beauty,” conveying concerns about his homeland (China) and longing for the Ming dynasty emperors. The collection consists of eight volumes with around 480 poems, which is a larger quantity compared to other writers of the same period—the Kingdom of Tungning, even surpassing Shen Guangwen (Chinese: 沈光文). Each volume is organized chronologically based on the date of composition. In terms of subject, love and nature are the main focus, followed by war and objects. In addition, the collection combines romance and aspirations, providing a glimpse into Cheng’s thoughts and feelings during his time in Taiwan, offering later generations an understanding of his historical deeds and personality.

Commenting on Cheng's poetry, Peng Kuo-Tung (Chinese: 彭國棟) said, "His words are thoughtful, not merely imitating the forms of the Six Dynasties. It is being heard that he continued to write poetry during his reign, but the collection only contains this certain amount, which suggests that many were lost." On the other hand, Gong Hsien-tsung (Chinese: 龔顯宗) said, “His poems are sleek and elegant, and some displayed bold spirits. Although he studied the Tang style, his work had the flavor of the Chin dynasty. Also, among the writings of royal authors, he refrained from speaking in superficial or deceitful terms and was better at revealing his personality and true emotions.”
