= Shanhua District =

Coordinates: 23°08′N 120°18′E

Shanhua 善化區 Zenka
- District
- Shanhua District
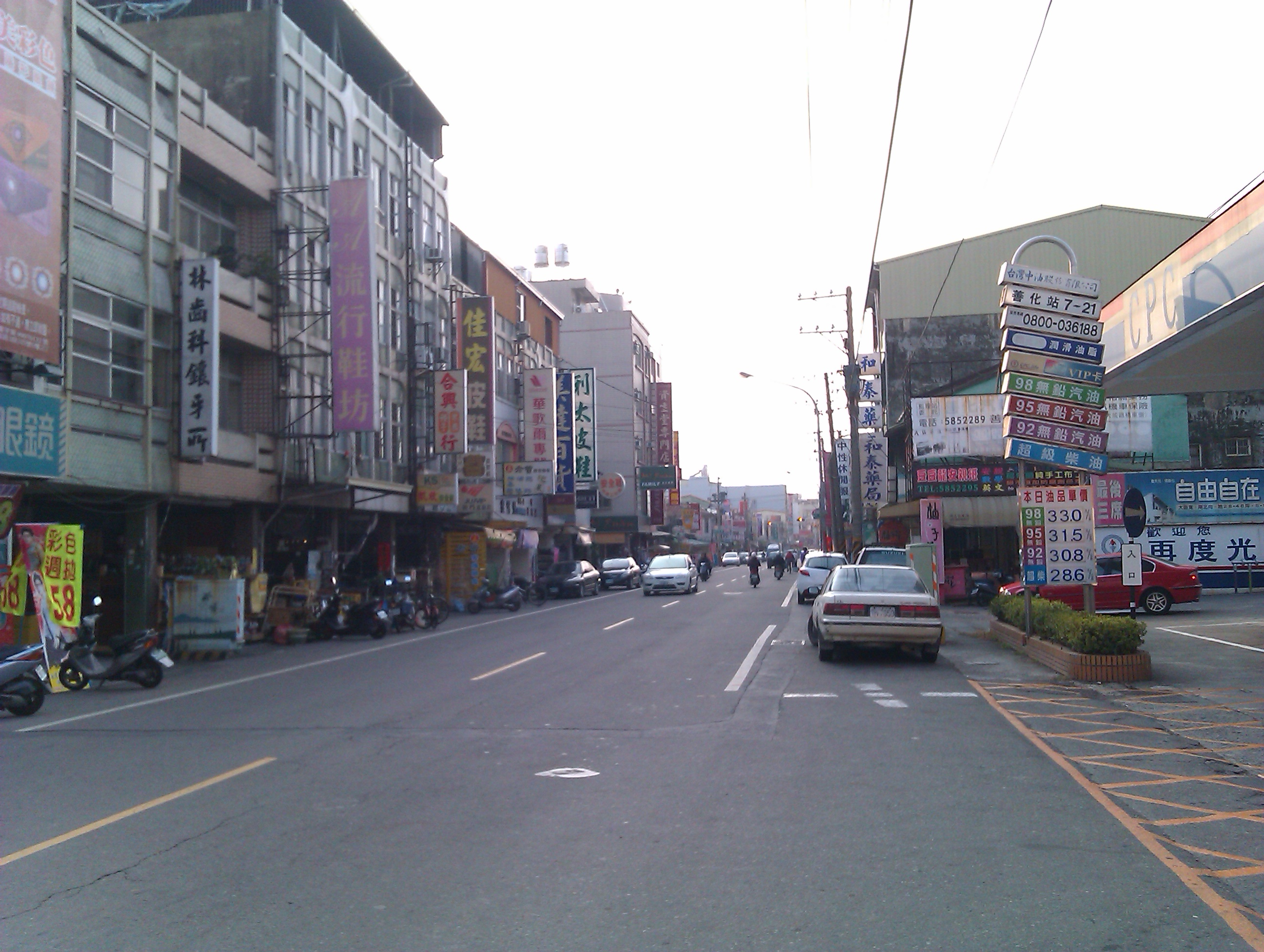

- Location of Shanhua District in Tainan
- Country: Taiwan
- Special municipality: Tainan

Area
  - Total: 55.31 km^{2} (21.36 sq mi)

Population (May 2022)
  - Total: 51,526
  - Density: 931.6/km^{2} (2,413/sq mi)
- Time zone: UTC+8 (CST)
- Postal code: 741
- Website: www.shanhua.gov.tw/en/

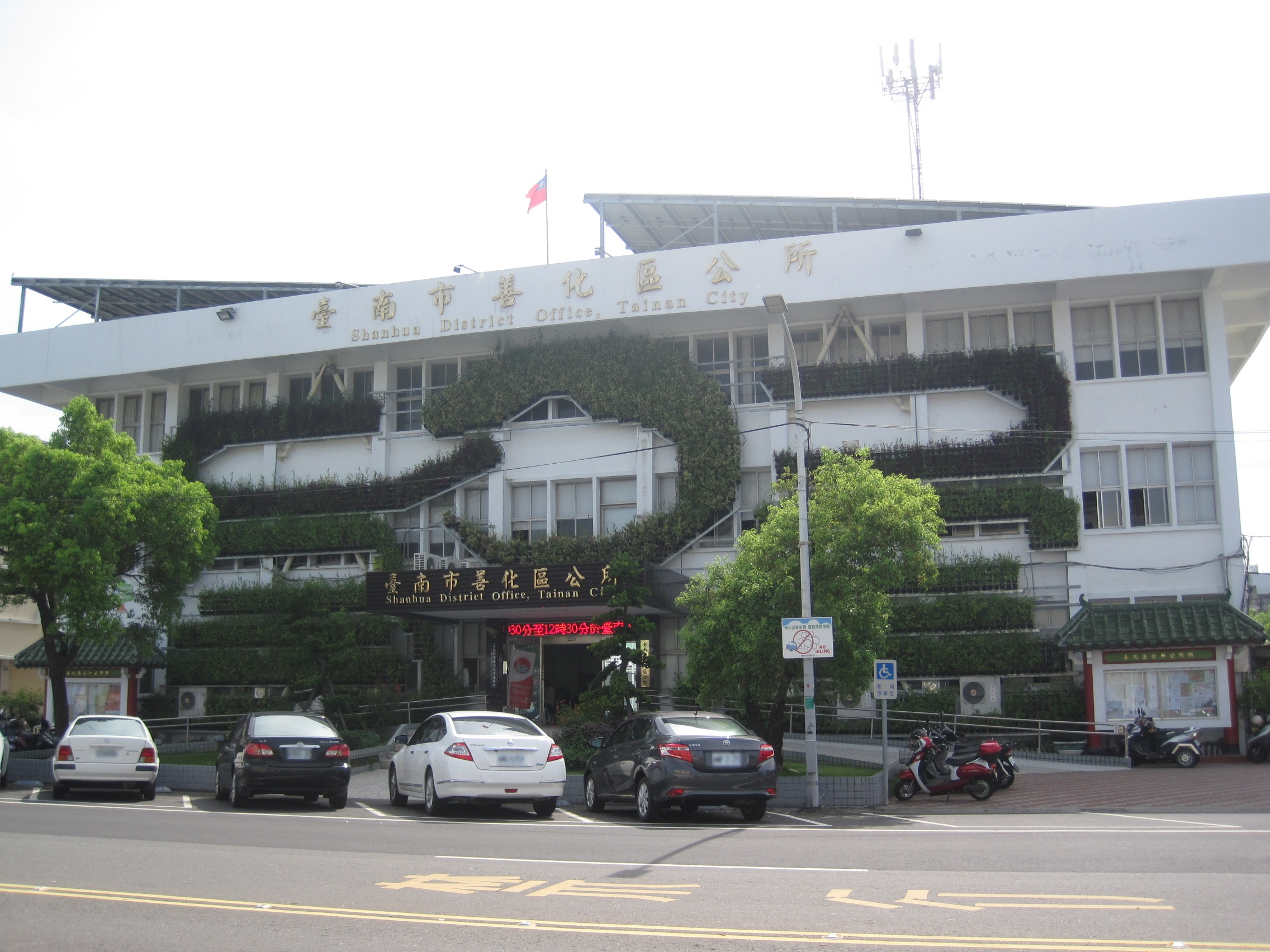
Shanhua District office

Shanhua District (Chinese: 善化區; pinyin: Shànhuà Qū; Wade–Giles: Shan-hua; Pe̍h-ōe-jī: Siān-hoà-khu; lit. 'amelioration') is a suburban district of Tainan, Taiwan. Until 25 December 2010, it was an urban township in the dissolved Tainan County, which is now merged with the original Tainan City to form a single special municipality.

== History ==
Shanhua was inhabited by the Taiwanese aboriginal tribe of Siraya, who called it Bakaloan (transliterated into Chinese: 目加溜灣; Pe̍h-ōe-jī: Ba̍k-ka-liù-oan) (see also Anding, bordering to the southwest). It was one of the four major towns established by the tribe.

In 1625, the Dutch East India Company was driven back by the aborigines while trying to collect bamboo. The Dutch, however, were able to conquer the town in 1635, and started setting up schools and churches in the area, calling the place Tevoran (see modern-day Yujing). They encouraged Han settlers to cultivate the place.

In the Siege of Fort Zeelandia, Koxinga drove the Europeans out of Taiwan. Under the Kingdom of Tungning, Bakaloan was governed as Sian-hoa Village (善化里; Siān-hoà-lí) of Tien-hsing County (天興縣). According to the Shanhua Urban Plan Total Review Report, the old name for the region is Oanli (灣里街; Oan-lí-ke) before it was changed back again to Shanhua (Japanese: 善化, Hepburn: Zenka) under Japanese rule in 1920. In 1940, the village was upgraded to Zenka Town (善化街), Shinka District (新化郡), Tainan Prefecture.

=== Republic of China ===
After the handover of Taiwan from Japan to the Republic of China in 1945, Shanhua was organized as an urban township of Tainan County. On 25 December 2010, Tainan County was merged with Tainan City and Shanhua was upgraded to a district of the city.

== Politics ==
Until 25 December 2010, the chief executive of Shanhua Township was the popularly elected magistrate (Chinese: 鎮長). The township also had a council (Chinese: 善化鎮民代表會) consisting of councillors elected from the township.

Since the current administrative arrangement came into effect on the above date, a director (Chinese: 區長) appointed by the mayor of Tainan City is in charge of the administration of the newly created district.

== Administrative divisions ==
The district consists of Tungguan, Zuojia, Guangwen, Wenchang, Nanguan, Wenzheng, Hujia, Hucuo, Shinai, Ximei, Liufen, Liude, Tianliao, Niuzhuang, Jiabei, Jianan, Xiaoxin, Dingjie, Changlong and Liantan Village.

== Economy ==
Shanhua has an agricultural economy. Major products of the township include rice, sugarcane, strawberry, and watermelon.

In 1973, the Asian Vegetable Research and Development Center (AVRDC) was co-established by eleven nations including the United States, Japan, and the Republic of China (Taiwan). It has the goal to improve agricultural techniques. The headquarters of the organization is located in the southern part of Shanhua and is the first and only headquarters of an international organization located in Taiwan.

The National Science Council of the Executive Yuan founded the Tainan Science Park based in Sinshih. Part of the park lies within Shanhua and brings job opportunities to local residents.

== Notable natives ==
- Shen Guangwen (沈光文) (1612–1688), scholar, poet, educator and the founder of Taiwanese literature. Also called the Taiwanese Confucius.
- Huang Ta-chou (黃大洲) (1936) Taiwan politician, The former mayor of Taipei, chairman of the Chinese Taipei Olympic committee

== Tourist attractions ==
=== Qing-An Gong ===
The Qing-An Gong (simplified Chinese: 庆安宫; traditional Chinese: 慶安宮; pinyin: Qìng-ān gōng) is a temple, which is almost 300 years old, dedicated to goddess Matsu. According to oral tradition, the Dutch set up a Dutch-language school here when they ruled Taiwan.

== Transportation ==
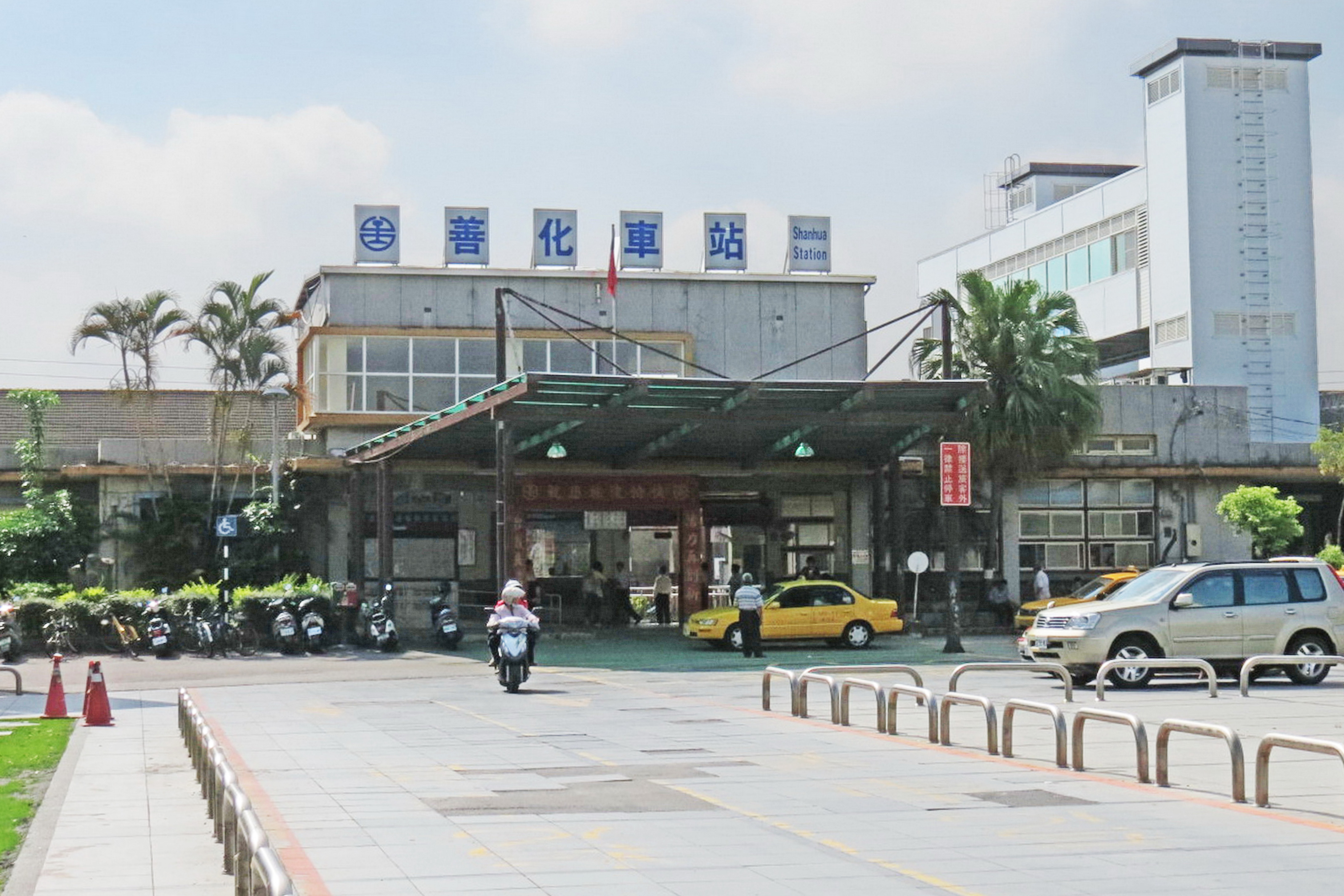
TRA Shanhua Station

- Taiwan Railway
  - Shanhua Station
- Formosa Freeway
  - Shanhua Interchange
- Provincial Highway No.1
