= National Museum of Prehistory =

National Museum of Prehistory may refer to:

- National Museum of Prehistory (France), in Les Eyzies, France
- National Museum of Prehistory (Taiwan), in Taitung, Taiwan
  - Museum of Archaeology, Tainan Branch of National Museum of Prehistory, a branch of the above museum in Tainan, Taiwan
- Pigorini National Museum of Prehistory and Ethnography, in Rome, Italy
