= Shanhua railway station =

Railway station in Tainan, Taiwan

Shanhua Station 善化車站
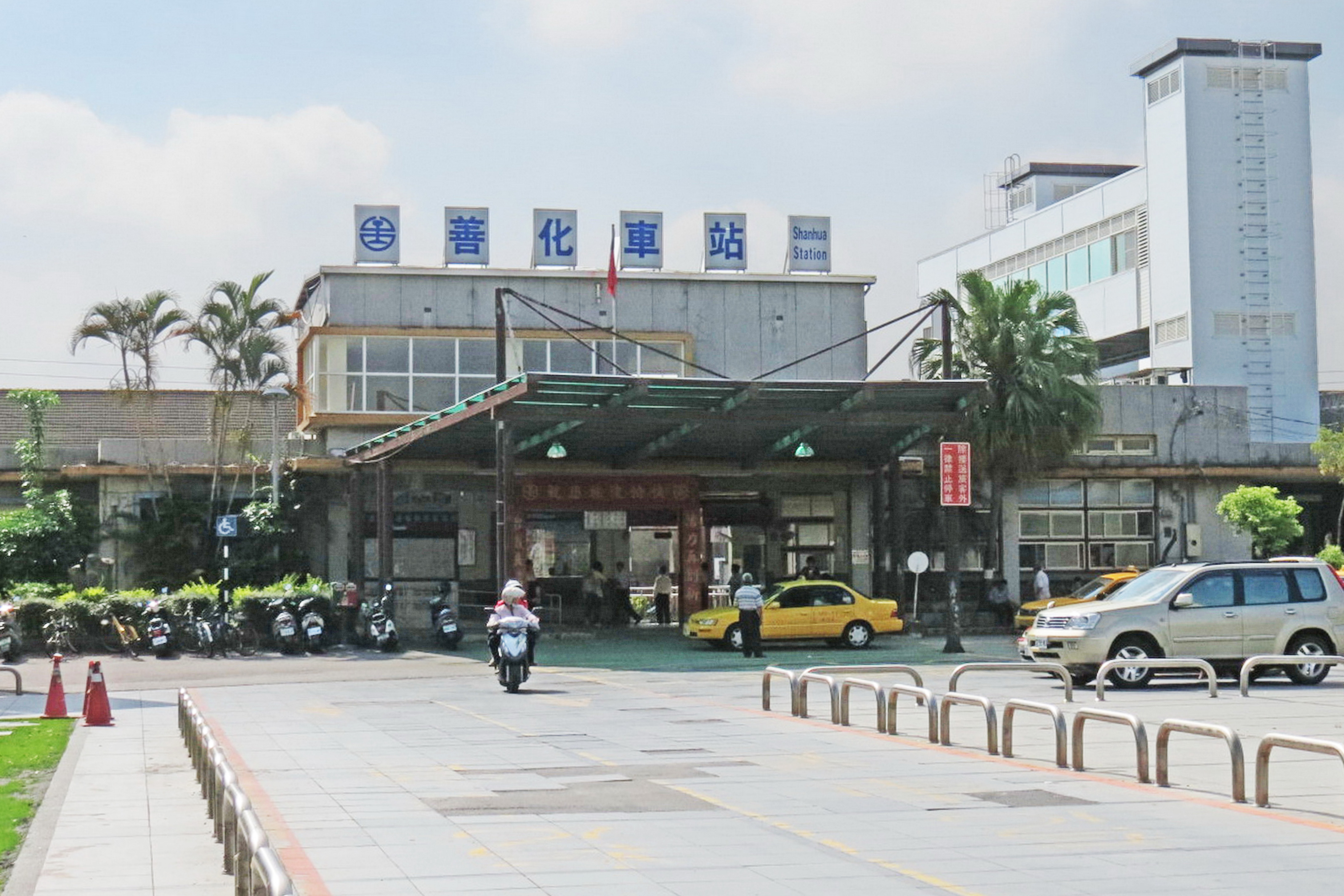

General information
- Location: Shanhua, Tainan, Taiwan
- Coordinates: 23°08′00.1″N 120°18′24.2″E
- System: Train station
- Owner: Taiwan Railway Corporation
- Operator: Taiwan Railway Corporation
- Line: Western Trunk line
- Train operators: Taiwan Railway Corporation

History
- Opened: 15 May 1901
Location

Shanhua (traditional Chinese: 善化車站; simplified Chinese: 善化车站; pinyin: Shànhuà Chēzhàn) is a railway station on Taiwan Railway West Coast line located in Shanhua District, Tainan, Taiwan.

== History ==
The station was opened on 15 May 1901.

== Nearby stations ==
Taiwan Railways Administration
Balin ⇐ West Coast line ⇒ Nanke

== See also ==
- List of railway stations in Taiwan
