= CTBC University of Technology =

University in Tainan, Taiwan

Coordinates: 23.0653°N 120.2947°E

- 中信科技大學
- Type: Private
- Established: 1968 (as Far East Junior College of Technology); August 2006 (as FEU); 2024 (as CTBC Tech)
- Location: Sinshih, Tainan, Taiwan
- Website: www.feu.edu.tw

CTBC University of Technology
- Traditional Chinese: 遠東科技大學
Transcriptions
Standard Mandarin
- Hanyu Pinyin: Yuǎndōng Kējì Dàxué
Southern Min
- Hokkien POJ: Oán-tang Kho-ki Tāi-ha̍k

CTBC University of Technology (CTBC Tech; Chinese: 中信科技大學) is a private university in Sinshih District, Tainan, Taiwan. The university has 4 colleges, 20 departments, and 6 research institutes. It enrolls about 10,000 students.

== History ==
CTBC Tech was established in 1968 as the Far East Junior College of Technology. In August 1999, the school was promoted and officially renamed Far East College with Nai-chang Wang serving as president. To comply with the promotion and to help students develop wholesome character, the Humanities Education Center of Far East College was established. In August 2006, the college was granted university status and the name was changed to Far East University. In 2020, the university had an enrollment rate of less than 60%.

In 2024, FEU was acquired by CTBC Financial Holding, a well-known Taiwanese enterprise group, and renamed CTBC University of Technology (CTBC Tech).

== Academics ==
CTBC Tech offers a wide range of undergraduate and graduate programs across seven colleges: College of Humanities, College of Social Sciences, College of Management, College of Foreign Languages, College of Information and Engineering, College of Nursing, and College of Medicine.

The university also offers a number of interdisciplinary programs, including the International Master of Business Administration (IMBA) program, which is taught entirely in English.

== Faculties ==
- College of Engineering
- College of Hospitality and Leisure
- College of Management and Design

== Transportation ==
The university is accessible within walking distance South East from Xinshi Station of Taiwan Railway.

== See also ==
- CTBC Business School
- List of universities in Taiwan
