= Longtian railway station =

Railway station located in Tainan, Taiwan

Longtian Station 隆田車站
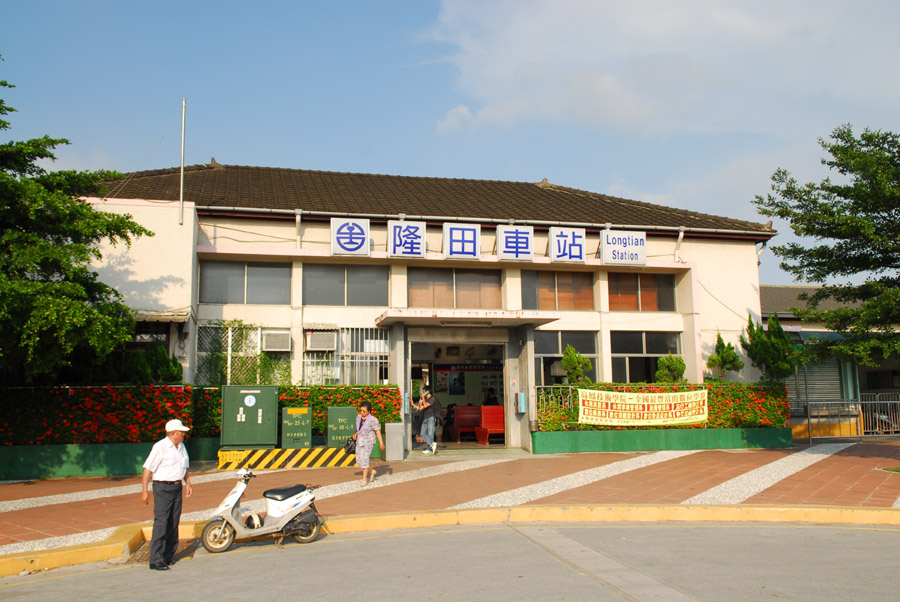

Chinese name
- Traditional Chinese: 隆田車站
Transcriptions
Standard Mandarin
- Hanyu Pinyin: Lóngtián Chēzhàn
- Bopomofo: ㄌㄨㄥˊ ㄊㄧㄢˊ ㄔㄜ ㄓㄢˋ

General information
- Location: Guantian, Tainan, Taiwan
- Coordinates: 23°11′33.8″N 120°19′09.5″E
- System: Taiwan Railway railway station
- Line: West Coast line
- Distance: 327.4 km to Keelung
- Platforms: 2 island platforms

Construction
- Structure type: At-grade

Other information
- Station code: 170

History
- Opened: 20 April 1902

Passengers
- 2017: 567,207 per year
- Rank: 74

Services
Preceding station	Taiwan Railway	Following station
Linfengying towards Keelung	Western Trunk line	Balin towards Pingtung
Location

Longtian railway station (Chinese: 隆田車站; pinyin: Lóngtián Chēzhàn) is a railway station located in Guantian District, Tainan, Taiwan. It is located on the West Coast line and is operated by Taiwan Railway.

== Around the station ==
- Jacana Ecological Education Park
