= Balin railway station =

Railway station in Guantian, Tainan, Taiwan

Balin Station 拔林車站
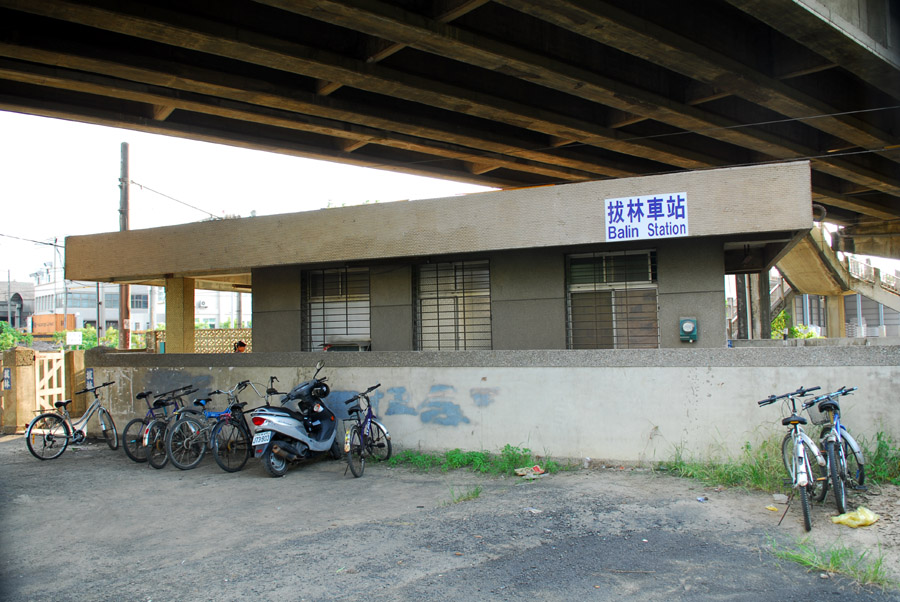

General information
- Location: Guantian, Tainan, Taiwan
- Coordinates: 23.17241°N 120.321298°E
- Owner: Taiwan Railway Corporation
- Operator: Taiwan Railway Corporation
- Line: West Coast line
- Train operators: Taiwan Railway Corporation

History
- Opened: 16 December 1901
Location

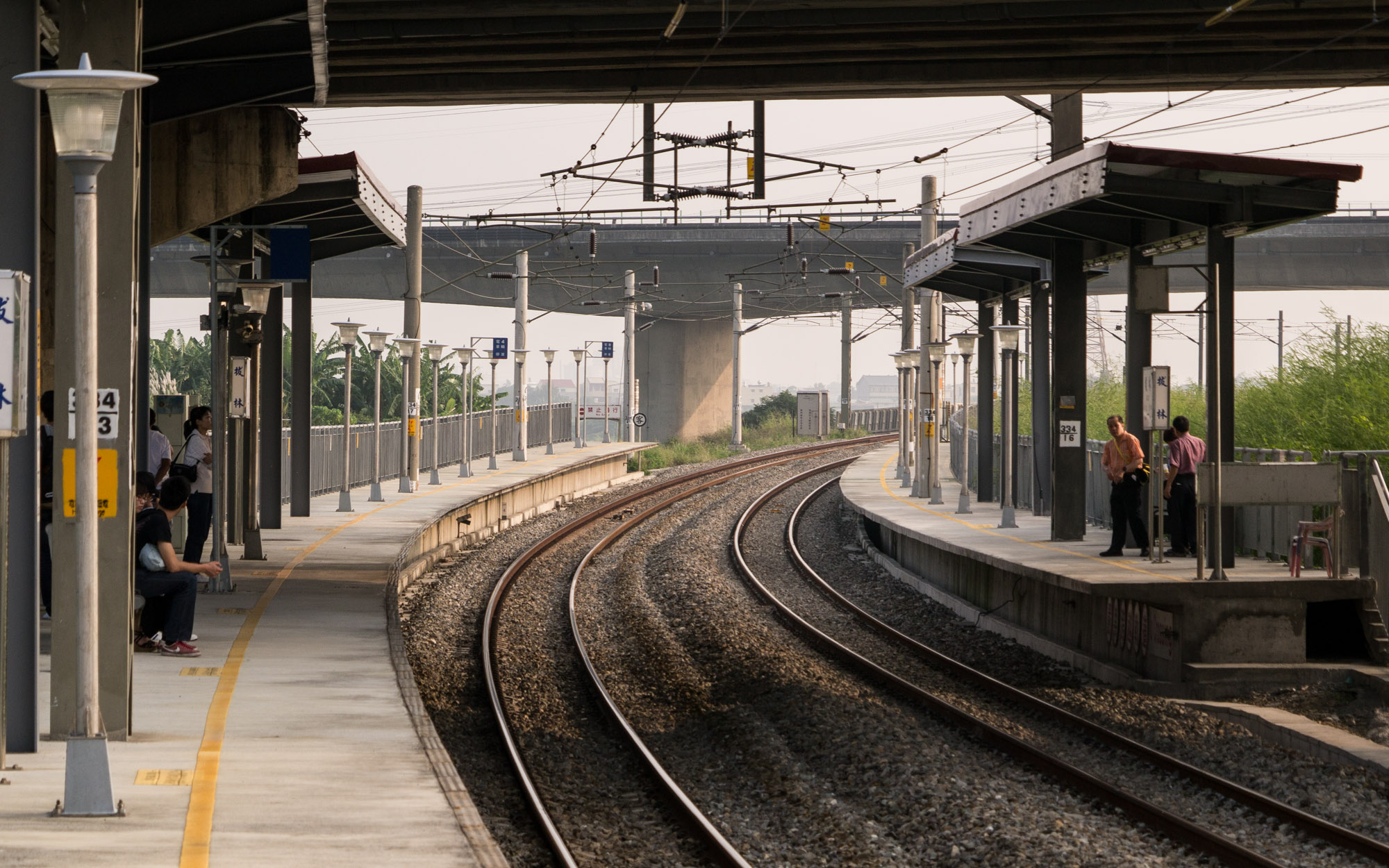
Balin station platform

Balin (traditional Chinese: 拔林車站; simplified Chinese: 拔林车站; pinyin: Bálín Chēzhàn) is a railway station on Taiwan Railway (TR) West Coast line located in Guantian District, Tainan, Taiwan.

== History ==
The station was opened on 16 December 1901.

== See also ==
- List of railway stations in Taiwan

Preceding station	Taiwan Railway	Following station
Longtian towards Keelung	Western Trunk line	Shanhua towards Pingtung
