= Xinshi railway station =

Railway station in Xinshi, Tainan, Taiwan

Coordinates: 23.0681°N 120.2900°E

Xinshi 新市
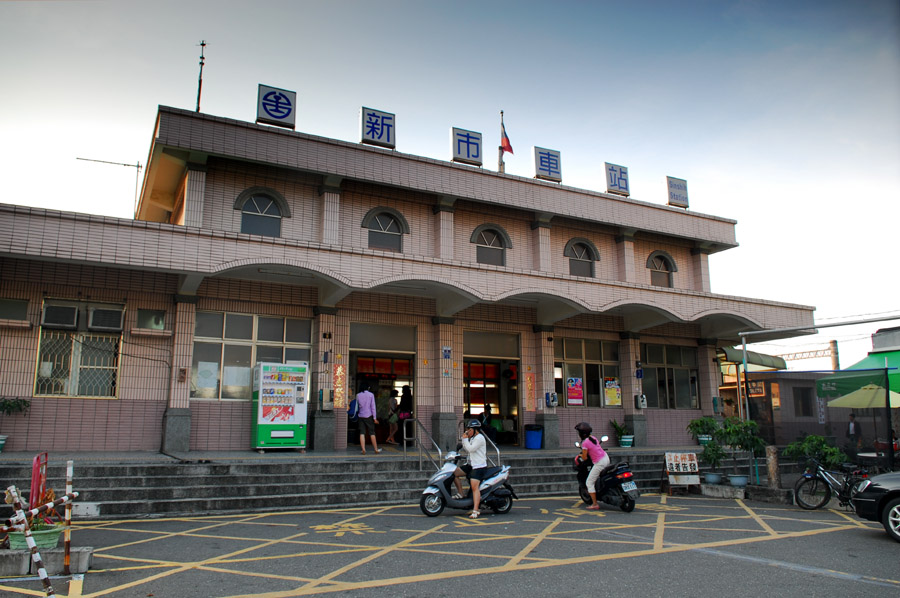

General information
- Location: Sinshih, Tainan; Taiwan
- Operated by: Taiwan Railway Corporation
- Line: Western Trunk line (173)
- Distance: 341.8 km from Keelung
- Platforms: 1 island platform, 1 side platform
- Connections: Bus stop

Construction
- Structure type: Surface
- Accessible: Yes

Other information
- Classification: 三等站 (Taiwan Railways Administration level)

History
- Opened: 15 May 1905

Passengers
- 4,412 daily (2024)
Location

Xinshi railway station
- Traditional Chinese: 新市車站
- Simplified Chinese: 新市车站
Transcriptions
Standard Mandarin
- Hanyu Pinyin: Xīnshì Chēzhàn
- Bopomofo: ㄒㄧㄣ ㄕˋ ㄔㄜ ㄓㄢˋ
- Wade–Giles: Hsin^{1}shih^{4}ch'ê^{1}chan^{4}

Xinshi (Chinese: 新市車站; pinyin: Xīnshì Chēzhàn) is a railway station on the Taiwan Railway West Coast line located in Sinshih District, Tainan, Taiwan.

== Around the station ==
- Far East University

Taiwan High Speed Rail passes through Xinshi railway station and was originally a proposed location for Tainan's HSR station, but the plan was cancelled and today's Tainan HSR station is located in the southeastern Gueiren District.

== See also ==
- List of railway stations in Taiwan

Preceding station	Taiwan Railway	Following station
Nanke towards Keelung	Western Trunk line	Yongkang towards Pingtung
