= Nanke railway station =

Railway station in Xinshi, Tainan, Taiwan

Nanke (Tainan Science Park) 南科 (臺南科學園區)
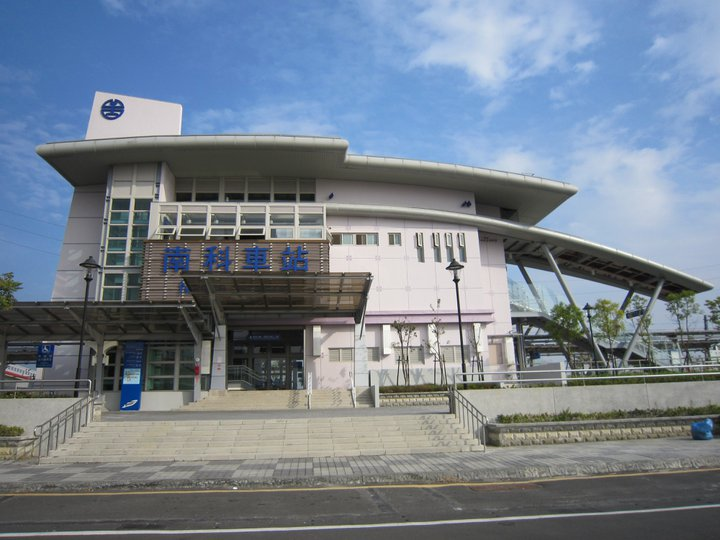

General information
- Location: Sinshih, Tainan; Taiwan
- Coordinates: 23°06′26″N 120°18′07″E
- Operated by: Taiwan Railway Corporation
- Line: Western Trunk line (282)
- Distance: 337.1 km from Keelung

Construction
- Structure type: Surface

Other information
- Station code: 282
- Classification: 簡易站 (Taiwan Railways Administration level)

History
- Opened: 14 July 2010
Location

Nanke (Chinese: 南科車站; pinyin: Nánke Chēzhàn) is a railway station of the Taiwan Railway West Coast line located in Sinshih District, Tainan City, Taiwan.

== Around the station ==
- National Nanke International Experimental High School
- Museum of Archaeology, Tainan Branch of National Museum of Prehistory
- Southern Taiwan Science Park
- World Vegetable Center

== See also ==
- List of railway stations in Taiwan

Preceding station	Taiwan Railway	Following station
Shanhua towards Keelung	Western Trunk line	Xinshi towards Pingtung
