= Jacana Ecological Education Park =

Park in Guantian, Tainan, Taiwan

- 水雉生態教育園區
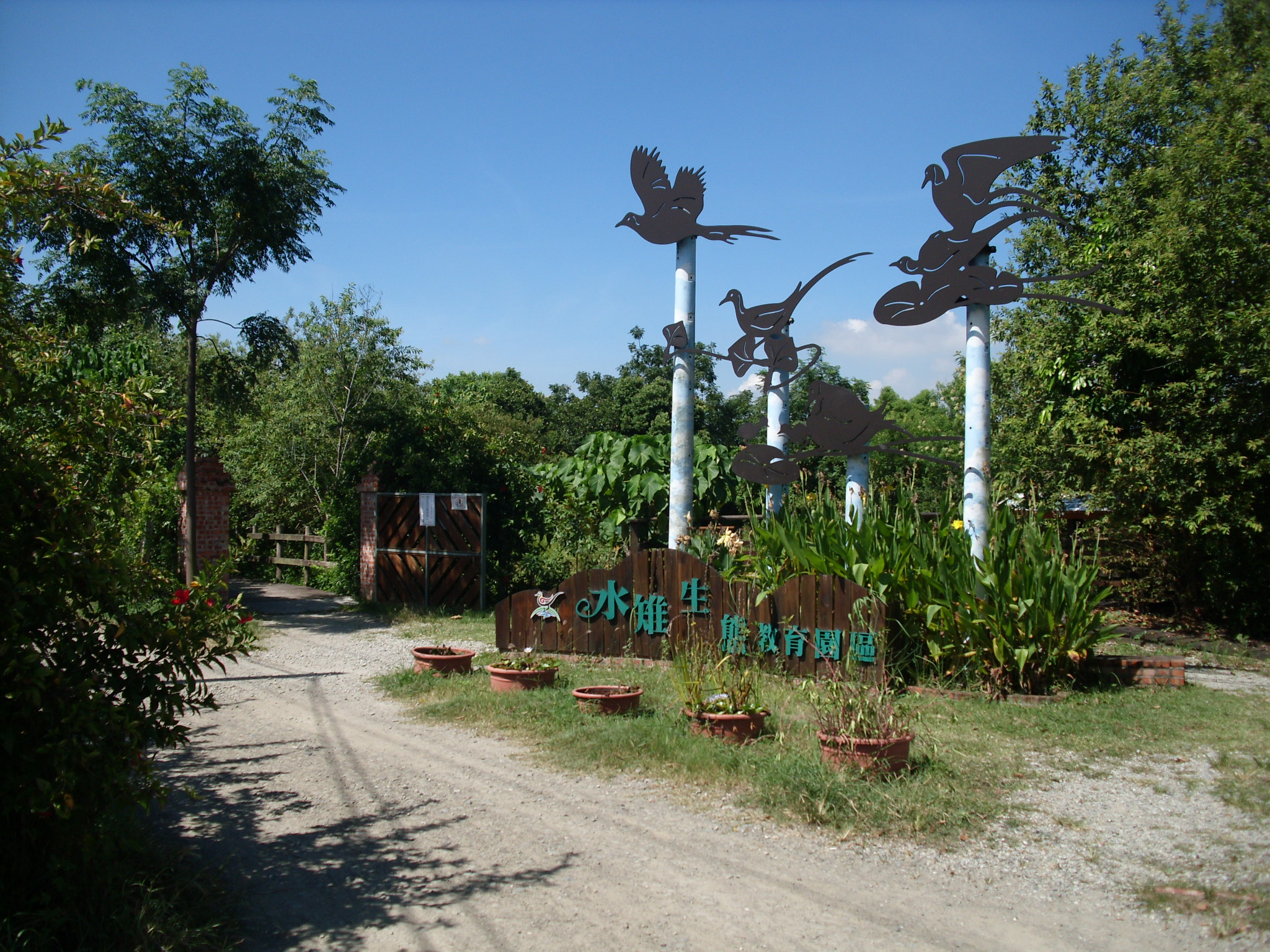
- Interactive map of Jacana Ecological Education Park
- Type: birdwatching park
- Location: Guantian, Tainan, Taiwan
- Coordinates: 23°11′04.2″N 120°18′47.2″E
- Website: Official website (in Chinese)

The Jacana Ecological Education Park (traditional Chinese: 水雉生態教育園區; simplified Chinese: 水雉生态教育园区; pinyin: Shuǐzhì Shēngtài Jiàoyù Yuánqū) is a birdwatching park in Guantian District, Tainan, Taiwan, featuring pheasant-tailed jacanas.

== History ==
The area where the park lies used to be an uncultivated land and two shipping containers. The park was established by the collaboration between bird lovers of the area after 10 years of work.

== Transportation ==
The park is accessible within walking distance southwest of Longtian Station of Taiwan Railway.

== See also ==
- List of tourist attractions in Taiwan
