= Museum of Archaeology, Tainan Branch of National Museum of Prehistory =

Museum in Xinshi, Tainan, Taiwan

- 國立臺灣史前文化博物館南科考古館
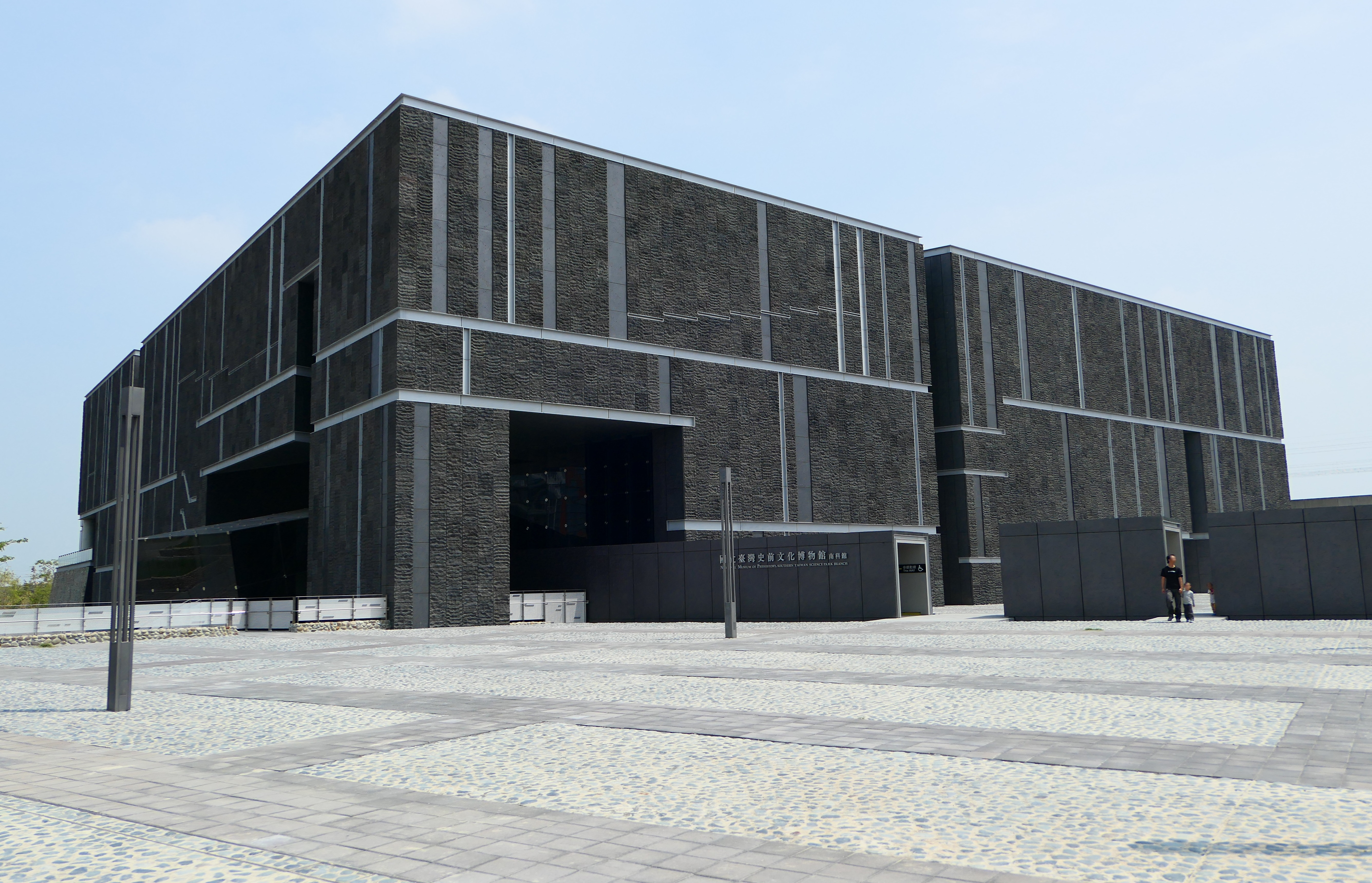
- Established: 26 December 2018; 7 years ago
- Location: Sinshih, Tainan, Taiwan
- Coordinates: 23°06′03.5″N 120°17′01.5″E
- Type: history museum
- Architect: Kris Yao
- Owner: National Museum of Prehistory
- Public transit access: Nanke Station
- Website: Official website

The Museum of Archaeology (traditional Chinese: 國立臺灣史前文化博物館南科館; simplified Chinese: 国立台湾史前文化博物馆南科馆; pinyin: Guólì Táiwān Shǐqiáng Wénhuà Bówùguǎn Nán Kē Guǎn) is a history museum in Southern Taiwan Science Park, Sinshih District, Tainan, Taiwan. The museum is the branch of National Museum of Prehistory.

== History ==
The soft opening of the museum was done on 26 December 2018. The ceremony was attended by Vice Culture Minister Lee Lien-chuan and a group of Siraya people. It was constructed with a cost of NT$1.5 billion. The museum was officially opened on 19 October 2019.

== Architecture ==
The museum spans over an area of 24,000 m^{2}. It was designed by architect Kris Yao.

== Exhibitions ==
The museum displays artifacts of Taiwan's prehistory culture, as well as those found during the construction of Southern Taiwan Science Park.

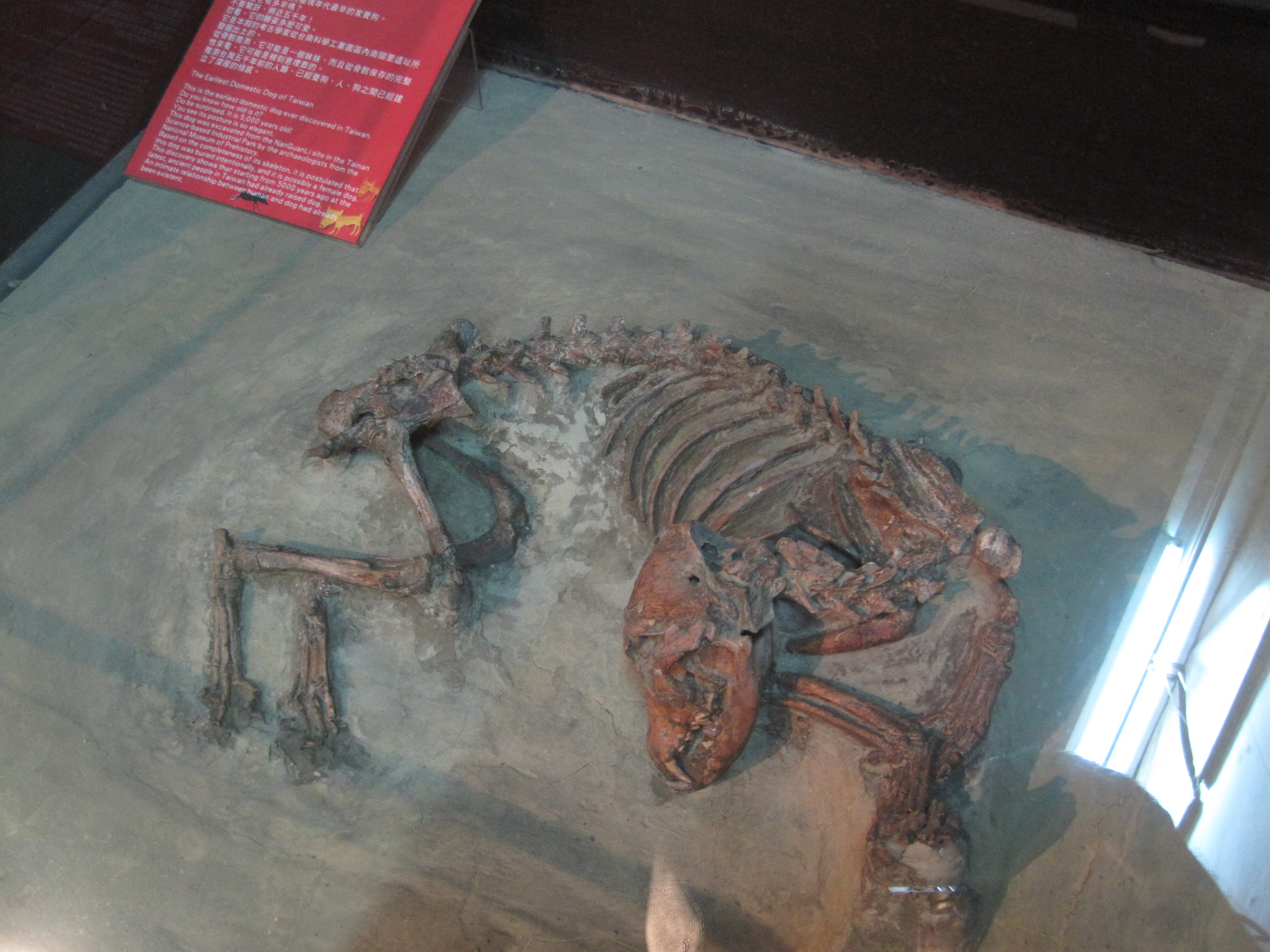
Dog remains from Nanguanli Site

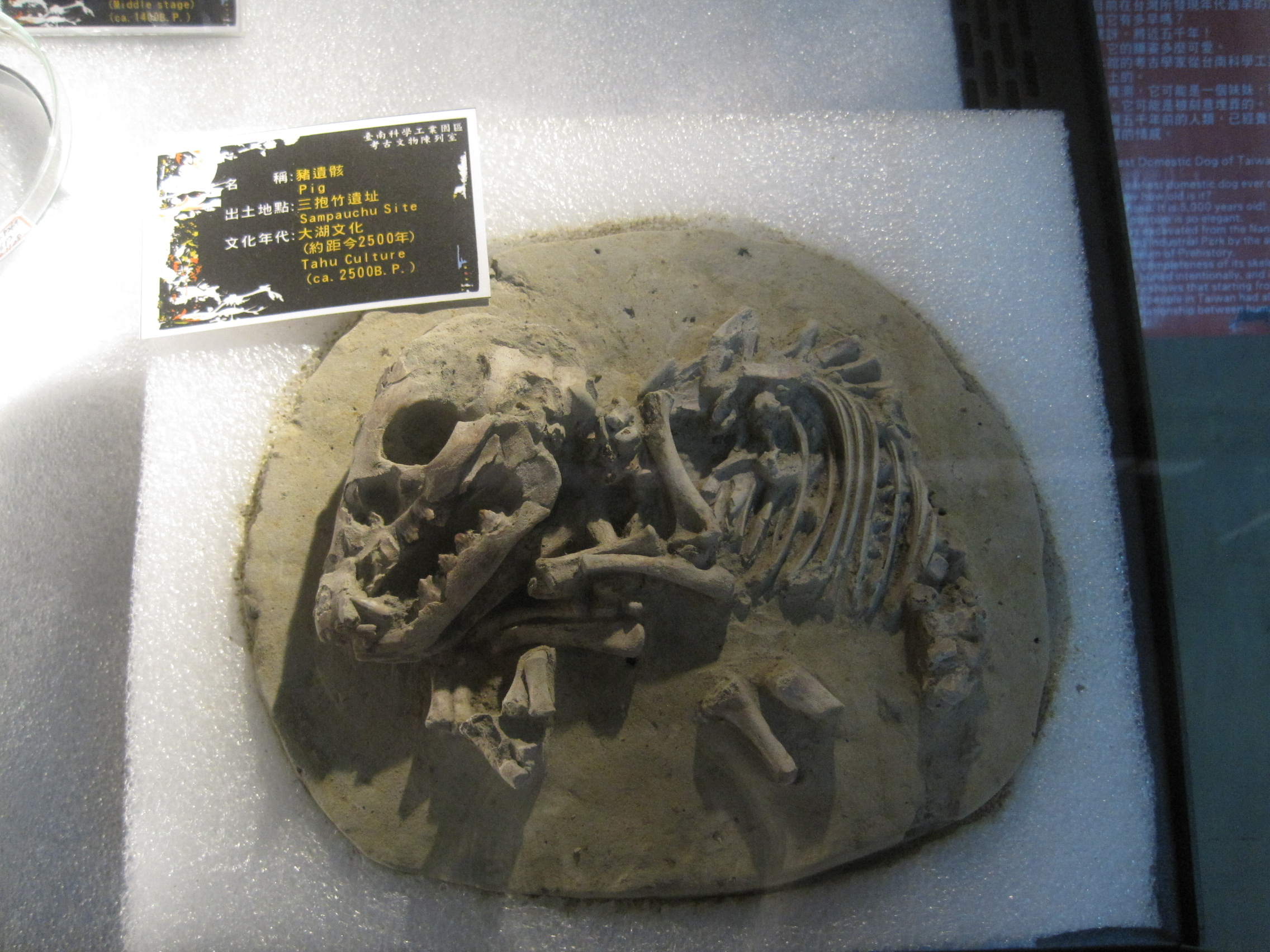
Pig remains from Sampauchu Site

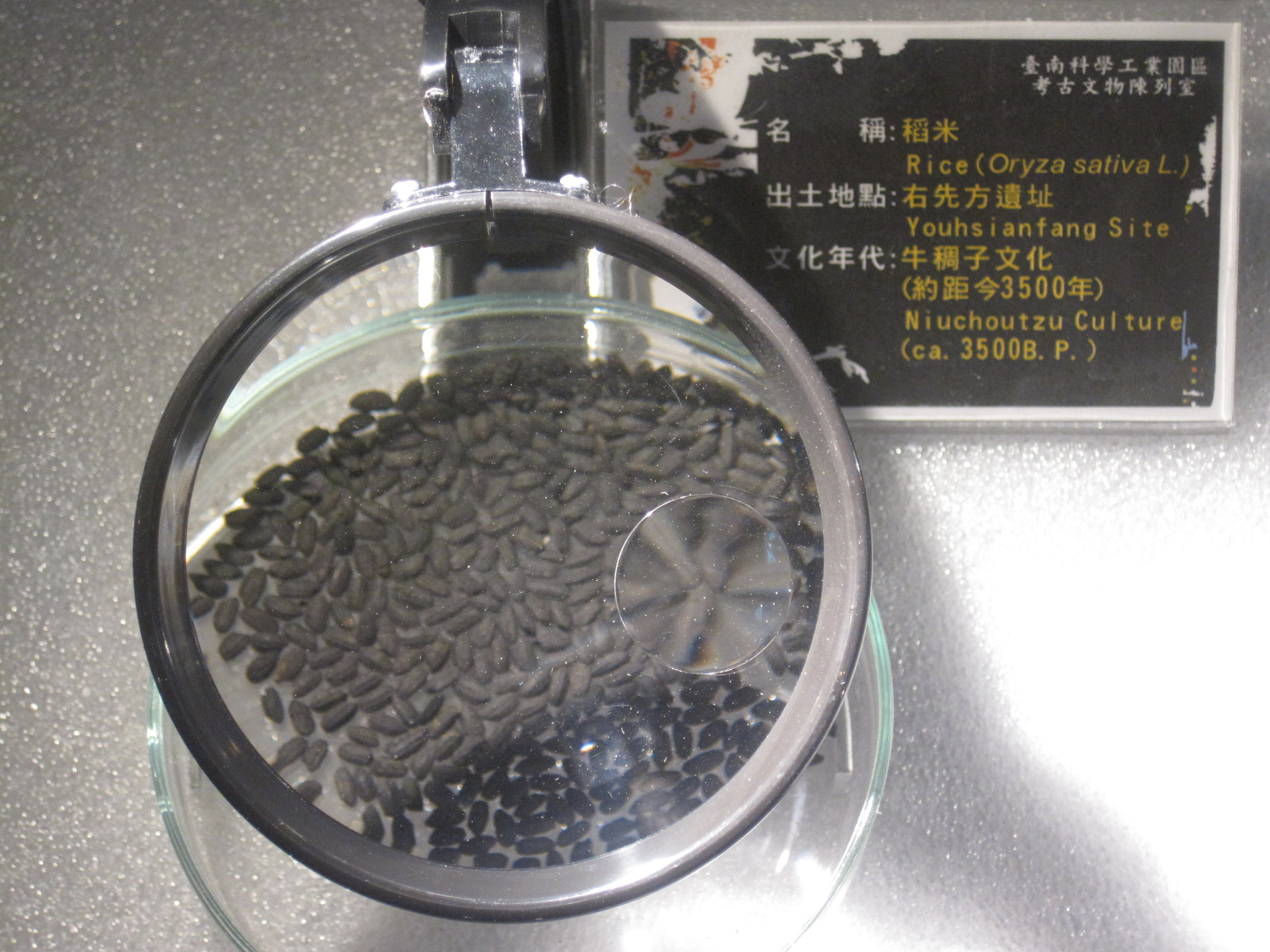
Rice seeds from Youhsianfang Site

== Transportation ==
The museum is accessible within walking distance west of Nanke Station of Taiwan Railway.

== See also ==
- List of museums in Taiwan
