= Sinshih District =

District in Tainan, Taiwan

Coordinates: 23°05′N 120°18′E

Sinshih 新市區 Xinshi; Hsin Shih
- District
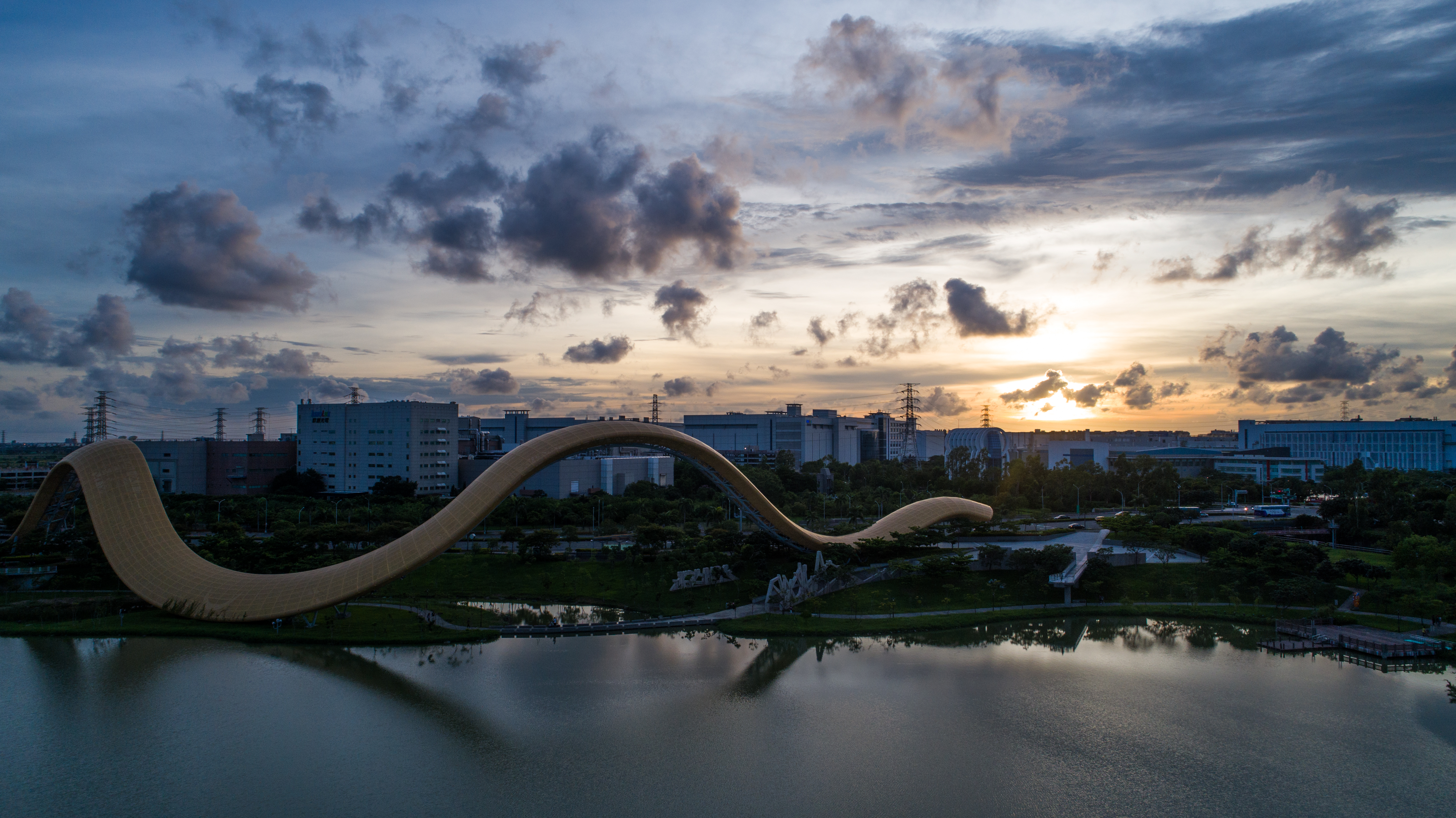
- View from Tainan Science Park in Sinshih District

- 臺南市新市區公所; Sinshih District Office, Tainan City

- Sinshih District in Tainan City
- Location: Tainan, Taiwan

Area
  - Total: 48 km^{2} (19 sq mi)

Population (May 2022)
  - Total: 37,435
  - Density: 780/km^{2} (2,000/sq mi)
- Website: www.sinshih.gov.tw (in Chinese)

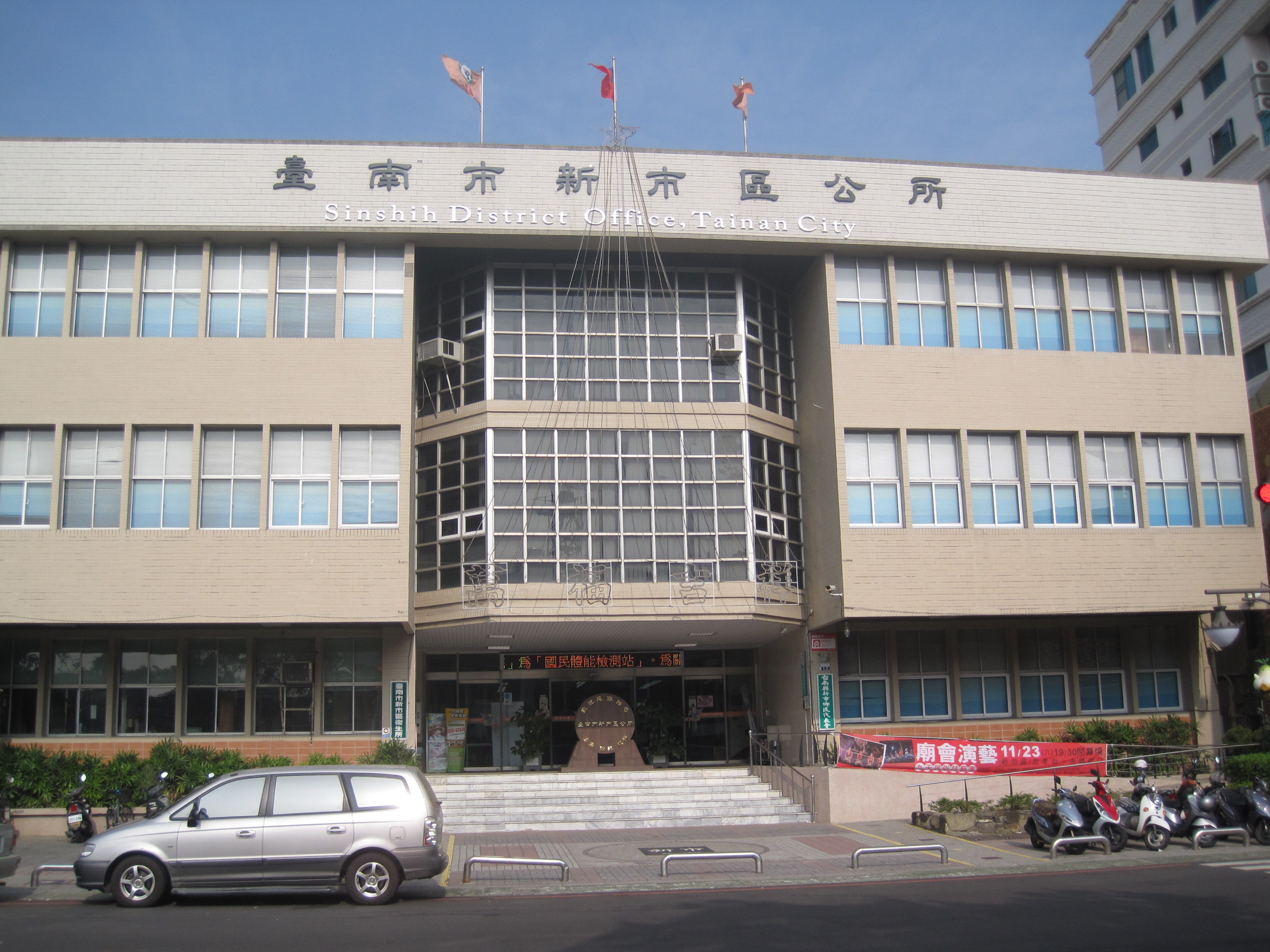
Sinshih District Office

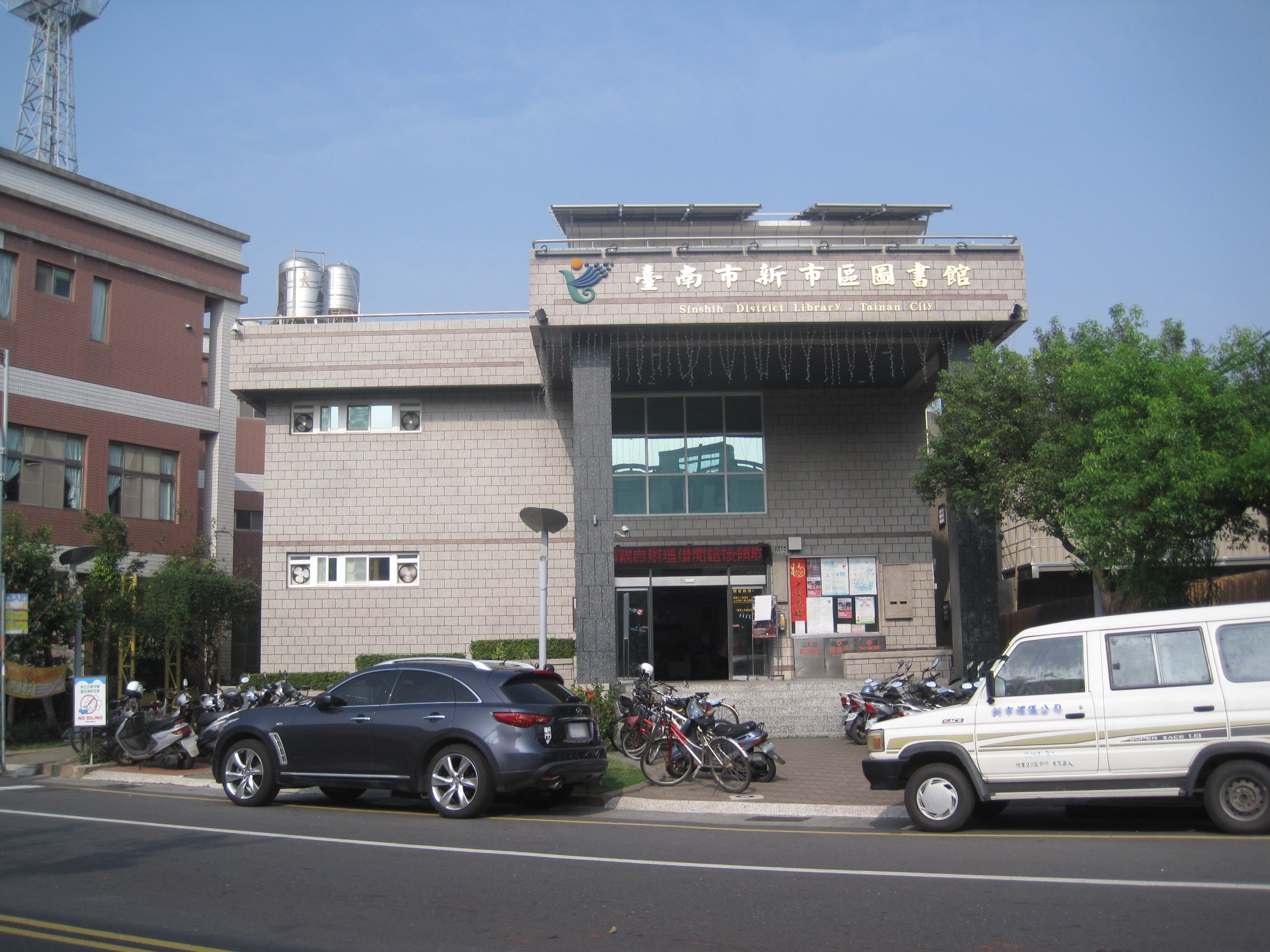
Sinshih District Library

Sinshih District (Chinese: 新市區; Hanyu Pinyin: Xīnshì Qū; Tongyong Pinyin: Sinshìh Cyu; Wade–Giles: Hsin^{1}-shih^{4} Ch'ü^{1}; Pe̍h-ōe-jī: Sin-chhī-khu; lit. 'new market'), alternatively spelled Xinshi, is a rural district in central Tainan, Taiwan, about 11 km north of Fort Provintia. As Sincan, it was one of the most important stations of the Dutch East India Company (VOC) in the 17th century. Missionary work formally began and the largest amount of inland trade occurred at Sinkan.

== Name ==
The village name of Sincan has also been recorded as Sinckan, Cinckan, Xincan, and Zinckan. The place shares the same namesake as the Sinckan language and Sinckan Manuscripts. After the Kingdom of Tungning, the name was Sinicized into Sin-kang (Chinese: 新港; pinyin: Xingang; Pe̍h-ōe-jī: Sin-káng; lit. 'new harbor/new inlet').

== History ==
Located about 7 miles (11 km) north of Sakam (see Fort Provintia), Sinkan was one of the most important stations of the Dutch during the 17th century. Sinkan was the smallest of four main aboriginal villages near the Dutch base at Tayouan, with around 1,000 inhabitants. This fact led them to seek friendship and protection from the Dutch; Sinkan was the VOC's closest ally. During the governorship of Pieter Nuyts, Sinkan unsuccessfully pursued protection from Tokugawa Iemitsu.

In 1861 Consul Robert Swinhoe arrived at Taiwan-fu (modern-day Tainan) and became the first European writer to come into contact with the Taiwanese aborigines after Maurice Benyovszky in 1771. Swinhoe wrote that he was informed by a "thoroughly Chinese-looking" military officer that his ancestor was one of 3,000 Dutch soldiers remaining in the island during the reign of Koxinga (and after Dutch rule), and that his village of Sinkang was chiefly composed of the soldiers' descendants.

Sinshih Township was created in 1945 as part of Sinhua District, Tainan County. In 1946, Sinshih Township was transferred to direct administration by Tainan County and in July, the villages of Dashe and Tanding, originally part of Shanshang, were transferred to the administration of Sinshih Township.

The former Sinshih District Office at No. 3, Jhongsing Street was demolished in 1983. The current Sinshih District Office at No. 12, Jhongsing Street was completed in March 1984.

On December 25, 2010, Tainan City and County were merged. At the same time, Sinshih Township was renamed as Sinshih District.

In May 2019, the Taiwan Power Company announced plans to build a large solar energy power facility in Tainan. At that time, the Tainan city government had recently finished a bidding process to determine contracts in several areas including Sinshih District for roof-top solar power generation.

== Geography ==
- Area: 49.51 km^{2}
- Population: 35,883 people (January 2016)

== Administrative divisions ==
The district consists of Xinshi, Xinhe, Shenei, Dazhou, Fenghua, Sanshe, Daying, Dashe, Tanding, Gangqi and Yongjiu Village.

== Economy ==
Part of Tainan Science Park, which was founded in 1996, lies within Sinshih.

== Education ==
- Far East University

== Tourist attractions ==
- Museum of Archaeology, Tainan Branch of National Museum of Prehistory
- Dashe Folk Culture Museum
- Daying Couple Tree
- Sincan Tribe Museum
- Zhang Family Mansion

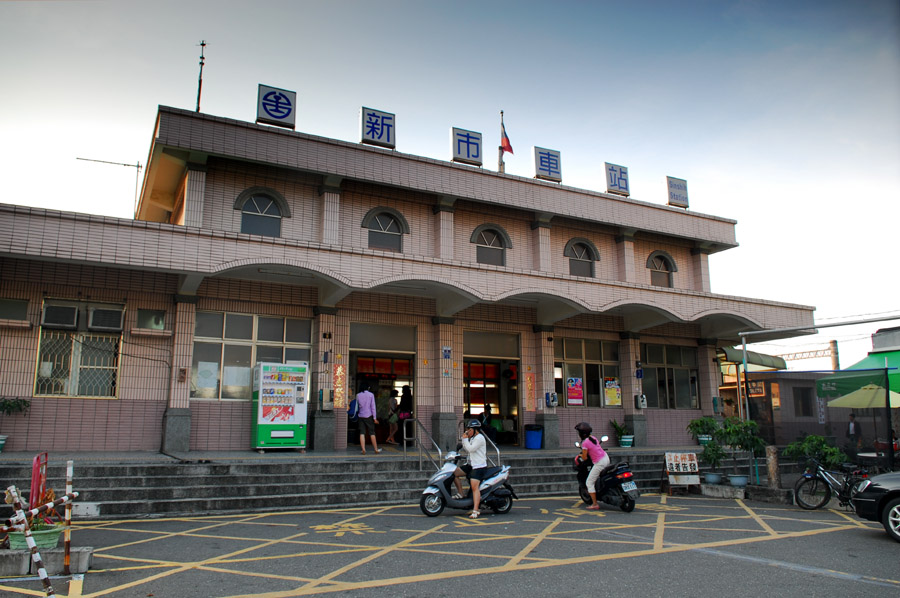
Xinshi Station

== Transportation ==
- TR Nanke Station
- TR Xinshi Station

== See also ==
- Tainan
