= Shen Guangwen =

- 沈光文
- Born: 1612; Zhejiang, Ming
- Died: 1688 (aged 75–76); Tainan, Fujian, Qing
- Occupations: Writer, educator
- Known for: the founder of Taiwanese Chinese literature
- Predecessor: Zhang Yan-bin

Shen Guangwen
- Chinese: 沈光文
Transcriptions
Standard Mandarin
- Hanyu Pinyin: Shěn Guāngwén
- Wade–Giles: Shen Kuang-wên

Other names

Wenkai
- Traditional Chinese: 文開
- Simplified Chinese: 文开
- Literal meaning: Opener of Civilization or Literature
Transcriptions
Standard Mandarin
- Hanyu Pinyin: Wénkāi
- Wade–Giles: Wên-k‘ai

Si'an
- Chinese: 斯庵
Transcriptions
Standard Mandarin
- Hanyu Pinyin: Sī'ān
- Wade–Giles: Ssu-an

Shen Guangwen (1612–1688), also known as Wenkai and Si'an, was a scholar, poet, educator, and the founder of Taiwanese Chinese literature. He is considered as such, despite having been born in Zhejiang in China, the Qing conquest of Ming forced him to move to Formosa, modern-day Taiwan in 1652. After that, he devoted the rest of his life mainly to enlightening inhabitants in modern-day Tainan until he died in 1688. Significantly, this was the very first opportunity for Taiwanese indigenous peoples to learn Han Chinese culture. As such, the achievement of Shen Guangwen was a crucial foundation in the development of education and culture in Taiwanese history. As a result, people show their respect for him by giving him another name "Taiwanese Confucius".

== Personal history ==
Before Shen Guangwen moved to Taiwan, he was a scholar of the Confucian tradition. More specifically, he was a student of Zhang Yanbin (張延賓). On that fact, he studied a number of ancient Chinese texts, such as Shijing and Shujing and others. This seemed to be his vital background to contribute in education and culture in Taiwan. In 1652, he unintentionally arrived in Taiwan when the southern region of Taiwan was ruled by Dutch. Importantly, this was a full decade before Koxinga arrived in Taiwan. Shen Guangwen was one of the Chinese scholars who escaped to Taiwan, as the Manchus took the imperial capital to rule Southward in China proper. In fact, Shen Guangwen traveled in the Southeastern area of China between 1645 and 1651. Eventually he moved to Tainan after staying approximately for one year in Yilan, Taiwan.

== Achievements ==
=== As the founder of Taiwanese Chinese literature ===
Since Shen Guangwen settled down in Taiwan, he started to play an important role as an educator. He, for instance, taught Han Chinese culture to native people in terms of writing and reading. Indeed, he had a very strong support from Koxinga at that time from 1665 to 1674, as Koxinga treated him as a very important person for his political purpose by providing a land and a house. Subsequently, Shen Guangwen was one of the people who were devoted to establishing the Kingdom of Tungning as an educator in Taiwanese history. However, the situation had changed after Zheng Jing, who was the son of Koxinga, started to rule Taiwan. As Shen Gunag-wen disapproved of Zheng Jing’s policies, he needed to flee to Shanhua. Even though he did not have some support as he had like in the past, he continued to teach Chinese literature and medicine in Shanhua.

=== As a poet ===
Shen Guangwen himself was not only an educator and scholar, but was also a poet. He belonged to the first generation of poets in Taiwanese traditional literature history. This period has important meaning in Taiwanese literary history, as it was the very first time the Classical Chinese literature was introduced to Taiwan, after Koxinga defeated Dutch Formosa. He completed a considerable number of works, such as Wenkai Wenji (文開文集), Liuwukao (流寓考), Caoshuza Ji (草木雜紀), Taiwan Fu (臺灣賦), Taiwanyu Tukao (臺灣與圖考) and others. Additionally, he also established a poetry party called Dongning Shishe (東呤詩社), when the Qing dynasty defeated the Kingdom of Tungning and started to rule Taiwan in 1683.

== Influence and legacy ==
According to the Taiwanese history, the reputation of Shen Guangwen was distinctively underscored by regarding him as the founder of Taiwanese literature in Classical Chinese. As a result, the noticeable influence can be distinguished in many remains so far. Wenkai (文开) academy, for instance, was named Shen Gunag-wen’s other name in order to honor his contribution during the 17th Century. This academy not only collected books and provided a place where candidates could study for the local civil service examination but also employed contemporary scholars to encourage their studies. Subsequently, Wenkai academy symbolises the huge contribution of Shen Guangwen in terms of proliferation of literacy in Taiwanese history.

== Memorial places ==
In addition, there are a few more places where Shen Guangwen’s achievements can be remembered at present. Most significant of all, Qingan (庆安) temple in Shanhua is one of the memorial places of Shen Guangwen. In fact, this Qingan temple is a third-grade national relic which has about 300 years of history in Taiwan, but unfortunately the original structure of Qingan temple can not be seen nowadays. Initially, Qingan temple was a language school which was built by the Dutch East India Company. However, this school was converted into a shrine for Wenchang Dijun (文昌帝君) who is the god of education, and after that Qingan temple was built on this shrine. In particular, on the second floor, there is an icon of Shen Guangwen as the sixth facet of Wenchang Dijun owing to his educational contribution in the exhibition room. Moreover, there is some background information displayed in relation to him.

As other memorial places of Shen Guangwen in Shanhua, there are Shen Guangwen memorials at Zhongshan Road, Guangwen Road, and the Guangwen Building at Shanhua Junior High School.

== Reputation ==
The noticeable contribution of Shen Guangwen should be emphasised as an educational and cultural aspect to local people, as this significantly influenced to the development of civilisation in Taiwanese history. Furthermore, his achievements in the literary arena should be recognised, as he was the first generation of traditional literature in Taiwanese history.
