= Zhengbin Fishing Port =

Fishing port in Zhongzheng District, Keelung, Taiwan

Zhengbin Fishing Port 正濱漁港
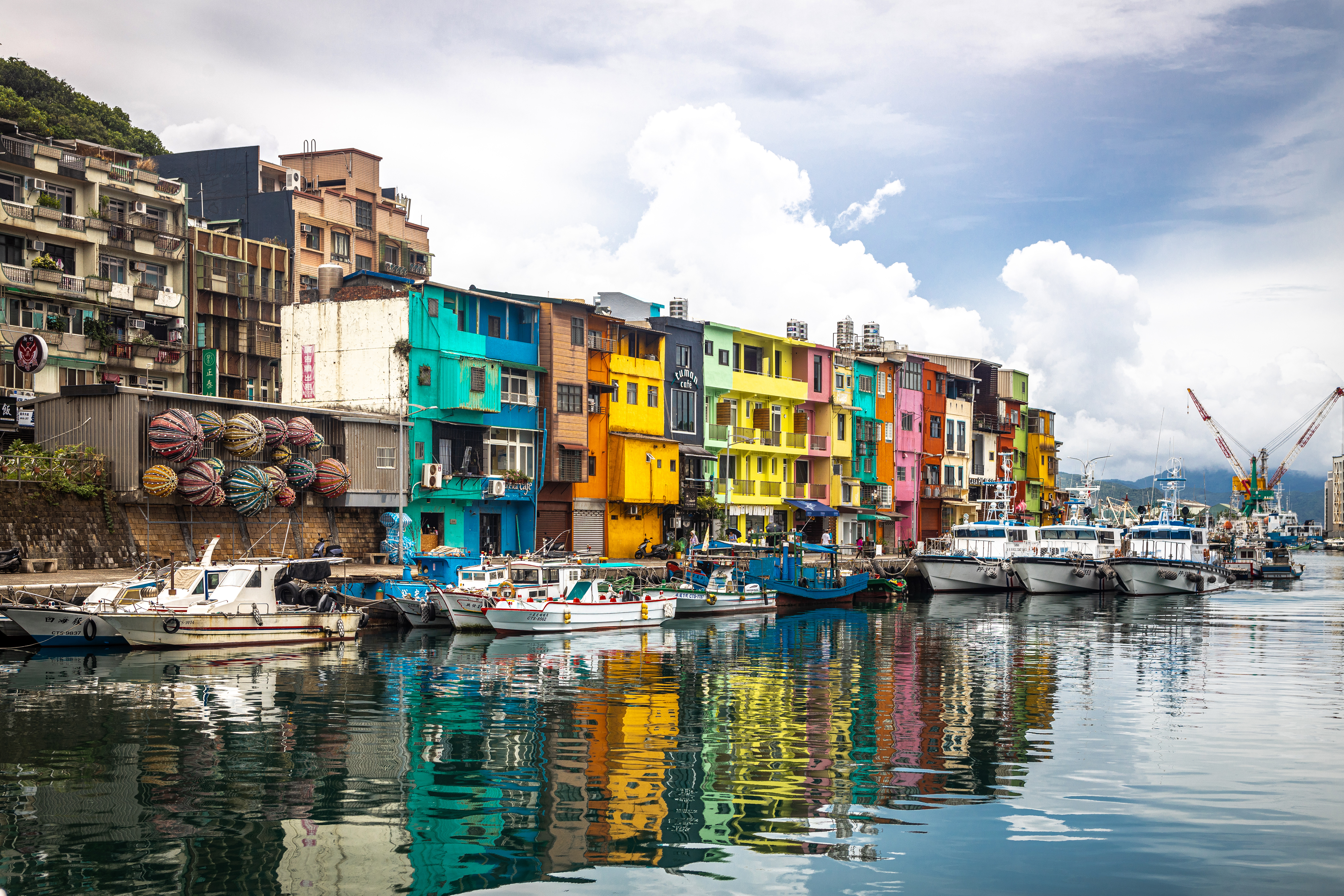
- Colorful houses at Zhengbin Fishing Port in 2023
- Interactive map of Zhengbin Fishing Port 正濱漁港
- Location within Taiwan

Location
- Location: Zhongzheng District, Keelung, Taiwan
- Coordinates: 25°9′7″N 121°45′59″E

Details
- Owned by: Keelung City Government
- Type of Harbor: fishing port

The Zhengbin Fishing Port (traditional Chinese: 正濱漁港; simplified Chinese: 正滨渔港; pinyin: Zhèngbīn Yúgǎng) is a fishing port located in Zhongzheng District, Keelung, Taiwan.

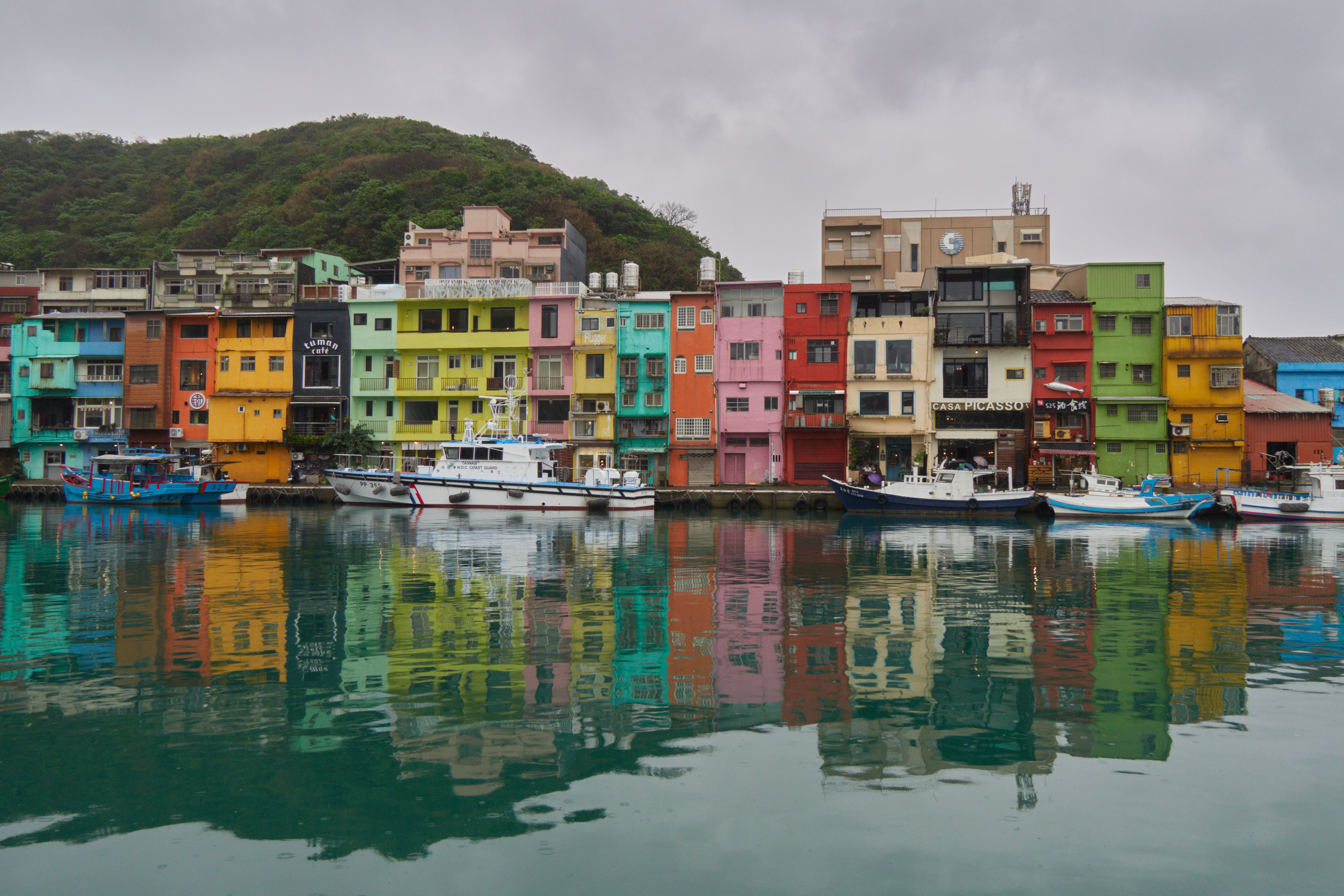
Zhengbin Fishing Port, on a cloudy day, with natural colour saturation levels

== History ==
Built by the Japanese in 1934, the port used to be the largest fishing port in Taiwan and the main export port of Jinguashi copper mine during the Japanese colonial period. No longer the bustling center of its past, nowadays the pace of life is much slower in this corner of the city. However, Zhengbin Fishing Port is now popular amongst both locals and tourists for its row of 16 multi-colored houses situated on the bank. The port is located a five-minute walking distance away from the Keelung City Indigenous Cultural Hall.

== Transportation ==
The port is accessible via multiple bus routes, e.g. Keelung bus 101 to Zhengbin Rd. bus stop as well as buses 103 and 104 to Zhongzheng District Health Center bus stop.

== See also ==
- Fisheries Agency
- Badouzi Fishing Port
- Bisha Fishing Port
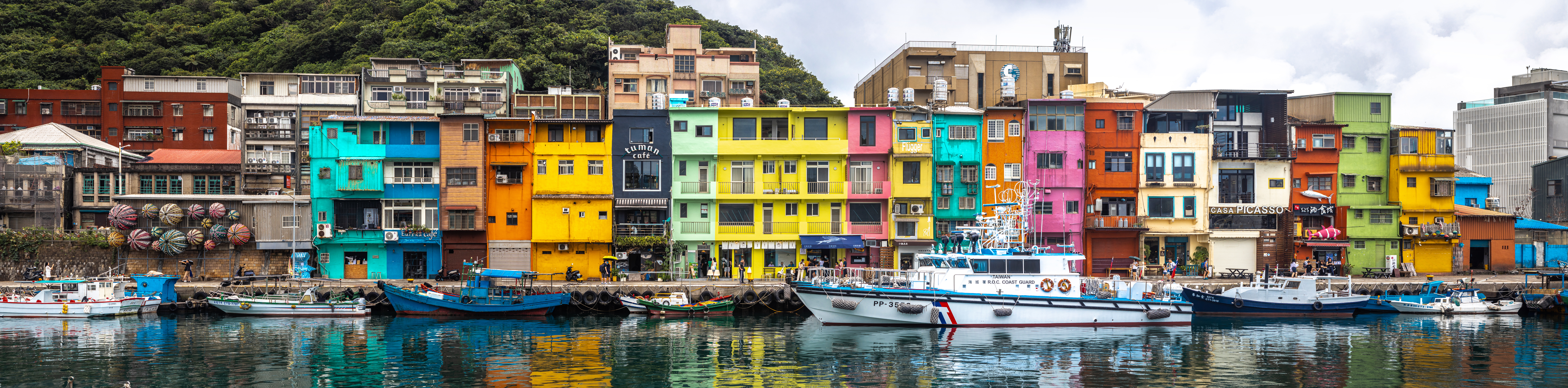
A panoramic view of Zhengbin Fishing Port in July 2023
