= Badouzi Fishing Port =

Port in Zhongzheng, Keelung, Taiwan

Badouzi Fishing Port 八斗子漁港
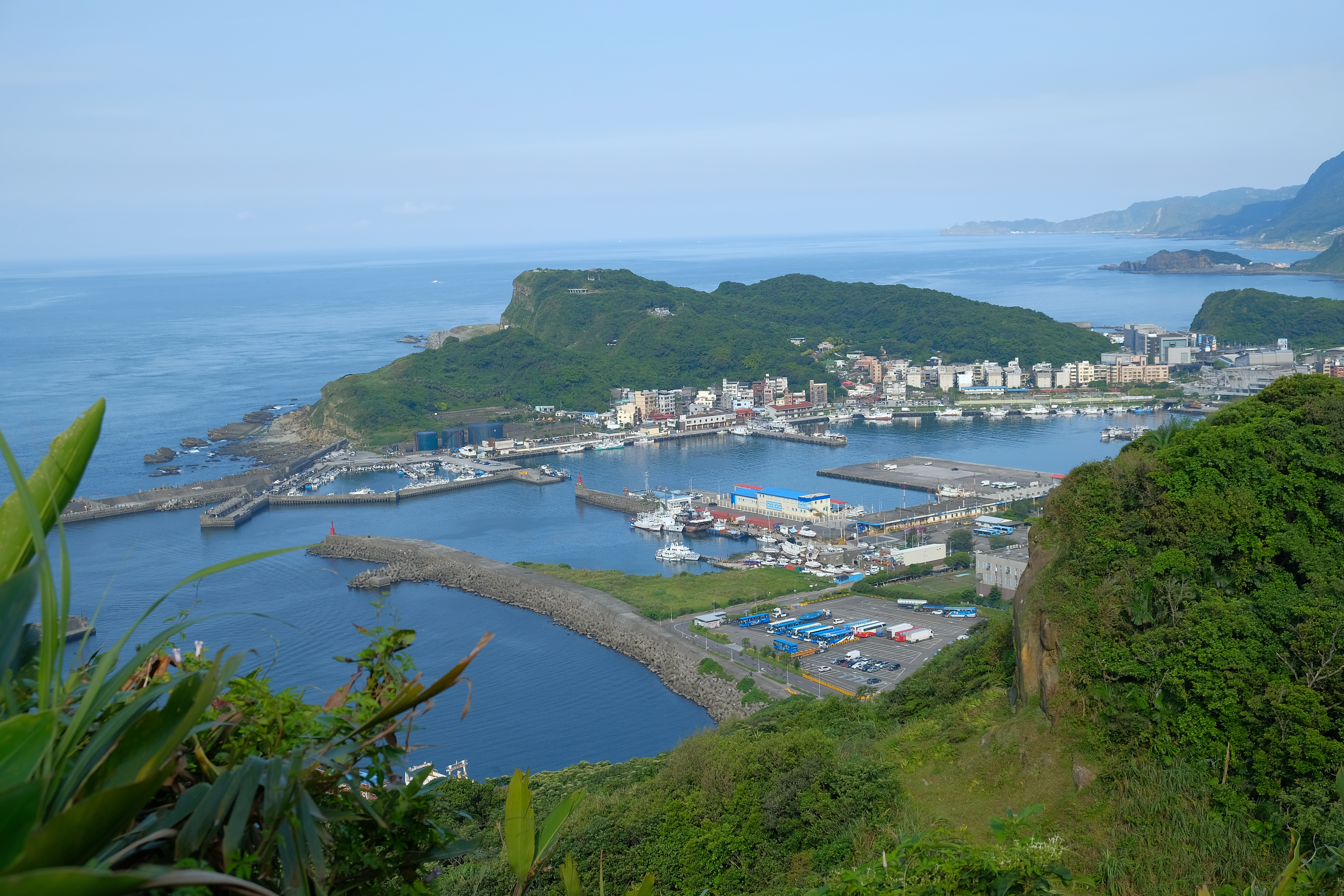
- Interactive map of Badouzi Fishing Port 八斗子漁港
- Location within Taiwan

Location
- Location: Zhongzheng, Keelung, Taiwan
- Coordinates: 25°08′40.2″N 121°47′28.9″E

Details
- Opened: 1975
- Type of Harbor: fishing port

The Badouzi Fishing Port (traditional Chinese: 八斗子漁港; simplified Chinese: 八斗子渔港; pinyin: Bādǒuzi Yúgǎng) is a fish harbor in Zhongzheng District, Keelung, Taiwan.

== History ==
The fish harbor was established in 1975. Recently, the harbor has been developed into a modern recreational fish harbor.

== Destinations ==
The harbor serves as the departure point for Keelung Islet.

== Transportation ==
The fish harbor is accessible within walking distance north west of Haikeguan Station of Taiwan Railway.

== See also ==
- Fisheries Agency
- Zhengbin Fishing Port
- Bisha Fishing Port
