= Bisha Fishing Port =

Port in Zhongzheng, Keelung, Taiwan

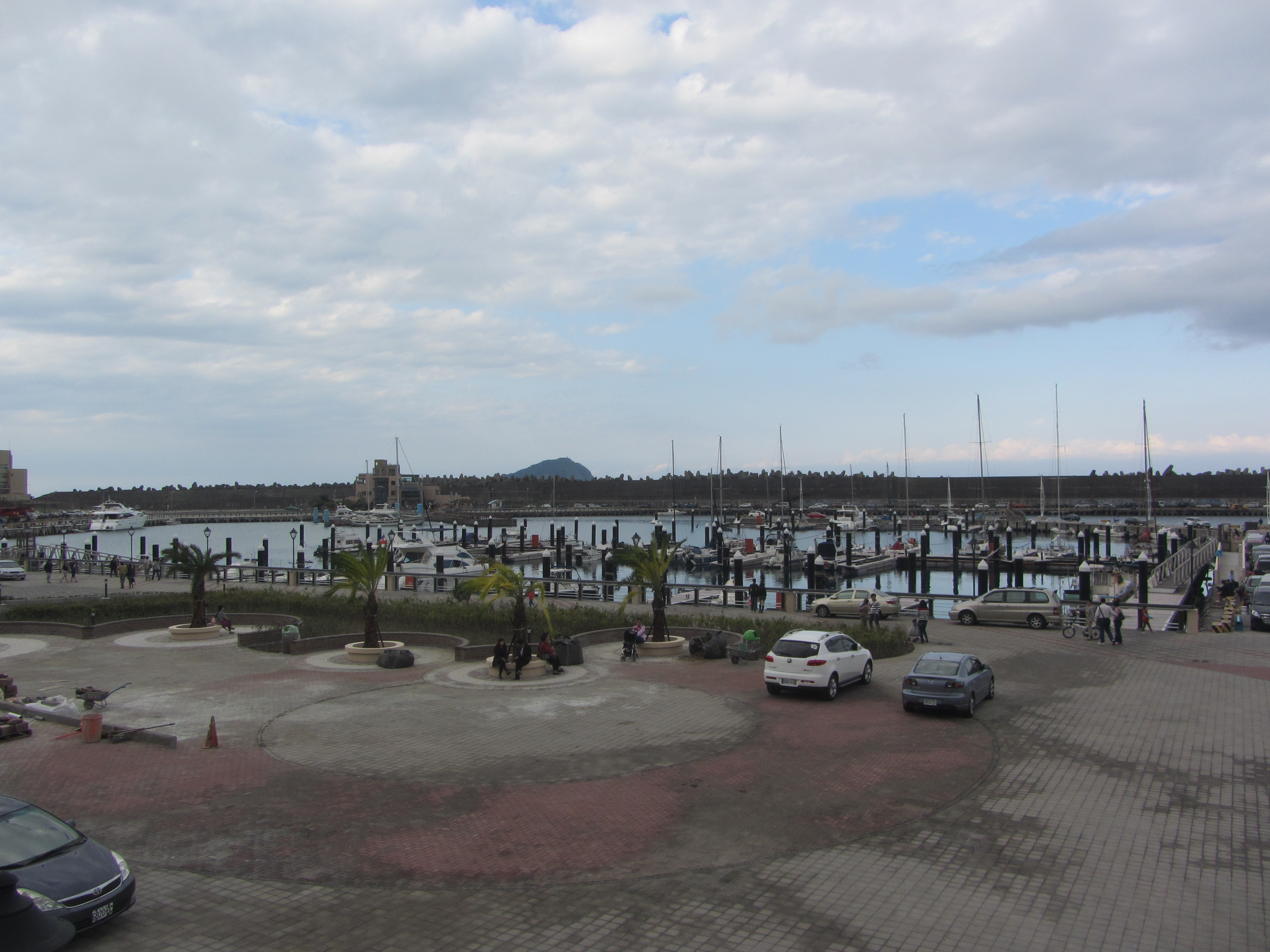
- Interactive map of Bisha Fishing Port
- Location within Taiwan
- Native name: 碧砂漁港

Location
- Location: Zhongzheng, Keelung, Taiwan
- Coordinates: 25°08′44.4″N 121°47′09.6″E

Details
- Type of Harbor: fishing port

The Bisha Fishing Port (traditional Chinese: 碧砂漁港; simplified Chinese: 碧砂渔港; pinyin: Bìshā Yúgǎng) is a harbor and fish market in Zhongzheng District, Keelung, Taiwan.

== Architecture ==
The port consists of two rectangular buildings, which are the fish market and food court. It also features the retired Haikung Boat which used to be used for sea research activities.

== Destinations ==
The harbor serves as the departure point for Keelung Islet.

== Transportation ==
The port is accessible by Keelung City Bus from Keelung Station of Taiwan Railway.

== See also ==
- Fisheries Agency
- Badouzi Fishing Port
- Zhengbin Fishing Port
