= Keelung Islet =

Islands in Taiwan

Native name: 基隆嶼, 基隆島
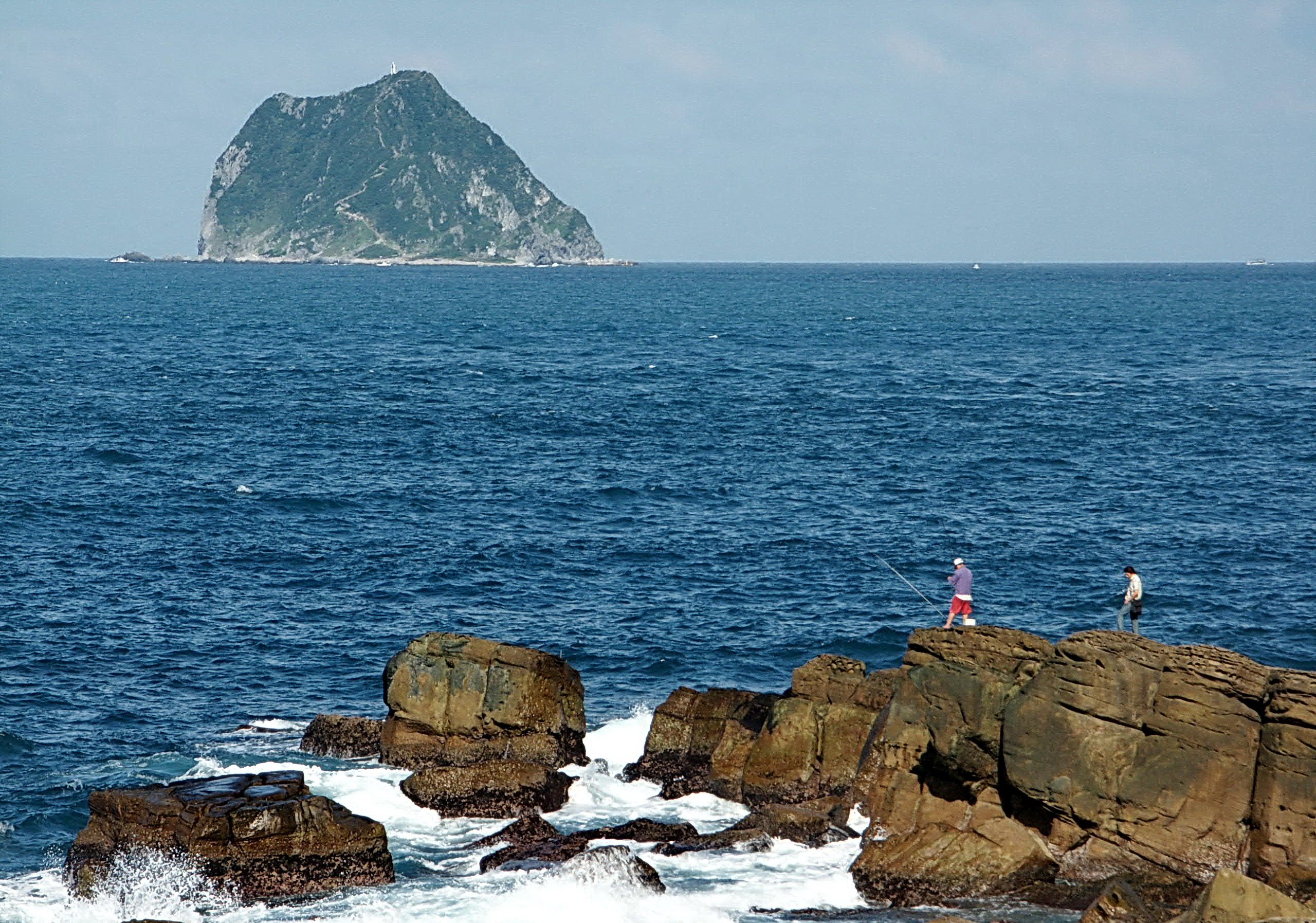

- Taiwan

Geography
- Location: Zhongzheng, Keelung, Taiwan
- Coordinates: 25°11′32″N 121°47′08″E
- Area: 23.91 ha (59.1 acres)
- Length: 910 m (2990 ft)
- Width: 410 m (1350 ft)
- Highest elevation: 182 m (597 ft)

Keelung Islet (Chinese: 基隆嶼; pinyin: Jīlóng Yǔ; Wade–Giles: Chi^{1}-lung^{2} Yü^{3}, also 基隆島, in Taiwanese Hokkien: 雞籠杙/Ke-lâng-khit) is a small island in Zhongzheng District, Keelung, Taiwan and 4.9 km (3.0 mi) away from the Port of Keelung. It has an area of 27,005.593 m^{2} (0.010426918 mi^{2}) or 23.91 ha (59.08 acres). It is 910 m (2,986 ft) in length, and 410 m (1,345 ft) in width including the artificial harbor, the highest point is 182 m (597 ft) above sea level.

== History ==
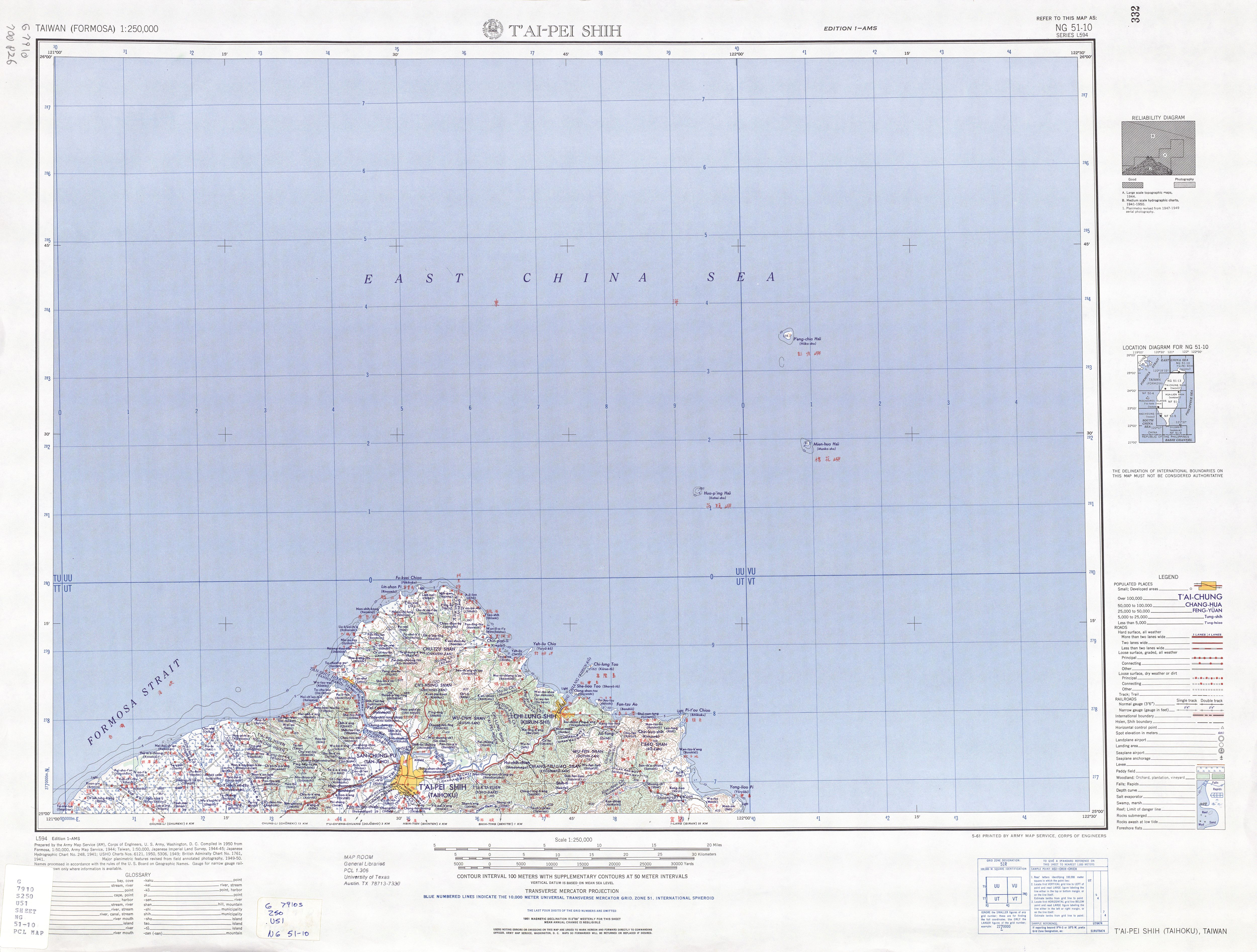
Keelung Islet (labeled as Chi-lung Tao (Kiirun-tō) 基隆島) (1950)

In ancient times, the island was seen as a sacred place by locals. It was rumoured that a female ghost named Shih-Yun lived there, to mourn over her husband who died in a shipwreck hundreds of years ago.

In the modern day, the islet is primarily used as a military training base. Since 2001, it has been opened for tourists. Ferry services to the island operate daily from the port of Keelung. There is a small port and a walkway on the island. The island is also popular with the local fishing industry, because of the quantity of fish it attracts in its surrounding sea.

In 2013, the islet was closed to visitors following Typhoon Soulik. The islet remained closed to the public as damage from Typhoon Soudelor in 2015 was repaired. In July 2017, the city government allocated NT$82 million for the island's infrastructure reparation and renovation works. Plans to reopen for tourists in August 2018 were delayed until June 2019. The islet was finally reopened again on 25 June.

== Geography ==
The island is volcanic, part of the Chilung Volcano Group. It dates from the Pleistocene period. The eruption was explosive tholeiitic andesite and dacite. The main mineral is calcium rich plagioclase. The magma source is the western extremity of the Ryukyu Volcanic Arc formed when the subducting Philippine Sea Plate was compressed below the edge of the Eurasian Plate at about 20 to 30 km deep. The magma was contaminated with continental crust material. Geochemistry of the rock shows that iron, aluminium, titanium, potassium, rubidium and strontium are enriched, but sodium, magnesium and nickel are impoverished.

== Transportation ==
The island can be accessed from Keelung mainland at Badouzi, Bisha or Keelung Ports.

== See also ==
- List of islands of Taiwan
