= Keelung =

City in Taiwan

Keelung 基隆市 Jilong, Ke-lung, Chilung, Kiirun, San Salvador de Pacán
- City
- Keelung City
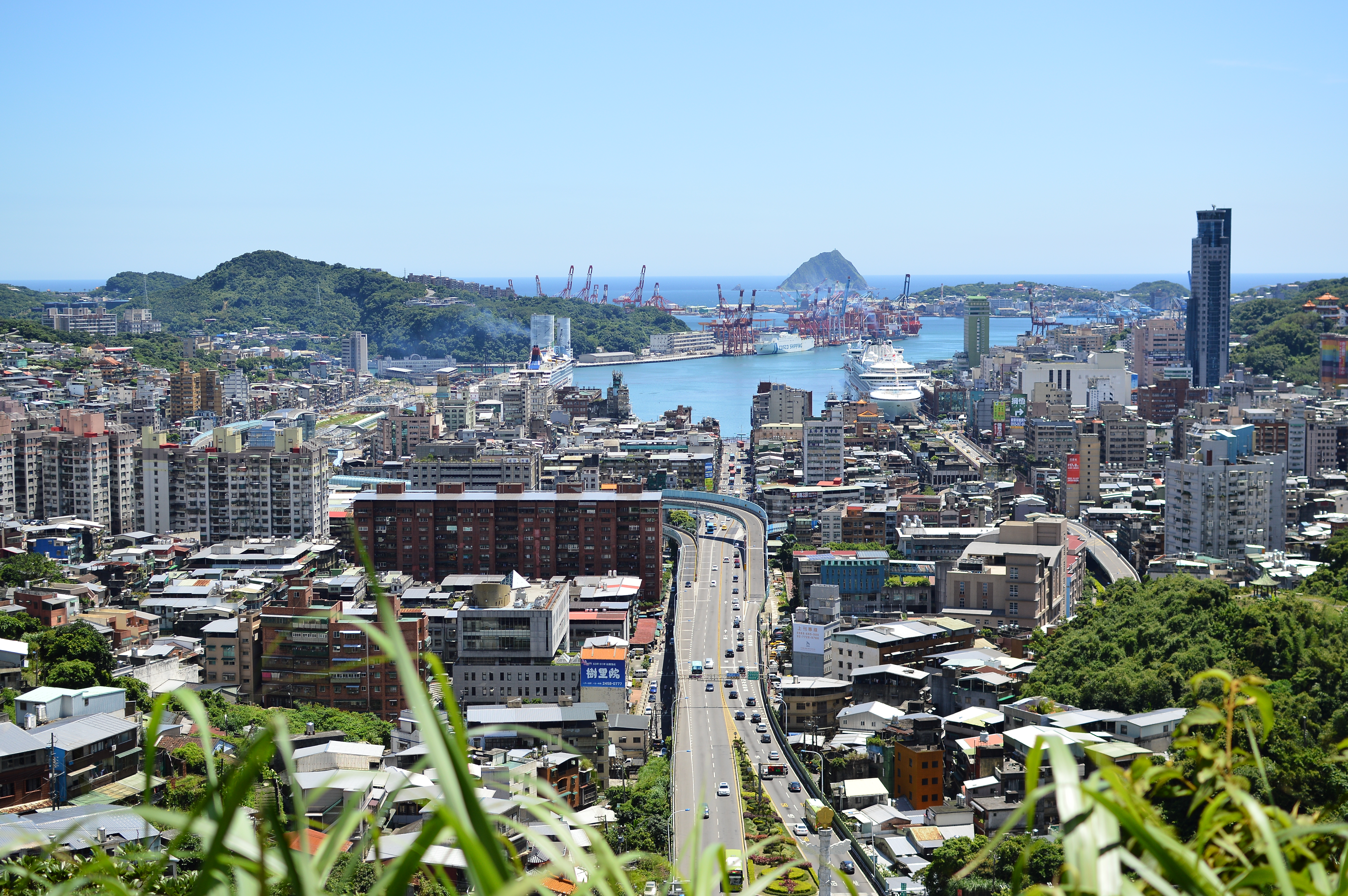
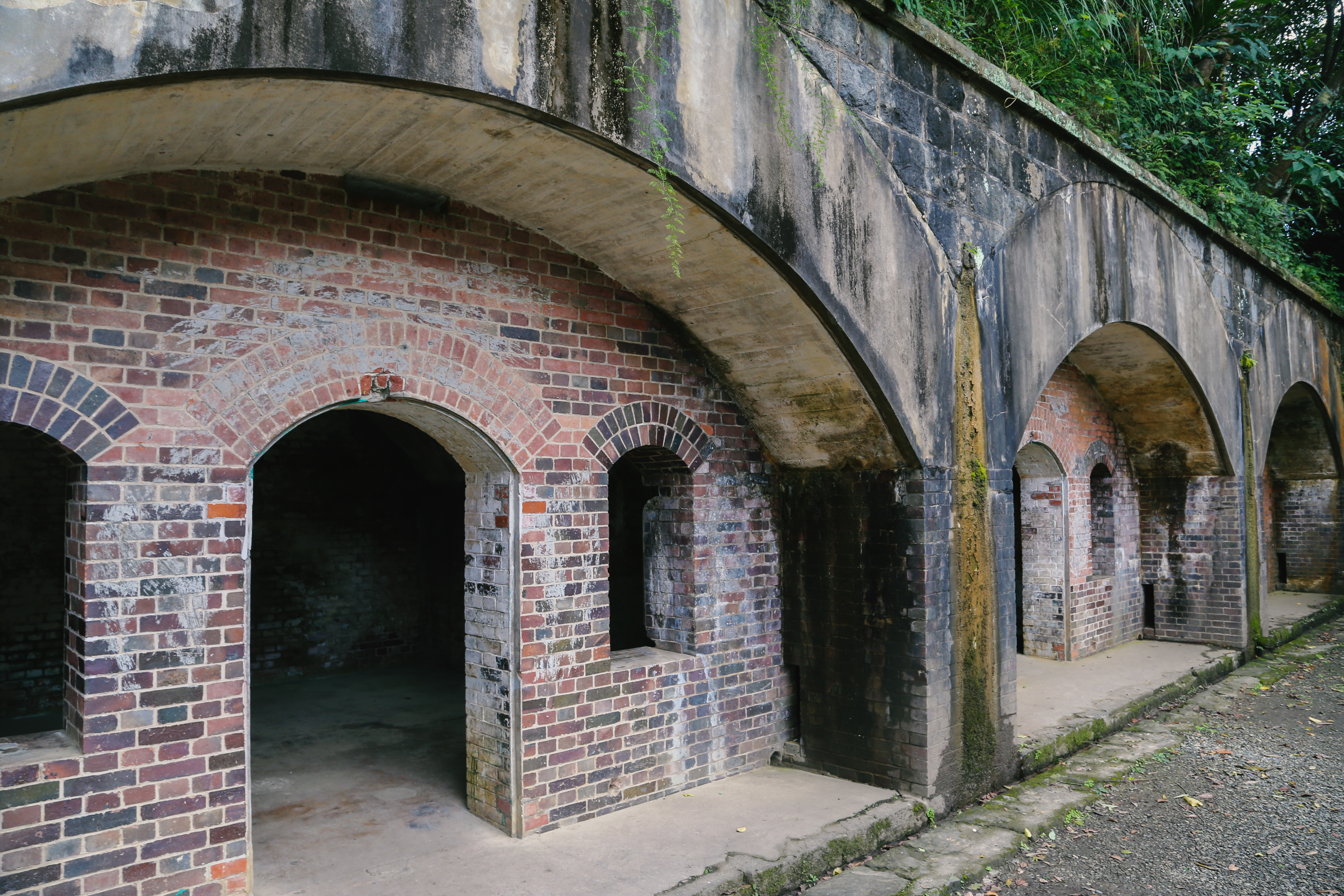
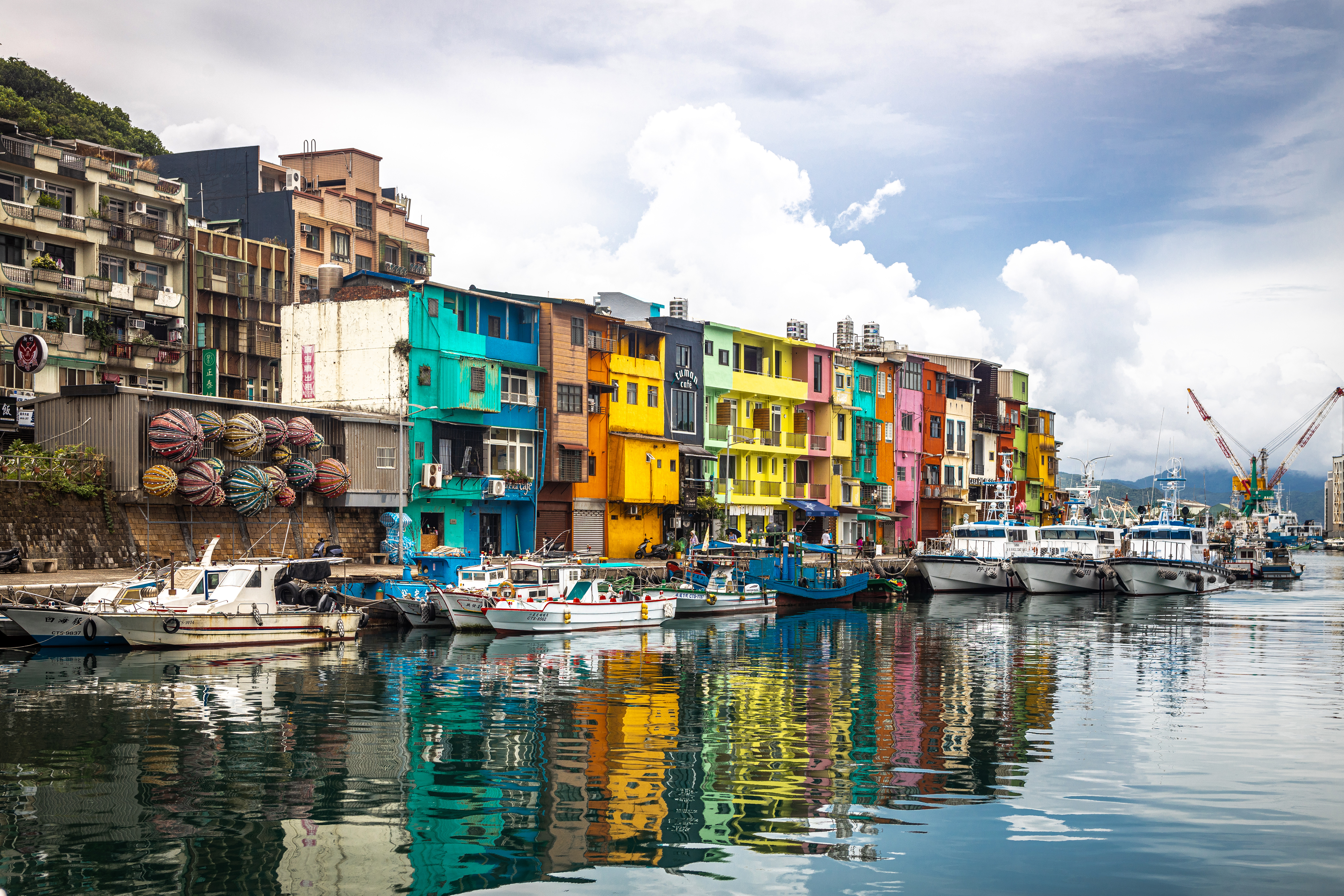
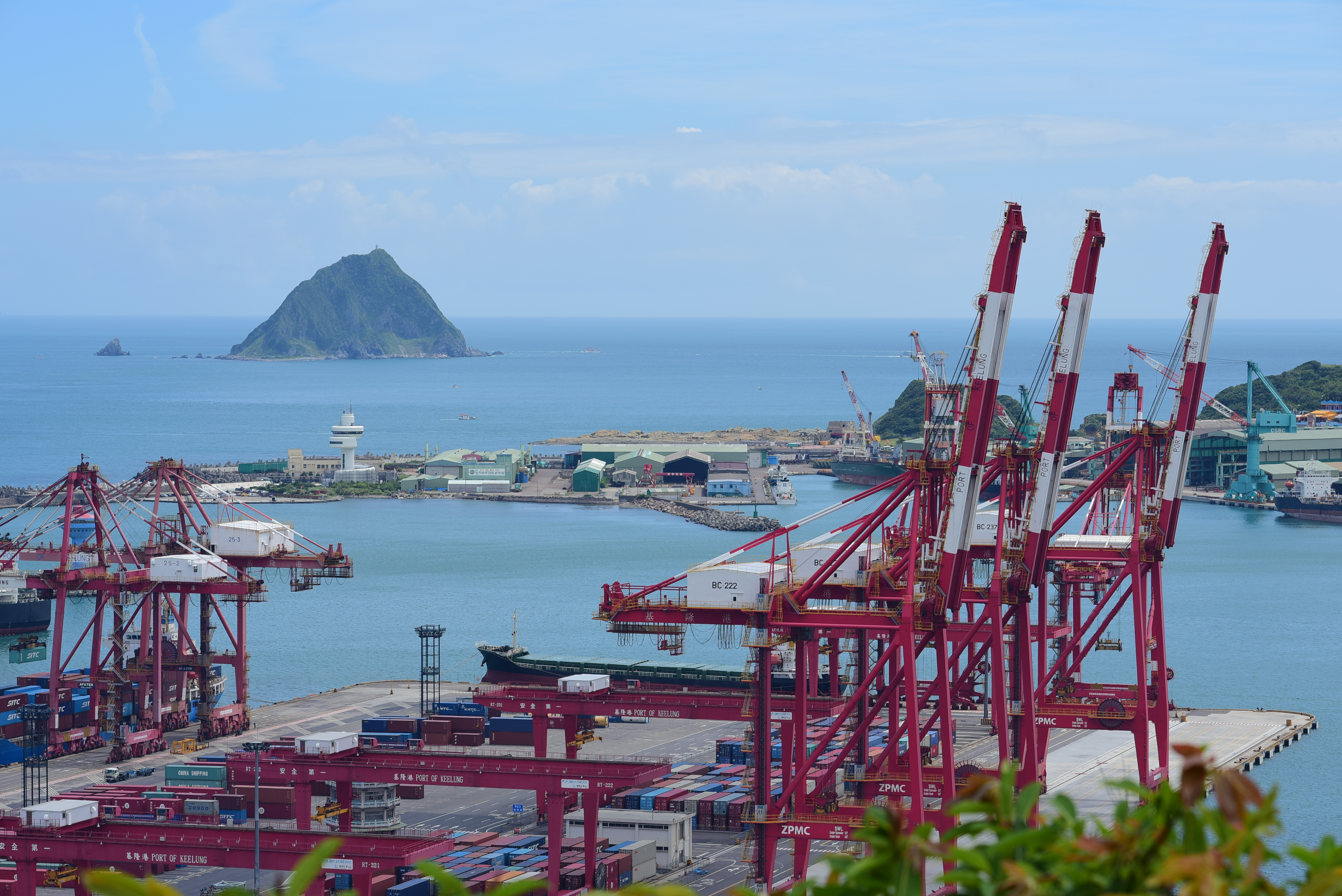
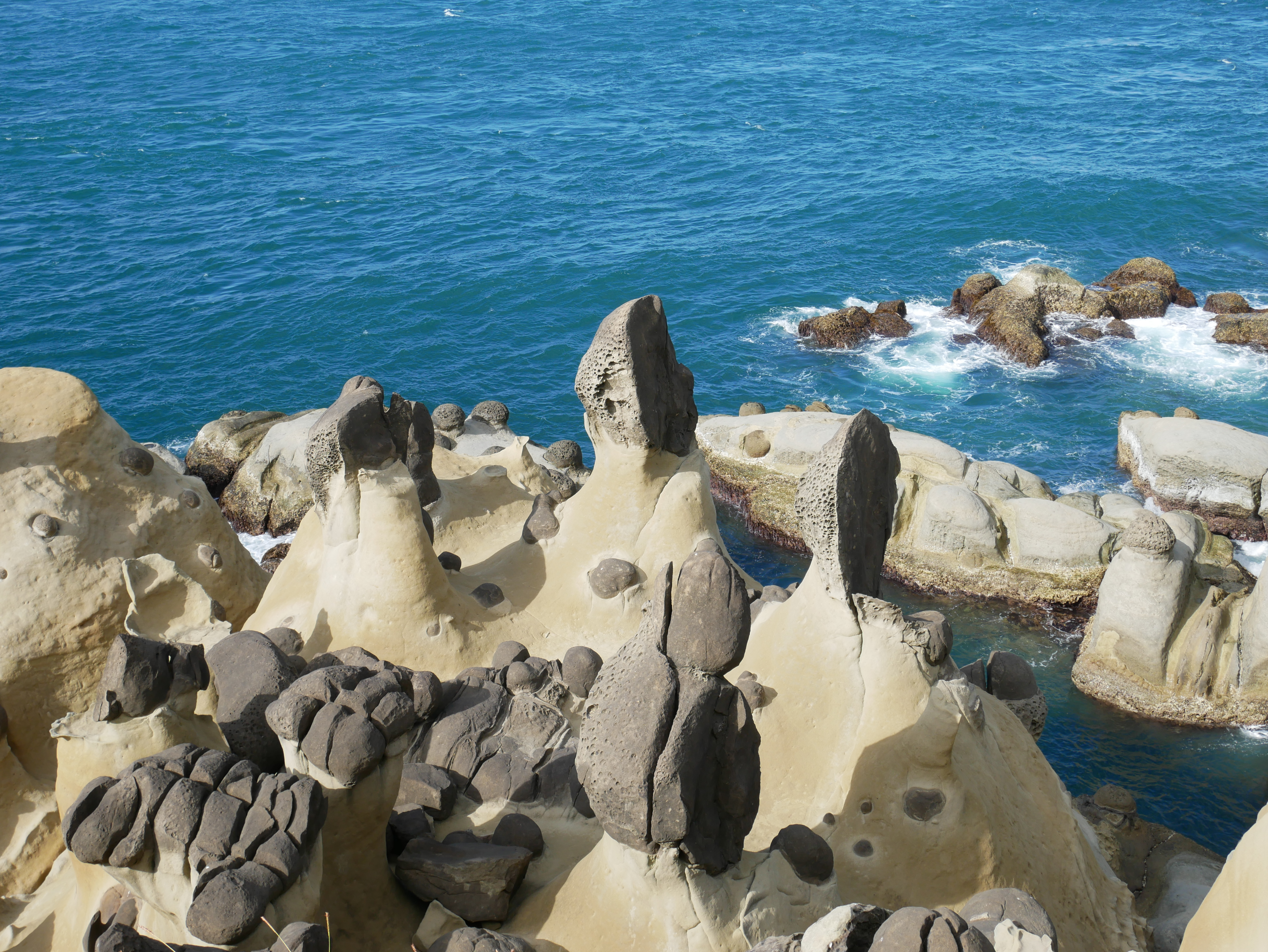
- Skyline of Central Keelung Dawulun Fort Zhengbin Fishing Port Keelung Outer Harbor and Keelung Islet Heping Island Park

- Flag Logo
- Nickname: The Rainy Port (雨港)
- Location in Taiwan
- Coordinates: 25°08′N 121°44′E
- Country: Republic of China (Taiwan)
- Province: Taiwan Province (nominally)
- Region: Northern Taiwan
- Districts: 7
- Founded as La Santisima Trinidad: 1626
- Part of Taihoku Prefecture: 17 April 1895
- Provincial city status: 11 November 1945
- City seat: Zhongzheng District

Government
  - Body: Keelung City Government; Keelung City Council
  - Mayor: George Hsieh (KMT)

Area
  - Total: 132.7589 km^{2} (51.2585 sq mi)
  - Rank: 18 of 22

Population (October 2023)
  - Total: 362,487
  - Rank: 16 of 22
  - Density: 2,730.42/km^{2} (7,071.74/sq mi)
- Time zone: UTC+8 (National Standard Time)
- Postal code: 200–206
- Area code: (0)32
- ISO 3166 code: TW-KEE
  - Bird: Eagle
  - Flower: Common crepe myrtle
  - Tree: Formosan Sweet-gum
- English: Keelung/KLC
- Chinese: 基隆/基市
- Website: www.klcg.gov.tw/tw/klcg1/

Keelung City

Chinese name
- Chinese: 基隆市
Transcriptions
Standard Mandarin
- Hanyu Pinyin: Jīlóng Shì
- Bopomofo: ㄐㄧ ㄌㄨㄥˊ ㄕˋ
- Gwoyeu Romatzyh: Jilong Shyh
- Wade–Giles: Chi^{1}-lung^{2} Shih^{4}
- Tongyong Pinyin: Jilóng Shìh
- Yale Romanization: Jīlúng Shr̀
- MPS2: Jīlúng Shr̀
- IPA: [tɕí.lʊ̌ŋ ʂɻ̩̂]
Hakka
- Pha̍k-fa-sṳ: Kî-lùng-sṳ
Yue: Cantonese
- Jyutping: gei1 lung4 si5
- IPA: [kej˥ lʊŋ˩ si˩˧]
Southern Min
- Hokkien POJ: Ke-lâng-chhī
- Tâi-lô: Ke-lâng-tshī

Taiwanese Hokkien Name
- Traditional Chinese: 雞籠市
- Simplified Chinese: 鸡笼市
Transcriptions
Standard Mandarin
- Hanyu Pinyin: Jīlóng Shì
Yue: Cantonese
- Jyutping: gaai1 lung4 si5
- IPA: [kaj˥ lʊŋ˩ si˩˧]
Southern Min
- Hokkien POJ: Ke-lâng-chhī/Koe-lâng-chhī

Japanese name
- Kanji: 基隆市
- Kana: キールンし
- Hiragana: きーるんし
- Katakana: キールンシ
Transcriptions
- Revised Hepburn: Kiirun-shi
- Kunrei-shiki: Kîrun-si

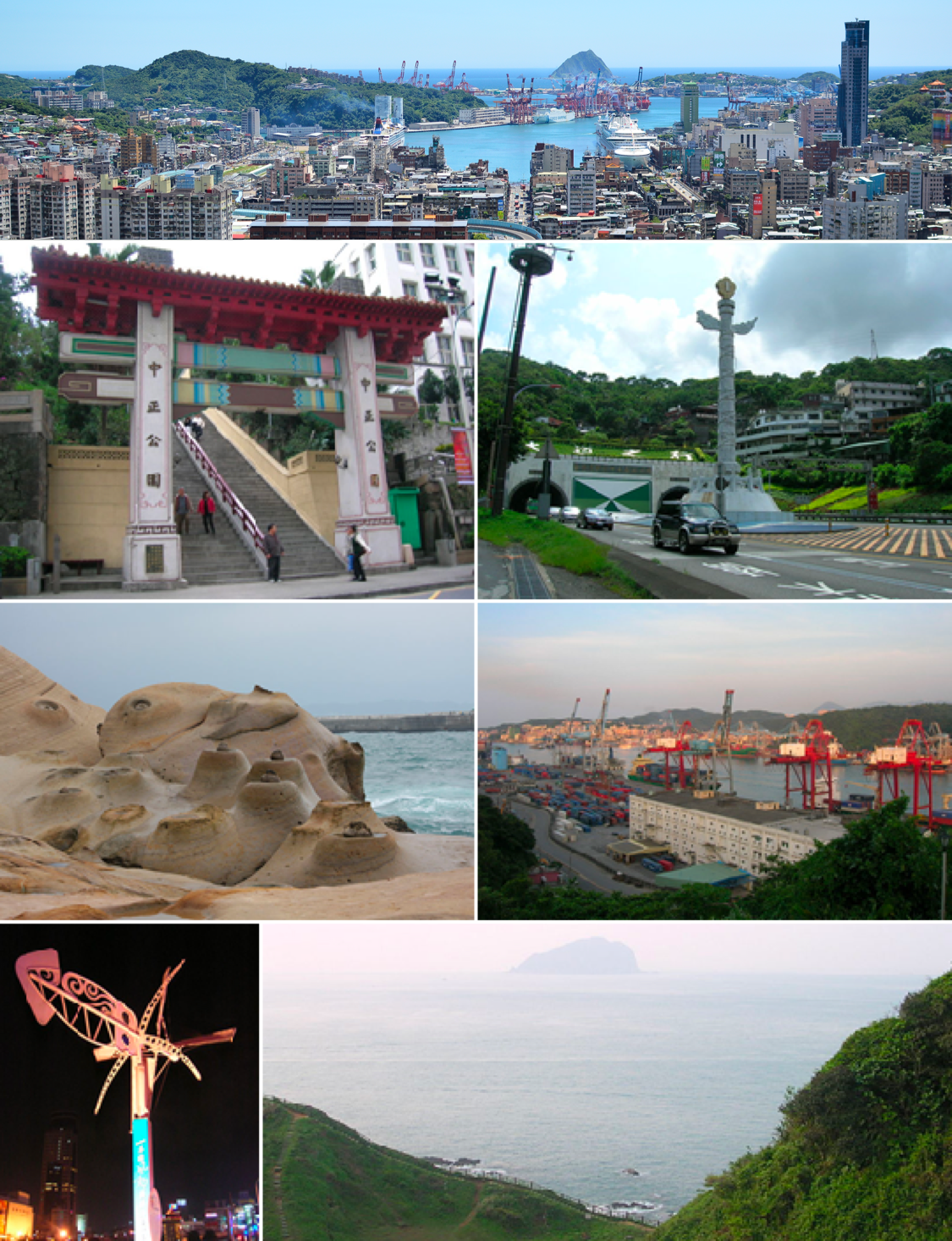
Above: Panoramic view of central Keelung and Keelung Port Second left: Main gate of Chung Cheng Park Second right: Start of Sun Yat-sen Freeway Third left: North coast of Keelung Third right: Keelung Port Bottom left: A windmill wind squid (Loliginidae) in Central Keelung Right: Keelung Islet

Keelung (/kiː.ˈlʊŋ/, kee-LUUNG; Chinese: 基隆; pinyin: Jīlóng; Pe̍h-ōe-jī: Ke-lâng), Chilung or Jilong (/dʒiː.ˈlʊŋ/, jee-LUUNG), officially known as Keelung City, is a major port city in northeastern Taiwan. The city is part of the Taipei–Keelung metropolitan area with neighboring New Taipei City and Taipei. Nicknamed the Rainy Port for its frequent rain and maritime role, the city is Taiwan's second largest seaport (after Kaohsiung), and was the world's 7th largest port in 1984.

In 1626, the Spanish established Fort San Salvador at present-day Keelung, an area inhabited by the Taiwanese indigenous peoples. Control of the area eventually passed to the Qing dynasty. Fighting between the Chinese and the Europeans around Keelung occurred in the 19th century during the First Opium War and the Sino-French War. The island of Taiwan was subsequently ceded to the Empire of Japan in 1895 after the First Sino-Japanese War; under Japanese rule the city was called Kirun. Keelung became part of Taiwan Province under the Republic of China after 1945. Administratively, the city became a first-level subdivision in 2018 after the provincial government was abolished.

== Name ==
According to early Chinese accounts, this northern coastal area was originally called Pak-kang (Chinese: 北港; Pe̍h-ōe-jī: Pak-káng). By the early 20th century, the city was known to the Western world as Kelung, as well as the variants Kiloung, Kilang and Keelung. In his 1903 general history of Taiwan, US Consul to Formosa (1898–1904) James W. Davidson related that "Kelung" was among the few well-known names, thus warranting no alternate Japanese romanization.

However, the Taiwanese people have long called the city Kelang (Chinese: 雞籠; Pe̍h-ōe-jī: Ke-lâng/Koe-lâng; lit. 'rooster cage', 'hencoop" or "chicken coop'). While it has been proposed that this name was derived from the local mountain that took the shape of a rooster cage, it is more likely that the name was derived from the first inhabitants of the region, as are the names of many other Taiwanese cities. In this case, the Ketagalan people were the first inhabitants, and early Han settlers probably approximated "Ketagalan" with Ke-lâng (Ketagalan: ke- -an, "domain marker circumfix" + Taiwanese Hokkien 儂／人; lâng; 'person'), with the noun root and the suffix part of the circumfix replaced together with the common Taiwanese Hokkien term for people, shortening the circumfix to just its prefix part.

In 1875, during the late Qing era, a new official name was given (Chinese: 基隆; pinyin: Jīlóng; lit. 'base prosperous'). In Mandarin, probably the working language of Chinese government at the time, both the old and new names were likely pronounced Gīlóng (hence "Keelung").

Under Japanese rule (1895–1945), the city was also known to the west by the Japanese romanization Kiirun.

In Taiwanese Hokkien, the native language of the area, the city is called Ke-lâng. In Hanyu Pinyin, the most common romanization system for Mandarin Chinese, the name of Keelung is written as Jīlóng (the shift from g [k] to j [t͡ɕ] is a recent development in the Beijing dialect; see Old Mandarin).

== History ==
=== Early history ===
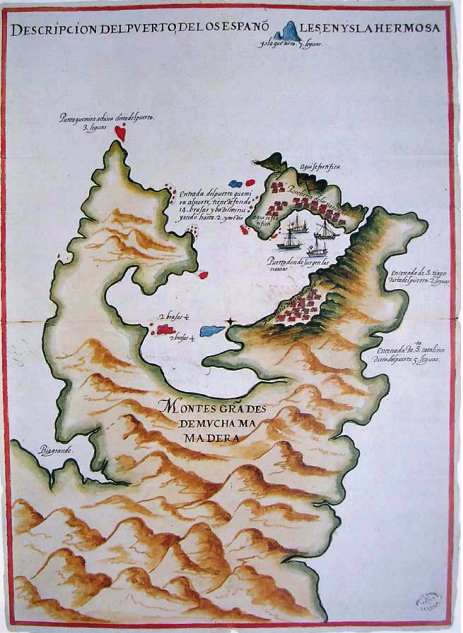
1626 Map of Keelung under Spanish Formosa

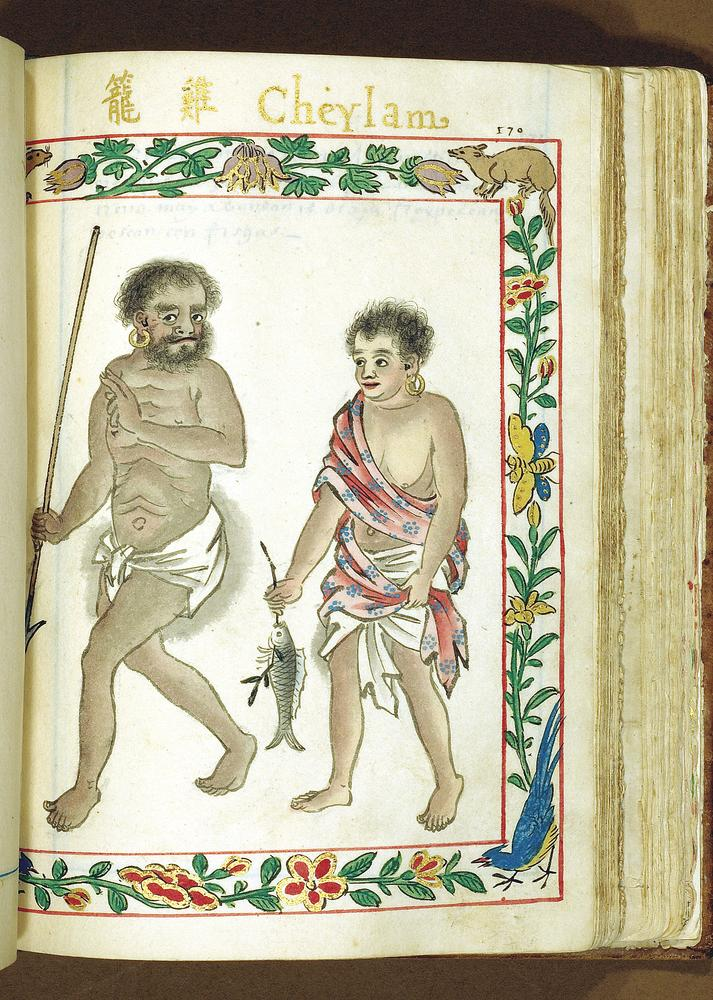
Taiwanese natives in Keelung under Spanish Formosa

Keelung was first inhabited by the Ketagalan, a tribe of Taiwanese aborigine. The Spanish expedition to Formosa in the early 17th century was its first contact with the West; by 1624 the Spanish had built San Salvador de Quelung, a fort in Keelung serving as an outpost of the Manila-based Spanish East Indies. The Spanish ruled it as a part of Spanish Formosa. Besides the native Taiwanese aborigines, the Spanish authorities from Spanish Manila settled North Taiwan (especially Keelung and Tamsui) with a mixture of Sangley Chinese (primarily Fujianese traders), Christian Japanese, native Filipinos (e.g. Kapampangan, Tagalogs, etc.) as merchants and laborers, and some Mexican Mestizos, Mulattos, Blacks, Mexican Amerindians as soldiers and laborers and a few Spanish Filipinos from Spanish Philippines and rarely Mexican Criollo Spaniards from New Spain (Mexico) as Catholic friar missionaries and colonial leaders, with the Latin Americans from New Spain (Mexico) brought over to North Taiwan from Manila through the Manila-Acapulco Galleons. From 1642 to 1661 and 1663–1668, Keelung was under Dutch control. The Dutch East India Company took over the Spanish Fort San Salvador at Santissima Trinidad. They reduced its size and renamed it Fort Noort-Hollant. The Dutch had three more minor fortifications in Keelung and also a little school and a preacher.

When Ming dynasty loyalist Koxinga successfully attacked the Dutch in southern Taiwan (Siege of Fort Zeelandia), the crew of the Keelung forts fled to the Dutch trading post in Japan. The Dutch came back in 1663 and re-occupied and strengthened their earlier forts. However, trade with Qing China through Keelung was not what they hoped it would be and, in 1668, they left after getting harassed by aboriginals.

=== Qing dynasty ===
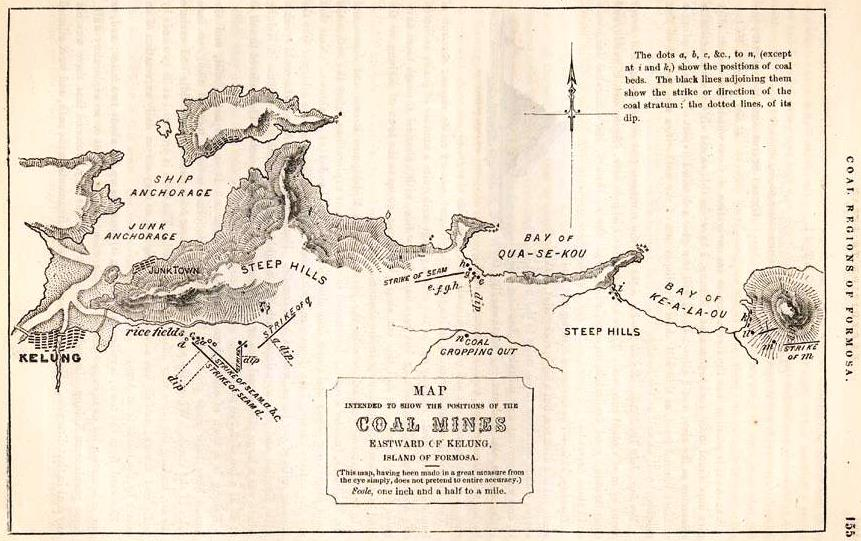
Map of Keelung in 1856

==== First Opium War ====
During the First Opium War, the British merchant ship Nerbudda shipwrecked near the port of Keelung due to a typhoon in September 1841. Several months later, another British merchantman, the brig Ann, also shipwrecked near Keelung on March 1842. Hundreds of survivors from both ships were captured by Chinese authorities and transferred to Taiwan. Two senior Chinese officials, Dahonga and Yao Ying, filed a false report to the Daoguang Emperor, claiming to have beaten off a British attack against Keelung. In October 1841, the Royal Navy sloop HMS Nimrod sailed to Keelung to search for survivors of Nerbudda, but after they found out the Chinese sent them south for imprisonment, Nimrod bombarded the city's port, destroying 27 cannon before returning to British Hong Kong. Most of the survivors—over 130 from the Nerbudda and 54 from the Ann—were summarily executed by the Chinese in August 1842.

In 1863, the Qing Empire opened up Keelung as a trading port and the city enjoyed rapid development due to the abundant commodities such as placer gold and high quality coal found in the drainage area of Keelung River. In 1875, Taipeh Prefecture was created and included Keelung. In 1878, Keelung was formed into a ting or sub-prefecture. Around the same time, the name was changed from Ke-lang (雞籠廳) to Kilong (基隆廳), which means "rich and prosperous land".

The city suffered serious damage and lost hundreds of inhabitants during an earthquake and tsunami in 1867. The earthquake had an estimated magnitude of 7.0 and was caused by movement on a nearby fault.

==== Sino-French War ====
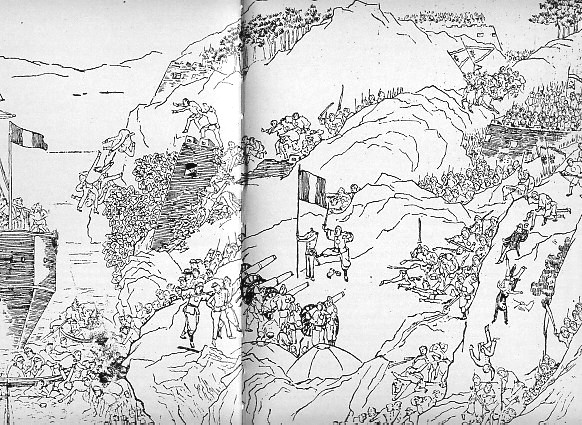
French forces landed at Keelung on 1 October 1884.

During the Sino-French War (1884–85), the French attempted an invasion of Taiwan during the Keelung Campaign. Liu Mingchuan, who led the defence of Taiwan, recruited Aboriginals to serve alongside the Chinese soldiers in fighting against the French of Colonel Jacques Duchesne's Formosa Expeditionary Corps. The French were defeated at the Battle of Tamsui and the Qing forces pinned the French down at Keelung in an eight-month-long campaign before the French withdrew.

=== Empire of Japan ===
A systematic city development started during the Japanese Era, after the 1895 Treaty of Shimonoseki, which handed all Taiwan over to Japan. A five-phase construction of Keelung Harbor was initiated, and in by 1916 trade volume had exceeded even those of Tamsui and Kaohsiung Harbors to become one of the major commercial harbors of Taiwan.

Keelung was governed as Kīrun town (基隆街), Kīrun District, Taihoku Prefecture in 1920 and was upgraded to a city in 1924. The Pacific War broke out in 1941, and Keelung became one of the first targets of Allied bombers and was nearly destroyed as a result.

=== Republic of China ===
After the handover of Taiwan from Japan to the Republic of China in October 1945, Keelung was established as a provincial city of Taiwan Province. The Keelung City Government worked with the Keelung Harbor Bureau to rebuild the city and the harbor and by 1984, the harbor became the 7th largest container harbor in the world. The city became directly governed by the Executive Yuan after Taiwan Province was streamlined in 1998 and became a de facto first level division in 2018 following the dissolution of the Taiwan Provincial Government.

== Geography ==
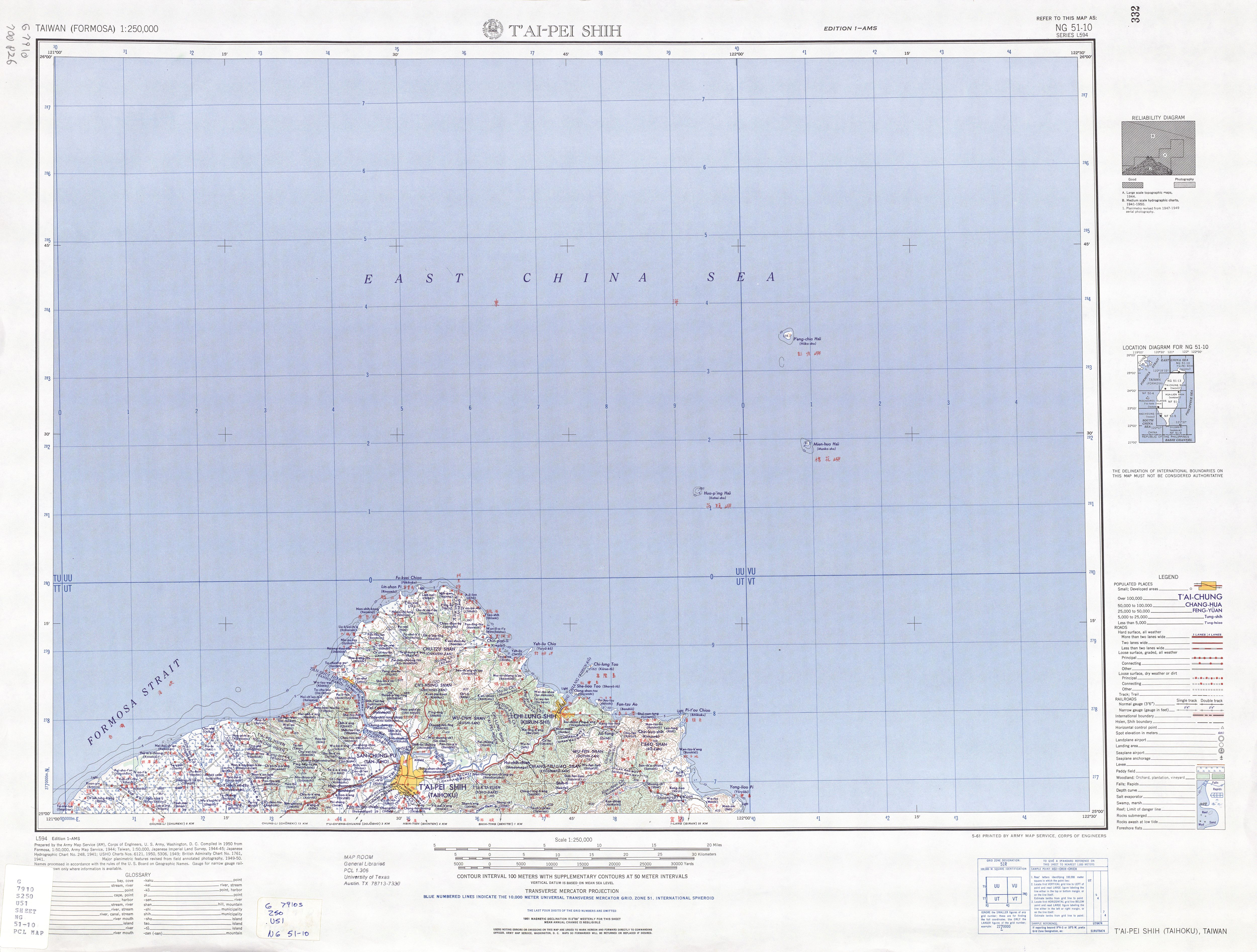
Map of Keelung (labeled as CHI-LUNG-SHIH (KIIRUN-SHI) 基隆市) area (1950)

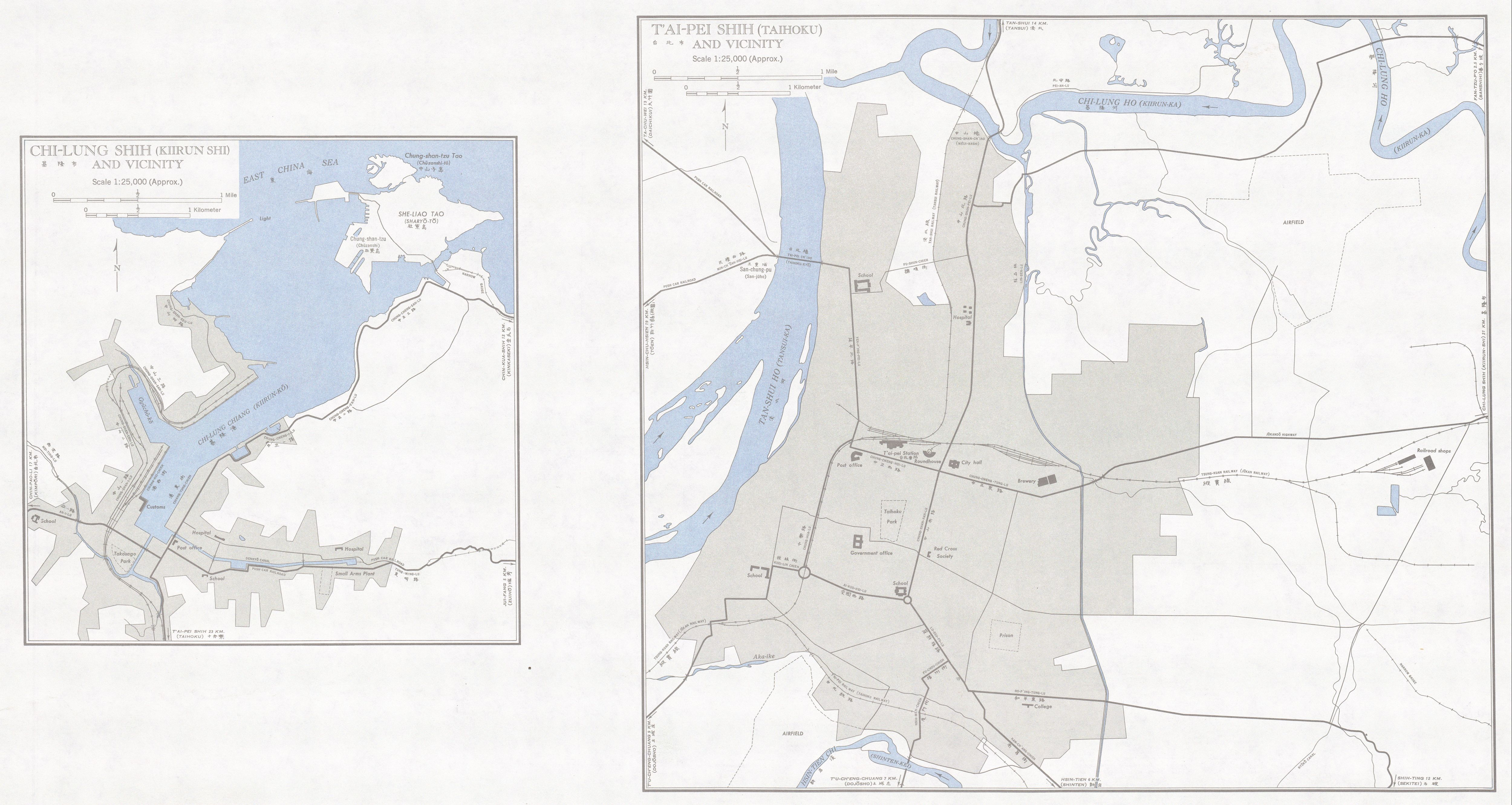
Map of Keelung (labeled as CHI-LUNG SHIH (KIIRUN SHI) 基隆市) and vicinity (1950s)

Keelung City is located in the northern part of Taiwan Island. It occupies an area of 132.76 km^{2} (51.26 sq mi) and is separated from its neighboring county by mountains in the east, west and south. The northern part of the city faces the ocean and is a great deep water harbor since early times. Keelung also administers the nearby Keelung Islet as well as the more distant and strategically important Pengjia Islet, Mianhua Islet and Huaping Islet.

=== Climate ===
Keelung has a humid subtropical climate (Köppen Cfa) with a yearly rainfall average upwards of 3,700 millimetres (146 in). It has long been noted as one of the wettest and gloomiest cities in the world; the effect is related to the Kuroshio Current. Although it is one of the coolest cities of Taiwan, winters are still short and warm, whilst summers are long, relatively dry and hot, temperatures can peek above 26 °C during a warm winter day, while it can dip below 27 °C during a rainy summer day, much like the rest of northern Taiwan. However its location on northern mountain slopes means that due to orographic lift, rainfall is heavier during fall and winter, the latter during which a northeasterly flow prevails. During summer, southwesterly winds dominate and thus there is a slight rain shadow effect. Fog is most serious during winter and spring, when relative humidity levels are also highest.In June 2017, the city experienced severe flooding during the June 2017 Taiwan rainstorm.

Climate data for Keelung (1991–2020 normals, extremes 1946–present）
Month	Jan	Feb	Mar	Apr	May	Jun	Jul	Aug	Sep	Oct	Nov	Dec	Year
Record high °C (°F)	32.1 (89.8)	31.2 (88.2)	33.0 (91.4)	35.2 (95.4)	37.3 (99.1)	37.6 (99.7)	38.8 (101.8)	38.5 (101.3)	37.0 (98.6)	34.3 (93.7)	32.4 (90.3)	30.0 (86.0)	38.8 (101.8)
Mean daily maximum °C (°F)	18.4 (65.1)	19.1 (66.4)	21.0 (69.8)	24.7 (76.5)	28.0 (82.4)	31.2 (88.2)	33.3 (91.9)	32.5 (90.5)	29.8 (85.6)	26.1 (79.0)	23.6 (74.5)	20.1 (68.2)	25.7 (78.2)
Daily mean °C (°F)	16.1 (61.0)	16.4 (61.5)	18.1 (64.6)	21.6 (70.9)	24.8 (76.6)	27.6 (81.7)	29.5 (85.1)	29.1 (84.4)	27.2 (81.0)	24.2 (75.6)	21.5 (70.7)	18.0 (64.4)	22.8 (73.1)
Mean daily minimum °C (°F)	14.2 (57.6)	14.3 (57.7)	15.7 (60.3)	19.0 (66.2)	22.3 (72.1)	25.0 (77.0)	26.7 (80.1)	26.5 (79.7)	25.0 (77.0)	22.4 (72.3)	19.6 (67.3)	16.1 (61.0)	20.6 (69.0)
Record low °C (°F)	3.9 (39.0)	5.6 (42.1)	3.9 (39.0)	9.2 (48.6)	13.9 (57.0)	16.7 (62.1)	21.4 (70.5)	20.1 (68.2)	17.1 (62.8)	12.2 (54.0)	9.7 (49.5)	4.6 (40.3)	3.9 (39.0)
Average precipitation mm (inches)	327.8 (12.91)	349.8 (13.77)	274.4 (10.80)	211.0 (8.31)	284.1 (11.19)	290.4 (11.43)	119.5 (4.70)	211.4 (8.32)	390.1 (15.36)	377.6 (14.87)	396.9 (15.63)	356.6 (14.04)	3,589.6 (141.33)
Average precipitation days (≥ 0.1 mm)	19.6	17.9	18.7	16.0	16.1	14.8	8.5	11.6	15.2	17.1	18.6	19.5	193.6
Average relative humidity (%)	78.5	79.5	79.0	77.4	77.4	76.9	71.9	73.6	75.3	75.6	77.1	76.6	76.6
Mean monthly sunshine hours	52.6	57.9	80.6	91.2	111.9	138.4	229.2	208.2	147.4	85.7	65.3	48.5	1,316.9
Source: Central Weather Bureau

== Administration ==
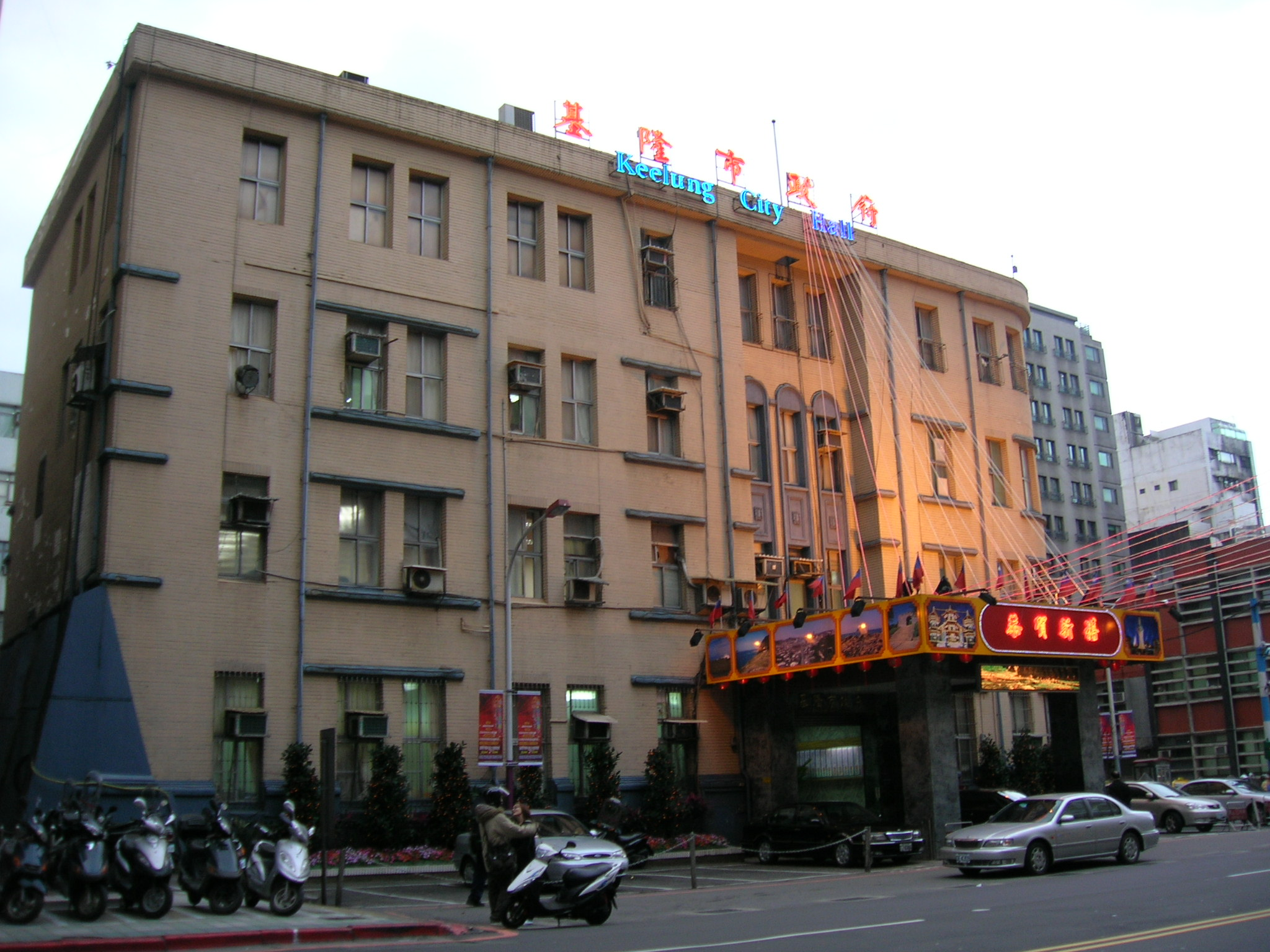
Keelung City Hall in Zhongzheng District

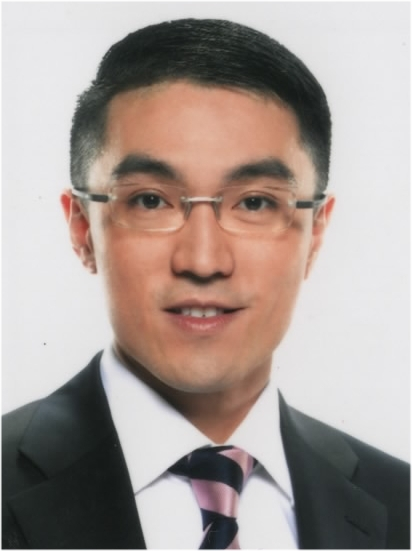
George Hsieh, the incumbent Mayor of Keelung City

Zhongzheng District is the seat of Keelung City which houses the Keelung City Government and Keelung City Council. The current Mayor of Keelung is George Hsieh of the Kuomintang.

=== Administrative divisions ===
Keelung has seven (7) districts:

Map	Name	Chinese	Taiwanese	Hakka	Population (October 2023)	Area (km²)
	Zhongzheng	中正區	Tiong-chèng	Tsûng-tsang	50,693	10.2118
	Zhongshan	中山區	Tiong-san	Tsûng-sân	45,523	10.5238
	Ren-ai	仁愛區	Jîn-ài	Yìn-oi	41,159	4.2335
	Xinyi (Sinyi)	信義區	Sìn-gī	Sin-ngi	53,399	10.6706
	Anle	安樂區	An-lo̍k	Ôn-lo̍k	80,452	18.0250
	Nuannuan	暖暖區	Loán-loán	Nôn-nôn	38,455	22.8283
	Qidu	七堵區	Chhit-tó͘	Tshit-tù	52,806	56.2659

=== Politics ===
Keelung City is represented in the Legislative Yuan by Lin Pei-hsiang, or Jonathan Lin, of the Kuomintang, who was elected in 2024.

== Demographics ==
Historical population
Year	Pop.	±%
1946	62,812	—
1950	145,405	+131.5%
1955	187,468	+28.9%
1960	234,442	+25.1%
1965	278,320	+18.7%
1970	324,040	+16.4%
1975	341,383	+5.4%
1980	344,867	+1.0%
1985	351,524	+1.9%
1990	352,919	+0.4%
1995	368,771	+4.5%
2000	388,425	+5.3%
2005	390,633	+0.6%
2010	384,134	−1.7%
2015	372,105	−3.1%
2020	367,577	−1.2%
2025	359,836	−2.1%
Source: 基隆市志, Keelung City Government and Ministry of the Interior.

Keelung became the “loneliest” city in Taiwan in 2024, with more than 41 percent of its households comprising one person living alone. Indigenous peoples made up 3,617 of its households.

View source data.

=== Population growth ===
Year	Population	Notes
1840	700 households	
1897	9,500	
1904	17,710	Ranked 6th
1924	58,000	
1943	100,000	
1944	92,000	Decrease due to Allied air bombings
1948	130,000	28,000 mainlander influx
1970	324,040	
1990	352,919	
2010	384,134	
2020	367,577	

=== Festivals ===
One of the most popular festivals in Taiwan is the mid-summer Ghost Festival. The Keelung Ghost Festival is among the oldest and largest in Taiwan, dating back to 1855 after bitter clashes between rival clans, which claimed many lives before mediators stepped in. A truce was negotiated and the two sides agreed to bury their dead together and to maintain communal peace through competition in folk performances. The Keelung Ghost Festival is the first folklore custom to be included in Taiwan's national cultural heritage list. Today, the festivities are organized on a rotation basis by the city's 15 major clan associations, which are formed by people sharing the same surname. The highlight of the festival comes on the evening of the 14th day of the Ghost Month. Clan associations display elaborate floats in a parade, which culminates in the release of lit water lanterns into the sea to honor the dead. The event has become a major attraction drawing visitors from home and abroad.

== Economy ==
When Taiwan shifted from import substitution to an export-oriented economy after the Second World War, Keelung became increasingly important for foreign trade, serving as a major logistics hub in northern Taiwan and a crucial point for international shipping. As Taiwan’s trade volume rose steadily in the 1970s, transport, warehousing, customs brokerage, and other ports logistics services expanded in Keelung, as did the shipbuilding and ship maintenance industry. The city developed quickly and by 1984, the Port of Keelung became the 7th largest container port in the world.

However, in the 1990s, Keelung Port’s overall throughput began to decline as a result of intense domestic and international competition and geographical constraints limiting its expansion. The port gradually opened to tourism. It attracted major cruise operators such as Star Cruises, Princess Cruises, Royal Caribbean, and Costa Cruises, positioning itself as a home port for cruise liners. In 2017, Keelung earned the title of Asia’s best cruise home port at the Asia Cruise Forum Jeju in South Korea. At the same event five years later, Keelung won a Special Achievement Award from Jeju-based Asia Cruise Leaders Network for its post-pandemic business recovery. In 2024, Keelung Port recorded 331 cruise calls and served 787,000 passengers. Although the figures had yet to reach the 2019 level before the COVID-19 pandemic, there was a slight increase in the number of foreign visitors.

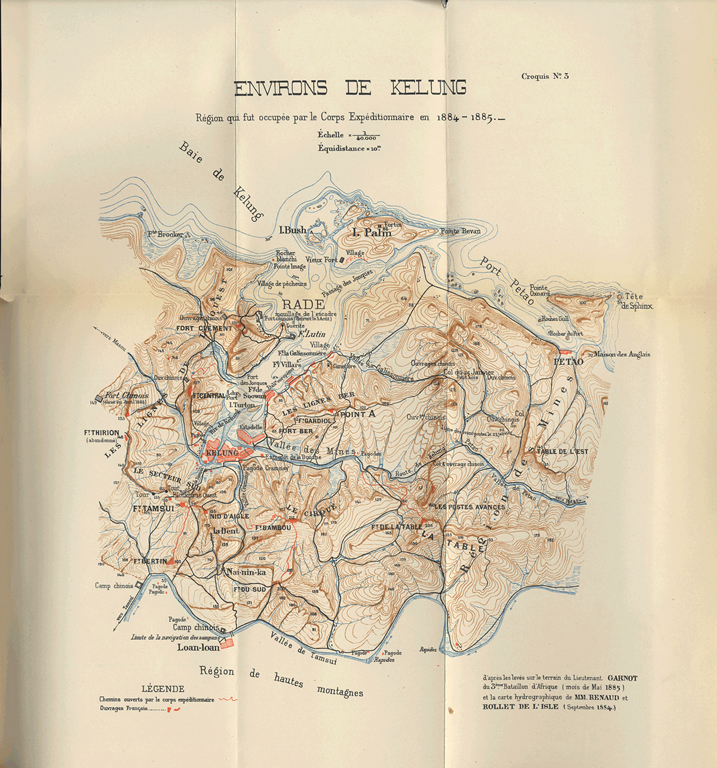
Keelung Port Croquis (in 1894)

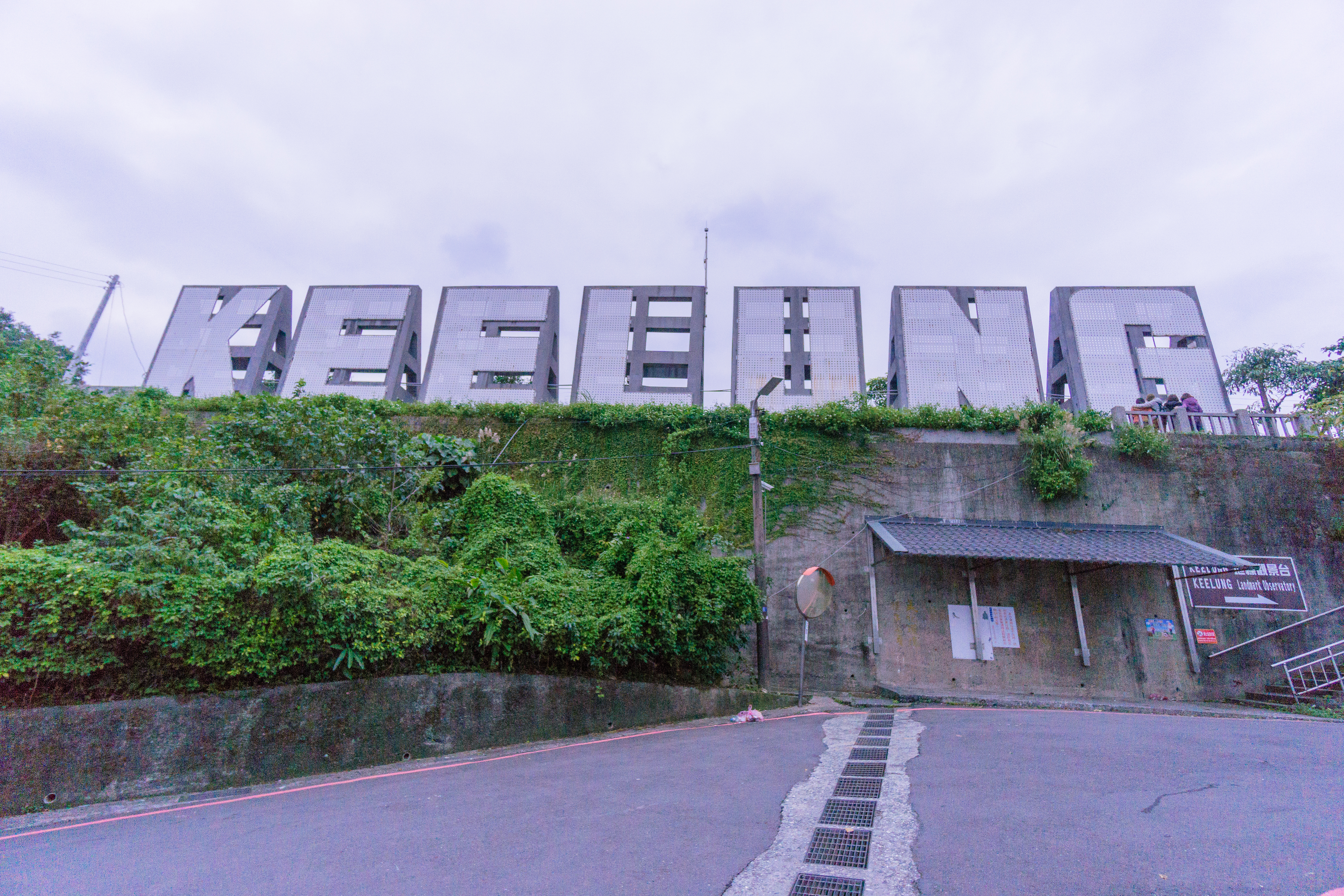
Keelung Landmark

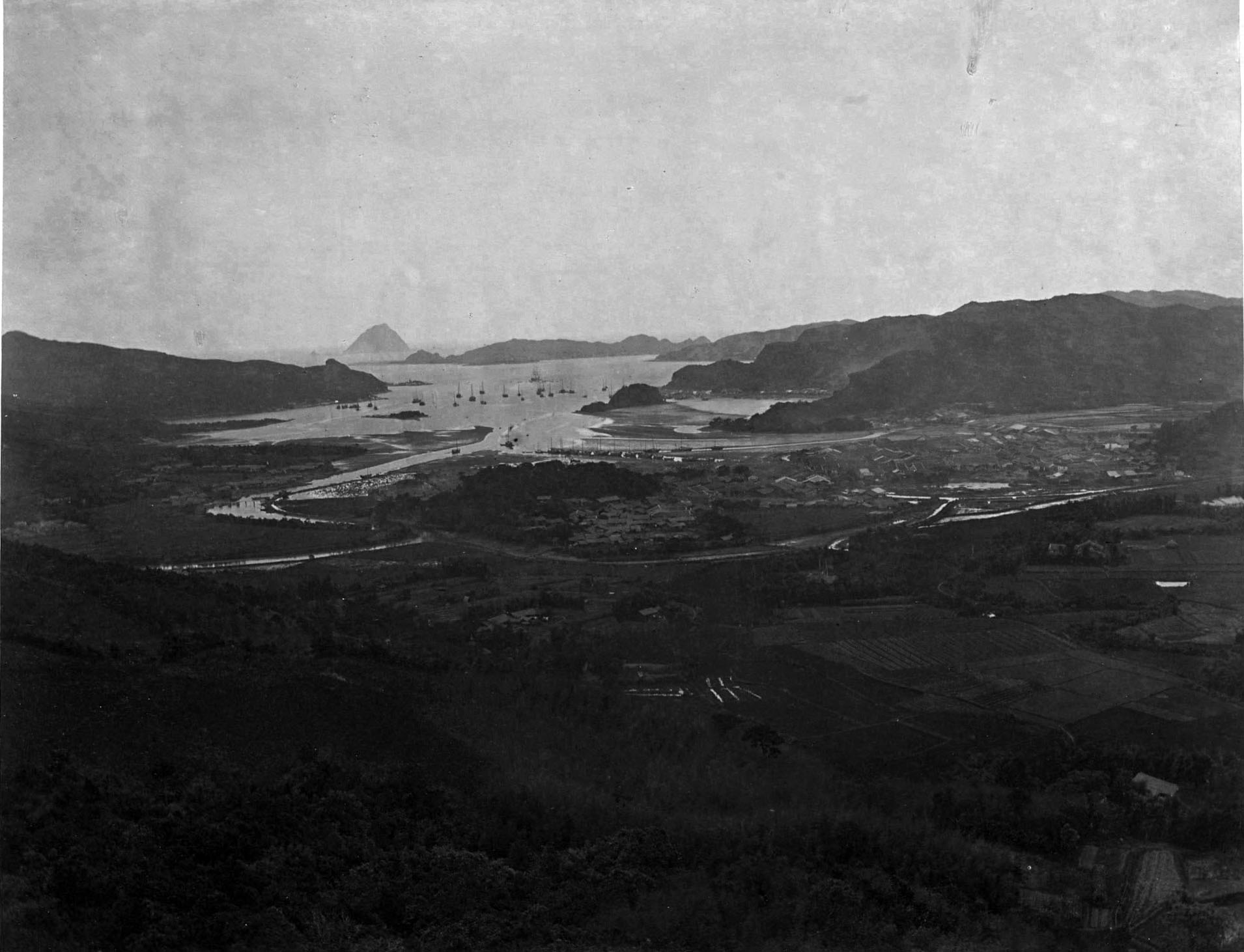
Keelung City and Harbor, between 1860 and 1880
Panorama view of central Keelung and harbor area

== Education ==
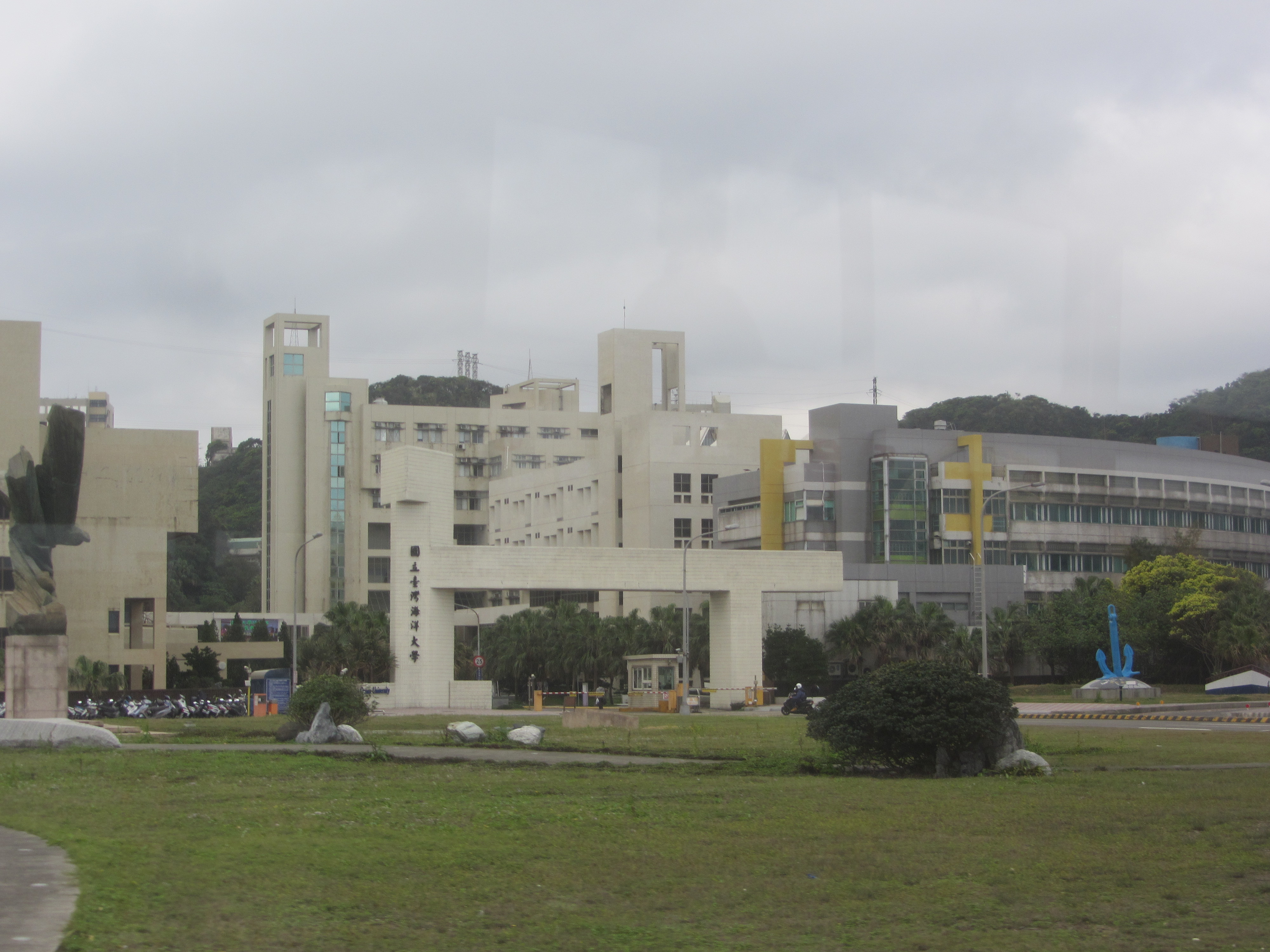
National Taiwan Ocean University

Education in Keelung City is governed by the Department of Education of Keelung City Government.

=== Universities and colleges ===
Keelung City houses three universities and colleges, namely the National Taiwan Ocean University, Deh Yu College of Nursing and Health and Chungyu University of Film and Arts.

About 45 percent of city residents aged 15 and above have a bachelor’s degree.

=== High schools ===
Keelung has 12 senior high schools—eight public and four private, which are attended by about 7,000 students.

- National Keelung Girls' Senior High School
- National Keelung Senior High School
- National Keelung Maritime Vocational High School
- National Keelung Commercial & Industrial Vocational Senior High School
- Er Xin Senior High School
- Keelung Fu Jen Sacred Heart Senior High School
- Kuang-Lung Home and Commerce Vocational High School
- Pei Teh Industrial and Home Economics Vocational High School
- Keelung Municipal Zhong Shan Senior High School
- Keelung Municipal Anle Senior High School

== Energy ==
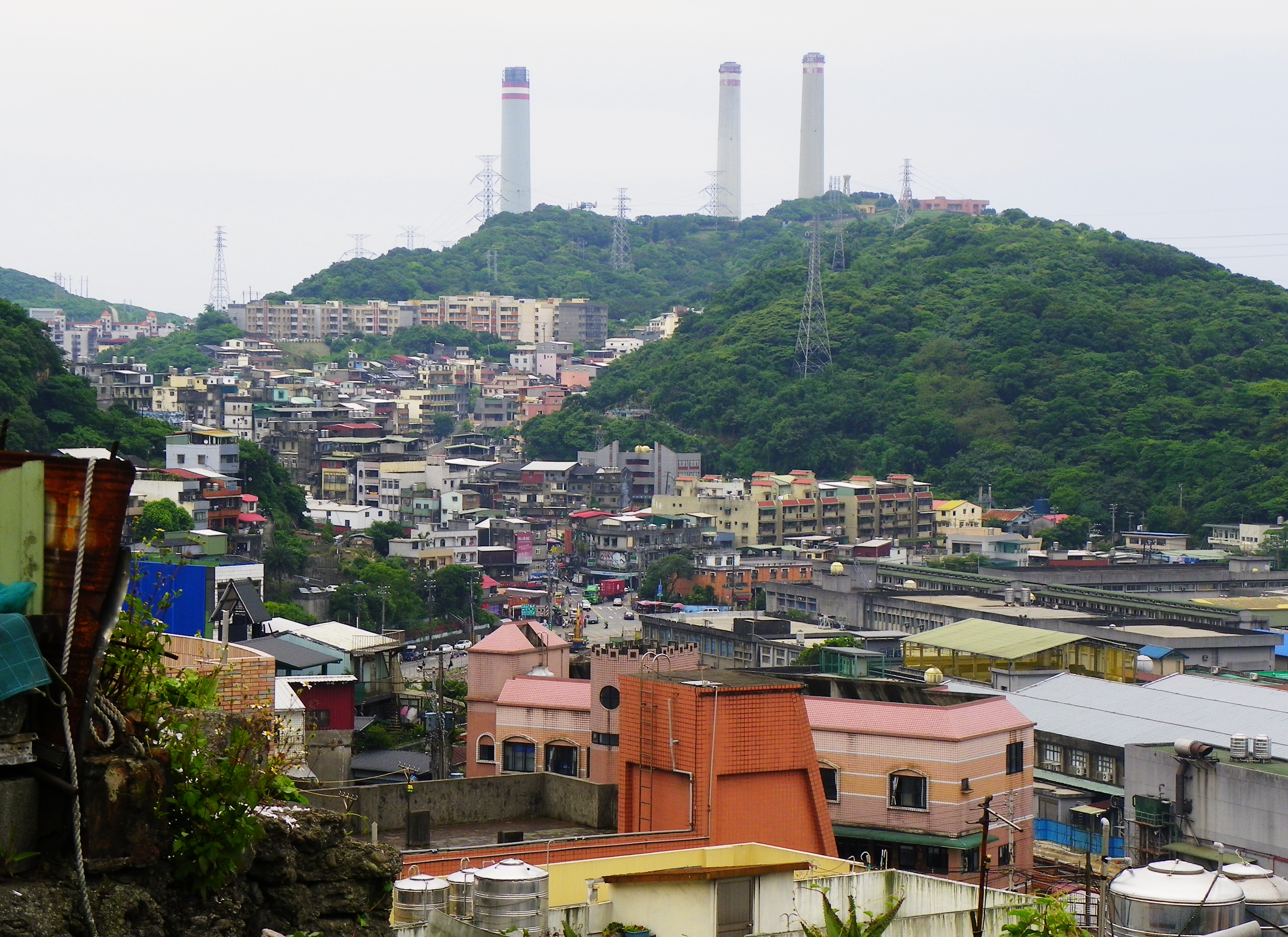
Hsieh-ho Power Plant

Keelung City houses the only fully oil-fired power plant in Taiwan, the Hsieh-ho Power Plant, which is located in Zhongshan District. The installed capacity of the power plant is 2,000 MW.

== Tourist attractions ==
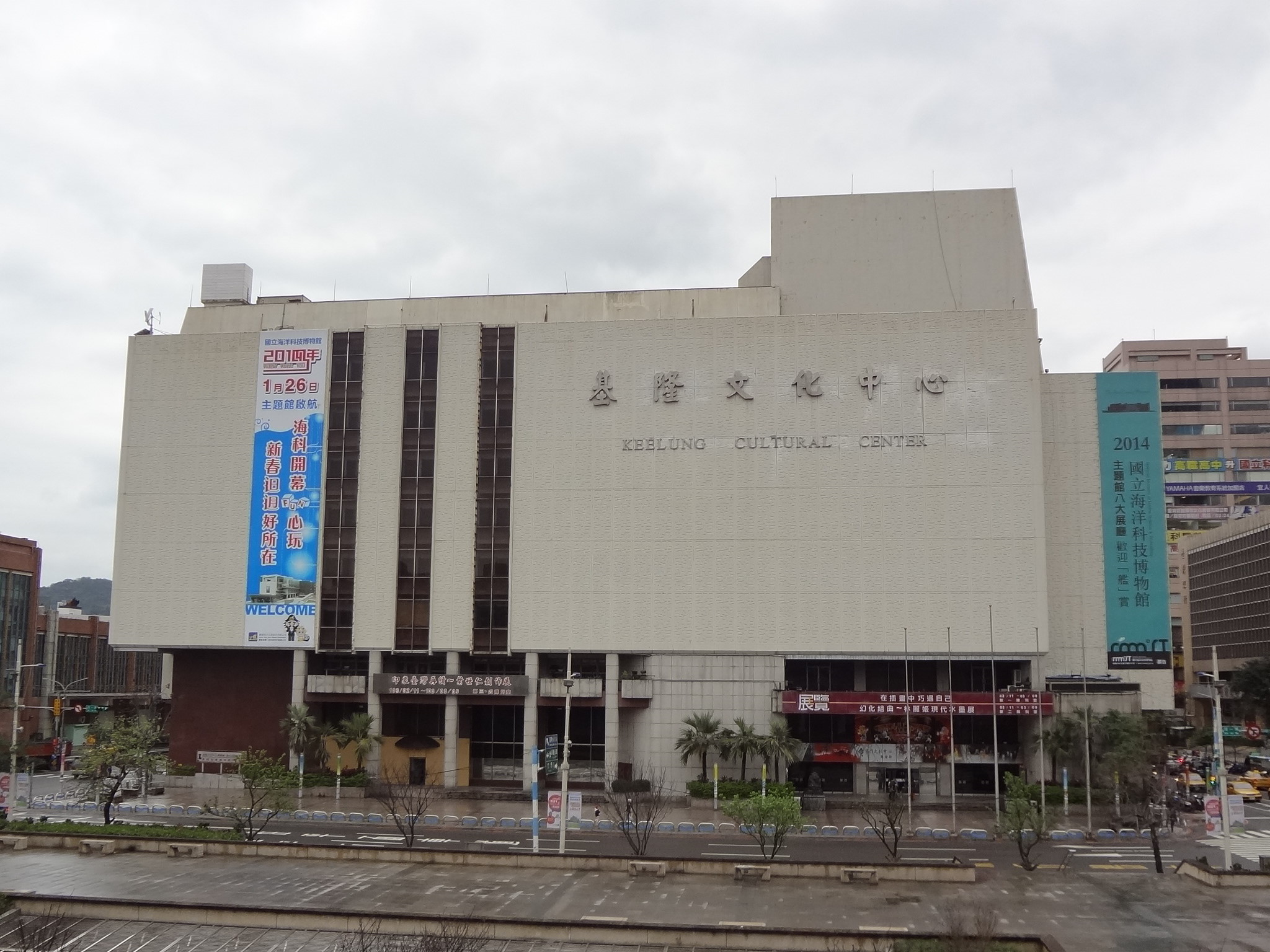
Keelung Cultural Center

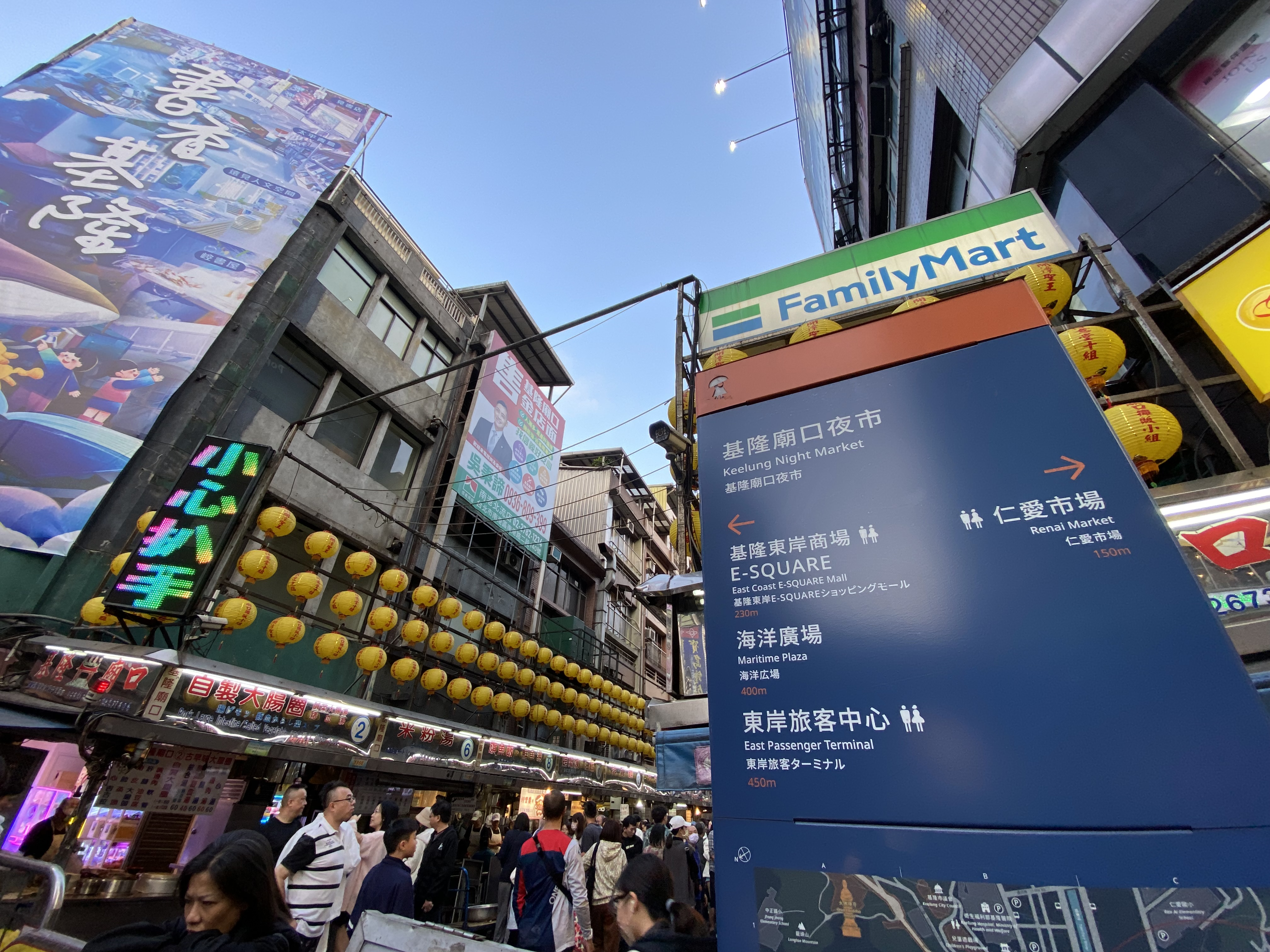
Miaokou Night Market

=== Ports ===
- Badouzi Fishing Port
- Bisha Fishing Port
- Port of Keelung
- Zhengbin Fishing Port

=== Parks ===
- Zhongzheng Park
- Heping Island Park

=== Cultural centers ===
- Embrace Cultural and Creative Park
- Keelung Cultural Center
- Keelung City Indigenous Cultural Hall

=== Museums ===
- National Museum of Marine Science and Technology
- YM Oceanic Culture and Art Museum

=== Historical structures ===
Baimiweng Fort, Dawulun Fort, Gongzi Liao Fort, Keelung Fort Commander's Official Residence, Nuannuan Ande Temple, Pengjia Lighthouse, Uhrshawan Battery and Xian Dong Yan.

=== Night markets ===
Keelung Miaokou Night Market

== Transportation ==
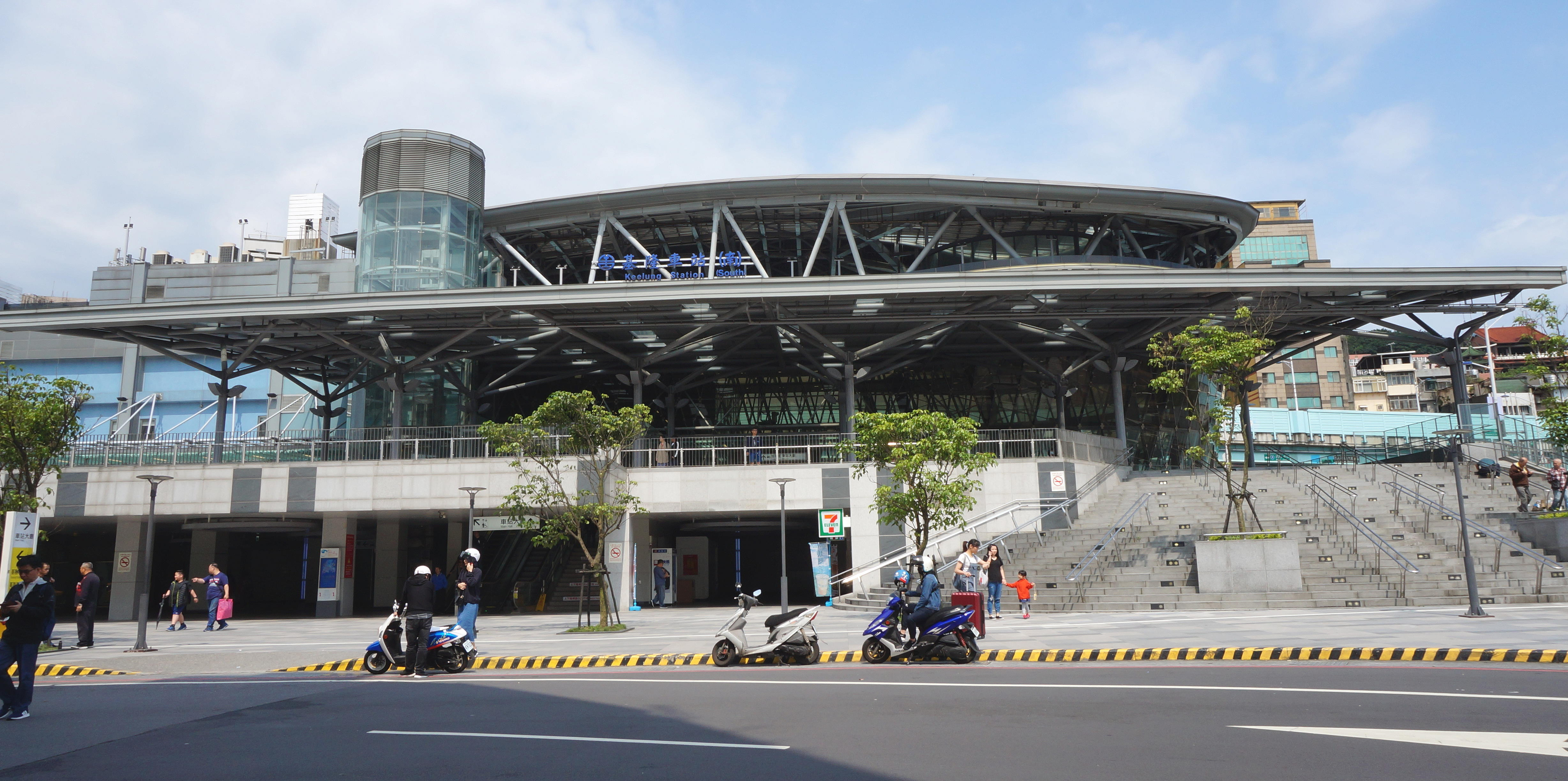
Keelung Station

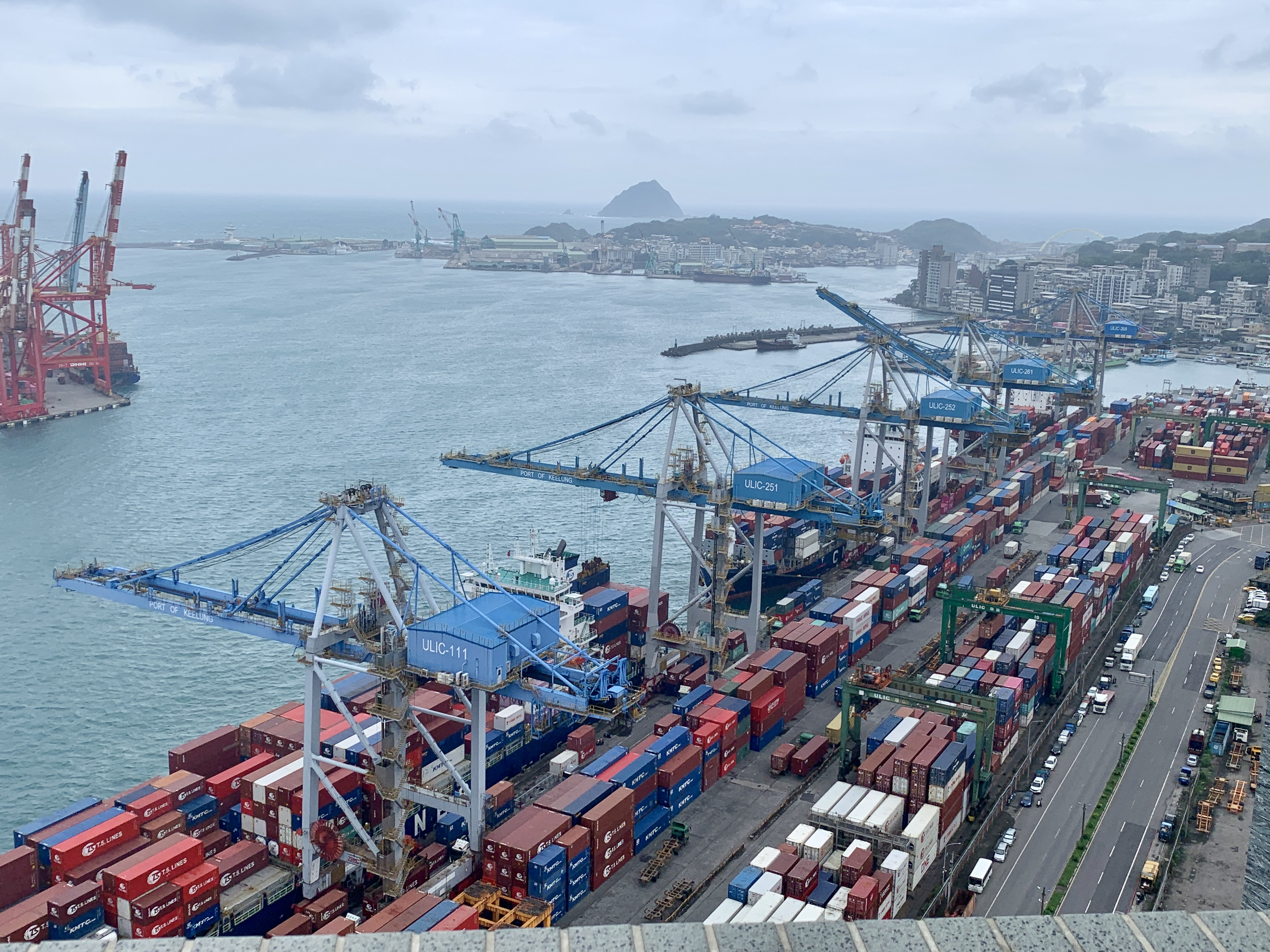
Port of Keelung

Keelung is easily accessible by train, bus, and freeway. It is about a half-hour drive from Taipei via National Freeway 1 and 3. Taiwan Railway commuter trains from Taipei to the Keelung Main Station take about 40 minutes. Intercity buses serve multiple points within the city.

=== Rail ===
- Taiwan Railway: Keelung, Sankeng, Badu, Qidu, Baifu, Nuannuan
  - Shen'ao line: Haikeguan, Badouzi

=== Water ===
Taiwan's second largest port, the Port of Keelung, is located in the city. The port serves destinations to Matsu Islands, Xiamen and Okinawa.

== International relations ==
=== Twin towns – Sister cities ===
Keelung is twinned with:

- Bacolod and Davao City, Philippines
- Bikini Atoll, Marshall Islands
- Campbell, California, U.S.
- Corpus Christi, Texas, U.S.
- East London, South Africa
- Marrickville, New South Wales, Australia
- Miyakojima, Okinawa, Japan
- Rosemead, California, U.S.
- Salt Lake City, Utah, U.S.
- Sangju, North Gyeongsang, South Korea
- Thunder Bay, Ontario, Canada
- Yakima, Washington, U.S.

== Notable people ==
Notable people from Keelung include:

- Chen Ti, Taiwanese tennis player
- Zero Chou, Taiwanese director
- Jiang Yi-huah, Premier of the Republic of China
- Show Lo, Taiwanese entertainer
- Danson Tang, Taiwanese Mandopop singer
- Yi Huan, Taiwanese comic creator/animator
- Feng-hsuing Hsu, American-Taiwanese computer scientist
- Hsie Zhen-Wu, Taiwanese TV presenter/lawyer
- Jaw Shaw-kong, Member of the Legislative Yuan

== See also ==
- Asteroid 237164 Keelung named for the city in 2018
- List of cities in the Republic of China (Taiwan)
- Administrative divisions of the Republic of China
