= Keelung City Government =

Government of Keelung City, Taiwan

Coordinates: 25.1316°N 121.7446°E

- 基隆市政府
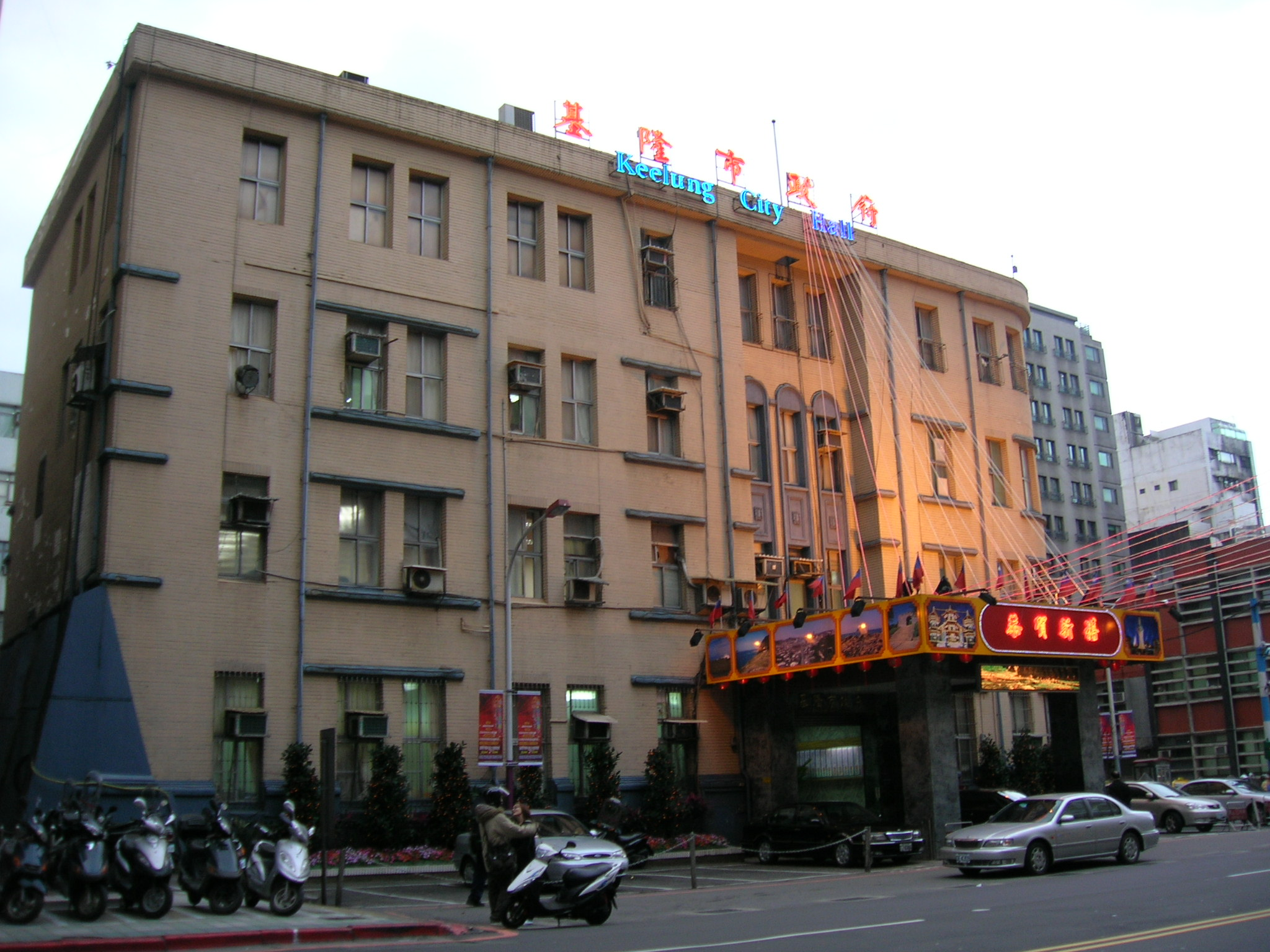

Agency overview
- Formed: 11 November 1945
- Jurisdiction: Keelung City
- Headquarters: Zhongzheng District
- Agency executives: George Hsieh, Mayor; QIU PEI-LIN, Deputy Mayor
- Website: Official website

The Keelung City Government (KLCG; Chinese: 基隆市政府; pinyin: Jīlóng Shì Zhèngfǔ) is the municipal government of Keelung, Taiwan.

== Organization ==
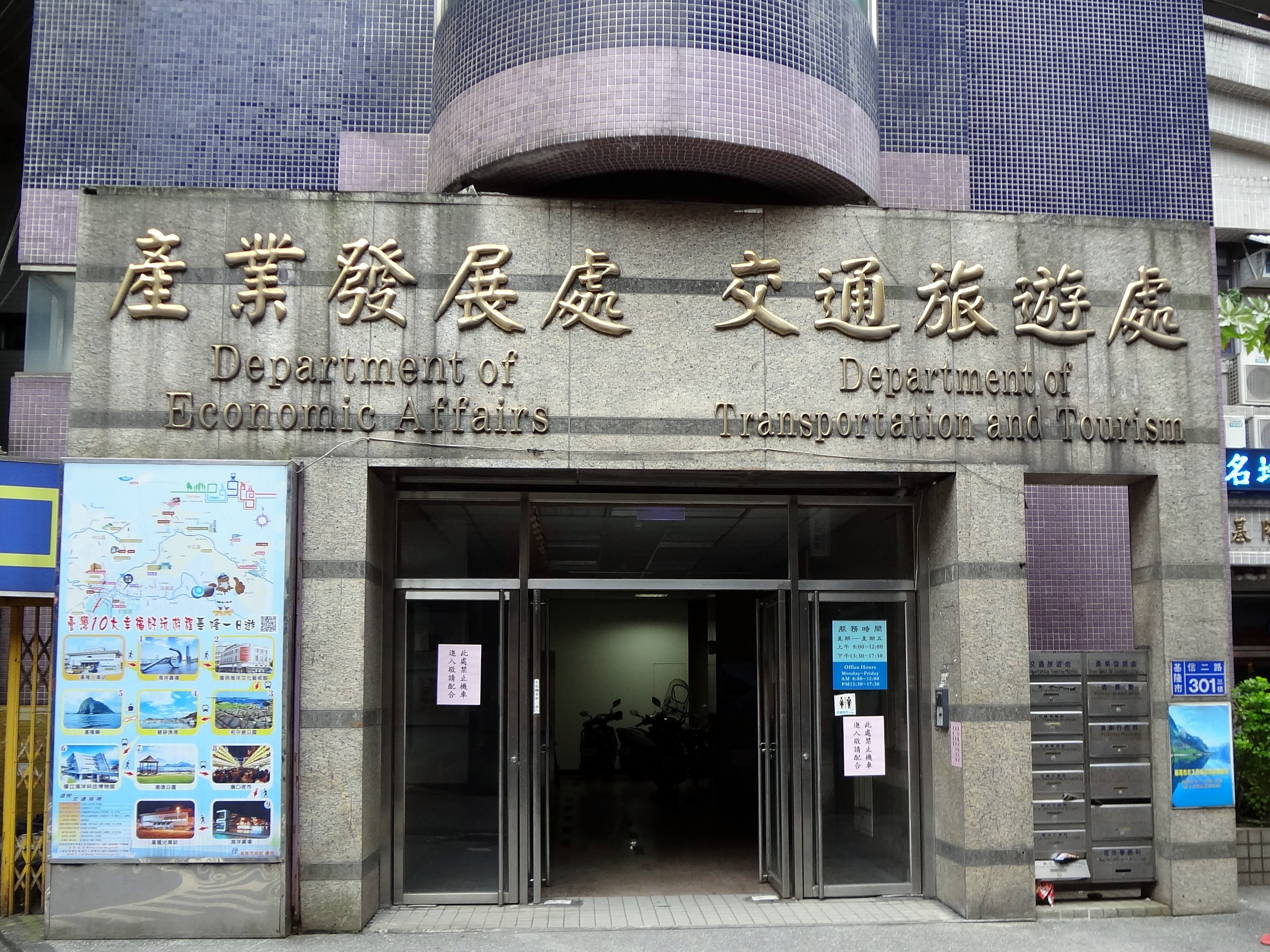
Department of Economic Affairs and Department of Transportation and Tourism

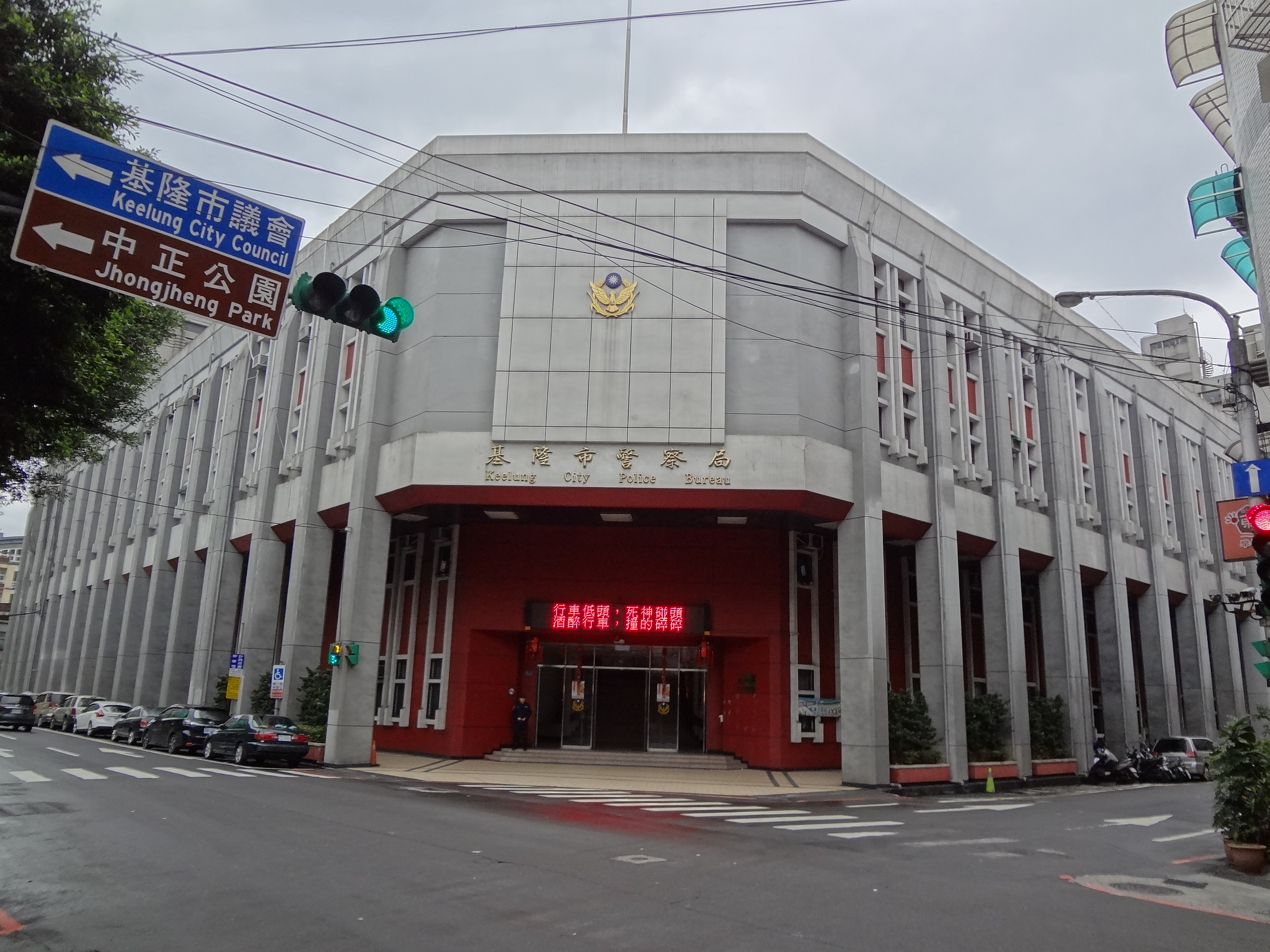
Keelung Police Bureau

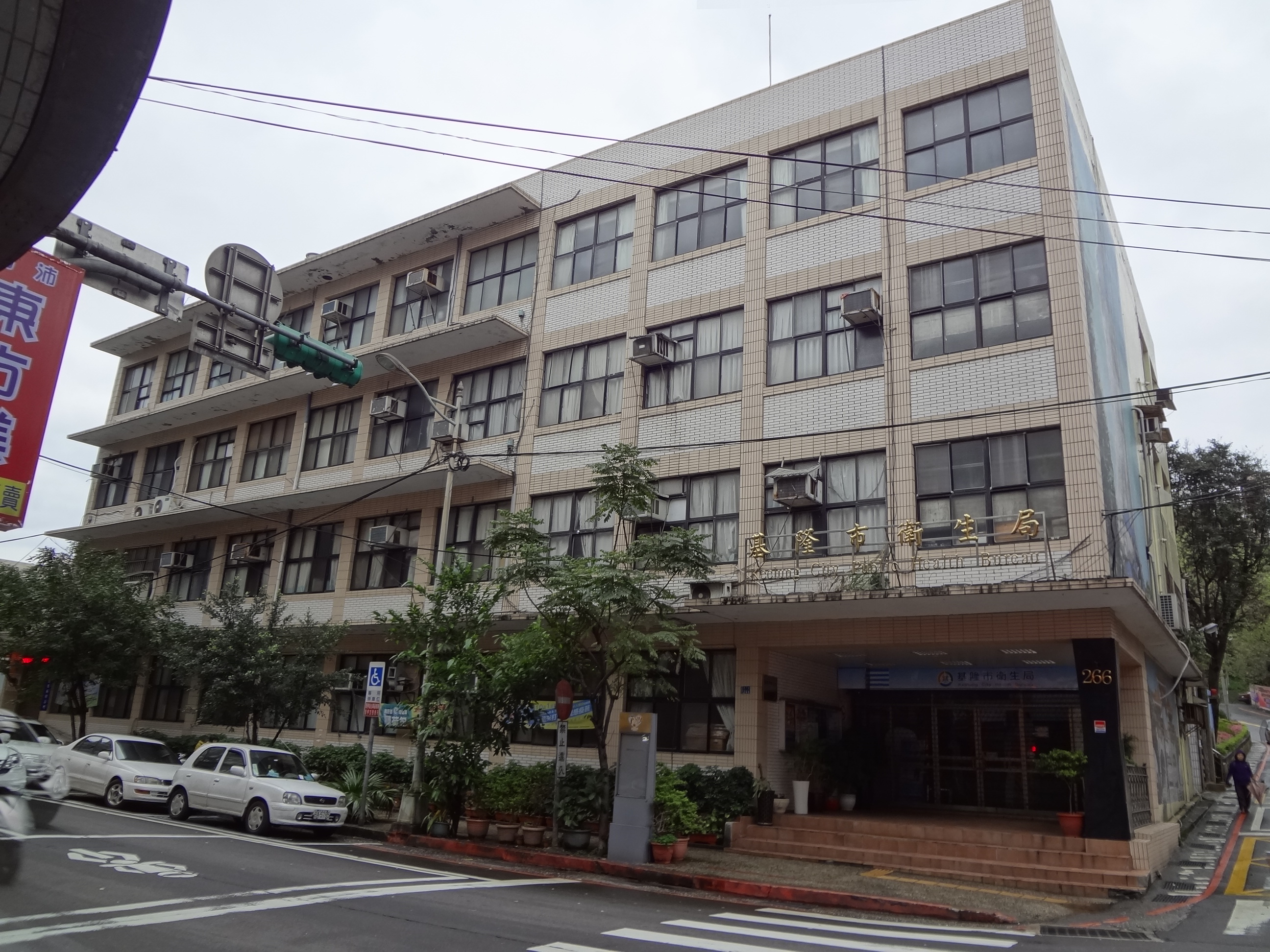
City Health Bureau

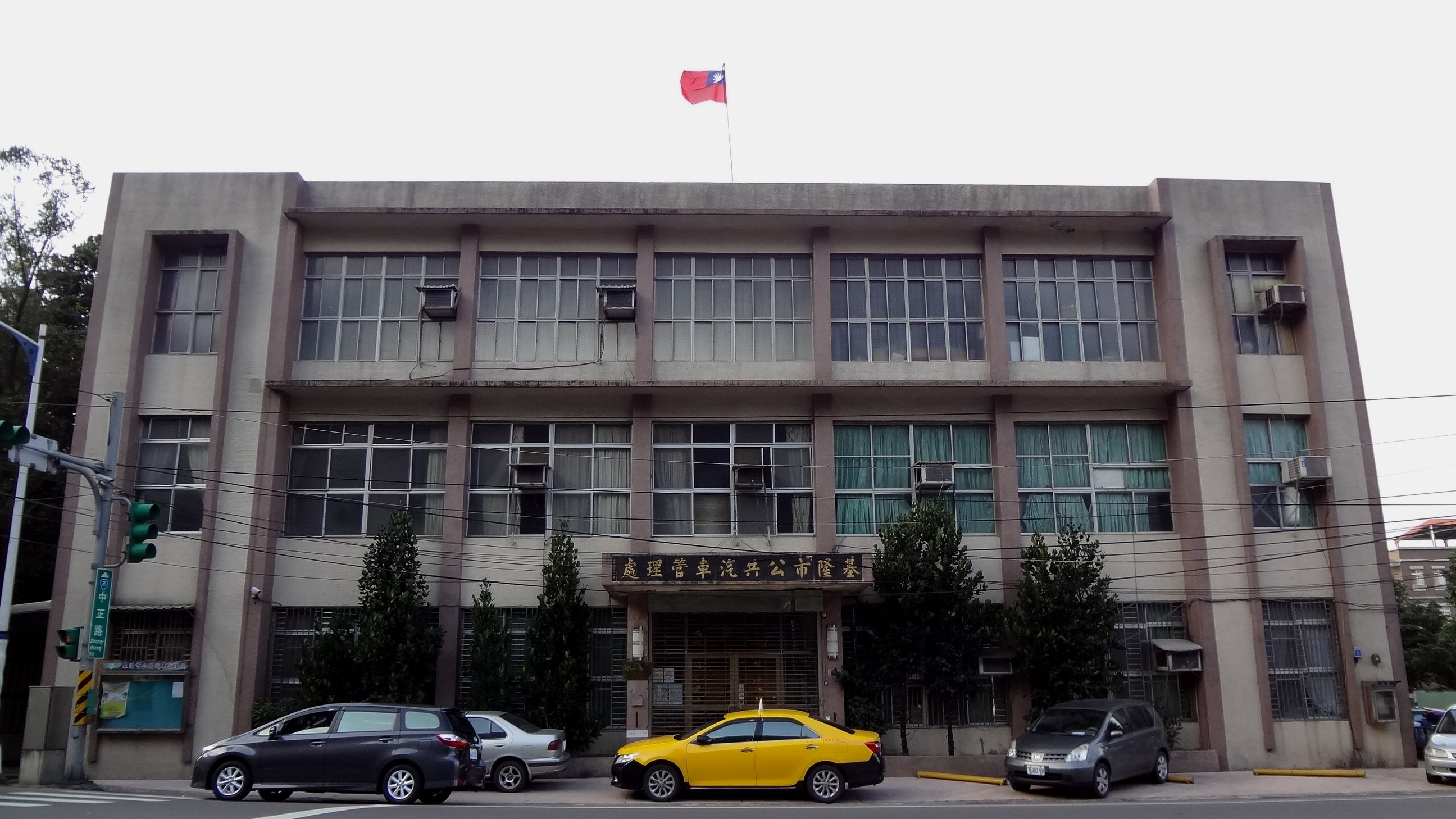
Keelung City Bus Management Office

- Chief Secretary
- Department of Civil Affairs
- Department of Finance
- Department of Economic Affairs
- Department of Education
- Department of Public Works
- Department of Transportation and Tourism
- Department of Urban Development
- Department of Social Affairs
- Department of Land Administration
- Department of General Affairs
- Department of Research and Evaluation
- Department of Personnel
- Department of Civil Service Ethics
- Department of Budget, Accounting and Statistics
- Senior Consumer Ombudsman Officer
- Police Bureau
- Keelung City Fire Department
- Health Bureau
  - Municipal Hospital
  - Public District Health Center
  - Chronic Disease Bureau
- Cultural Affairs Bureau
- Environmental Protection Bureau
- Revenue Service Bureau
- Keelung City Bus Management Office
- District Office
  - Zhongzheng District Office
  - Xinyi District Office
  - Ren'ai District Office
  - Zhongshan District Office
  - Anle District Office
  - Nuannuan District Office
  - Qidu District Office
- Household Registration Office
- Land Office
  - Anle Land Office
  - Xinyi Land Office
- Ren'ai Senior Citizen's Home
- Municipal Stadium
- Mortuary Services Office
- Public Market
- Municipal Nursery
- Junior High School
- Elementary School
- Municipal Kindergarten

== Access ==
Keelung City Hall is accessible within walking distance east from Keelung Station of Taiwan Railway.

== See also ==
- Keelung City Council
