= Keelung City Indigenous Cultural Hall =

Cultural center in Zhongzheng, Keelung, Taiwan

- 基隆市原住民文化會館
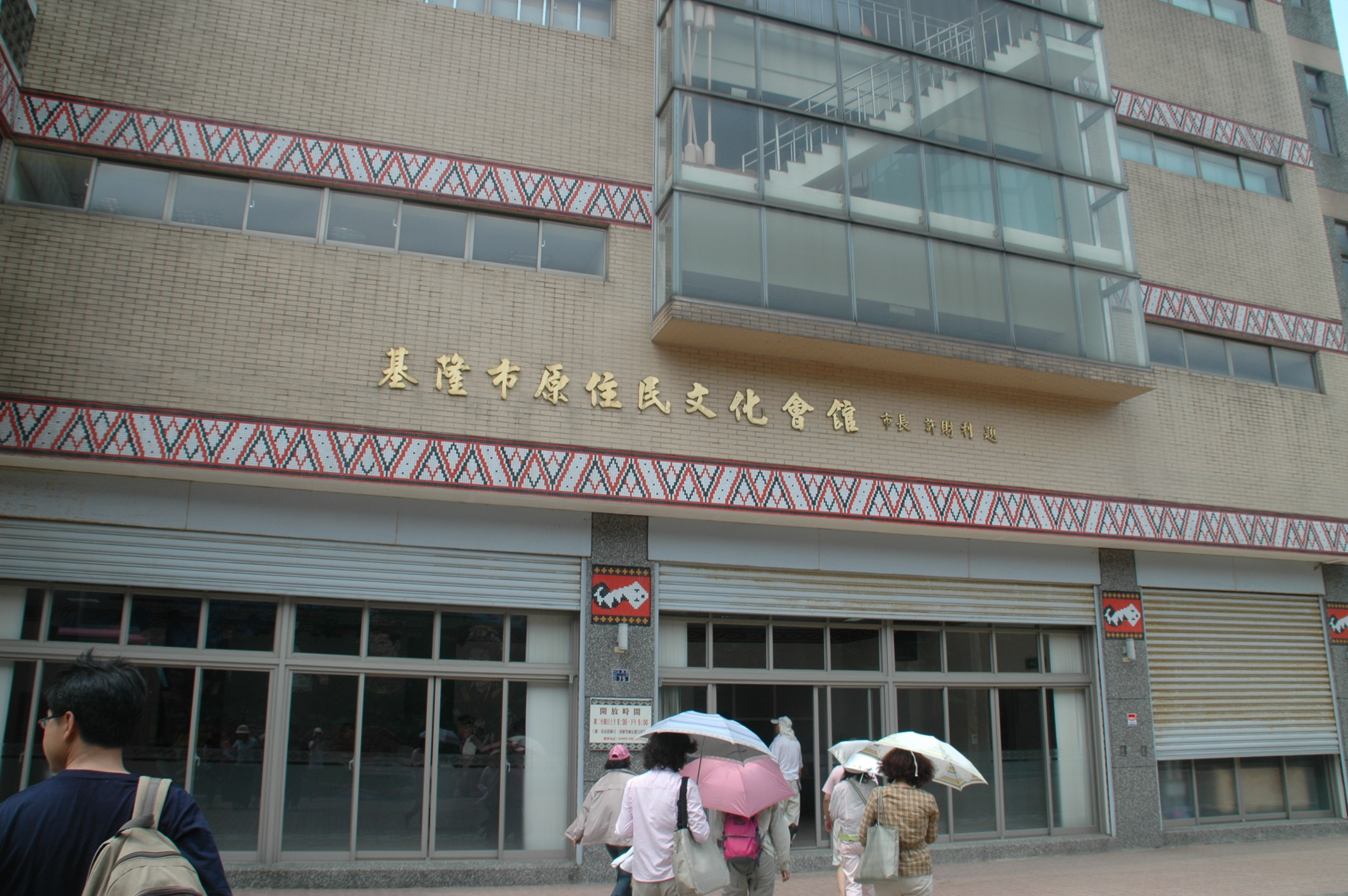
- Interactive map of the Keelung City Indigenous Cultural Hall area

General information
- Type: cultural center
- Location: Zhongzheng, Keelung, Taiwan
- Coordinates: 25°09′13.4″N 121°46′17.3″E

Technical details
- Floor count: 5

The Keelung City Indigenous Cultural Hall (KCICH; traditional Chinese: 基隆市原住民文化會館; simplified Chinese: 基隆市原住民文化会馆; pinyin: Jīlóng Shìyuán Zhùmín Wénhuà Huìguǎn) is a cultural center in Zhongzheng District, Keelung, Taiwan.

== Architecture ==
The cultural center is located in a five-story building. The first floor features various activities, while the third and fourth floors serve as the exhibition hall. The topmost floor connects to the Indigenous Culture Square, which includes sculptures, houses, and a viewing platform.

== See also ==
- List of tourist attractions in Taiwan
