= Mianhua Islet =

Islet north of Taiwan

Native name: 棉花嶼
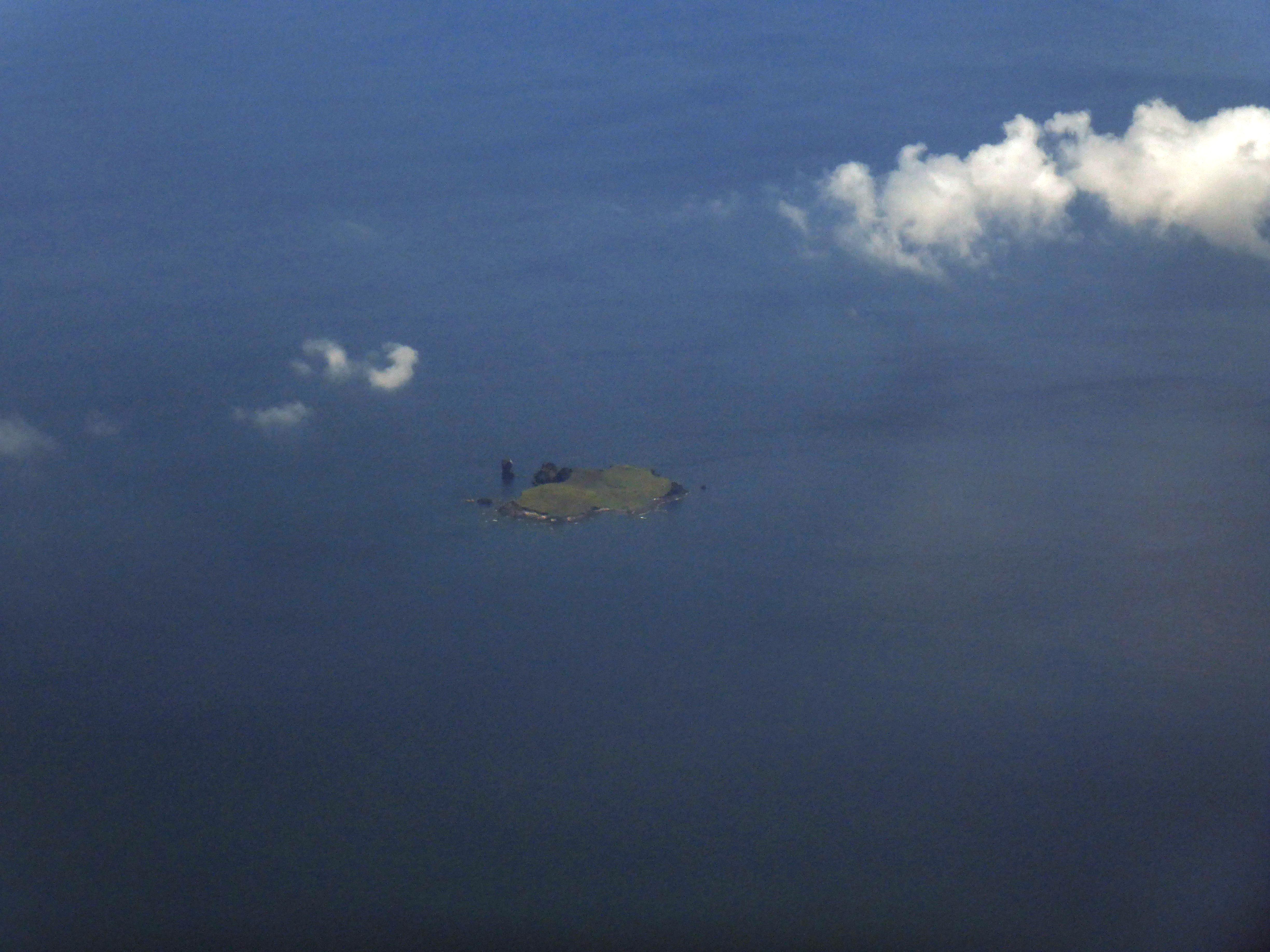
- Mianhua Islet and Pingfong Rock in the East China Sea

- Location in the East China Sea

Geography
- Location: In the East China Sea, north of Taiwan Island in Zhongzheng, Keelung, Taiwan
- Coordinates: 25°29′06″N 122°6′23″E
- Area: 0.133 km^{2} (0.051 sq mi)
- Highest elevation: 61 m (200 ft)

Administration
- Republic of China (Taiwan)
- Province: Taiwan (streamlined)
- Provincial city: Keelung
- District: Zhongzheng

Additional information
- Time zone: National Standard Time (UTC+8)

Location of Mianhua Islet

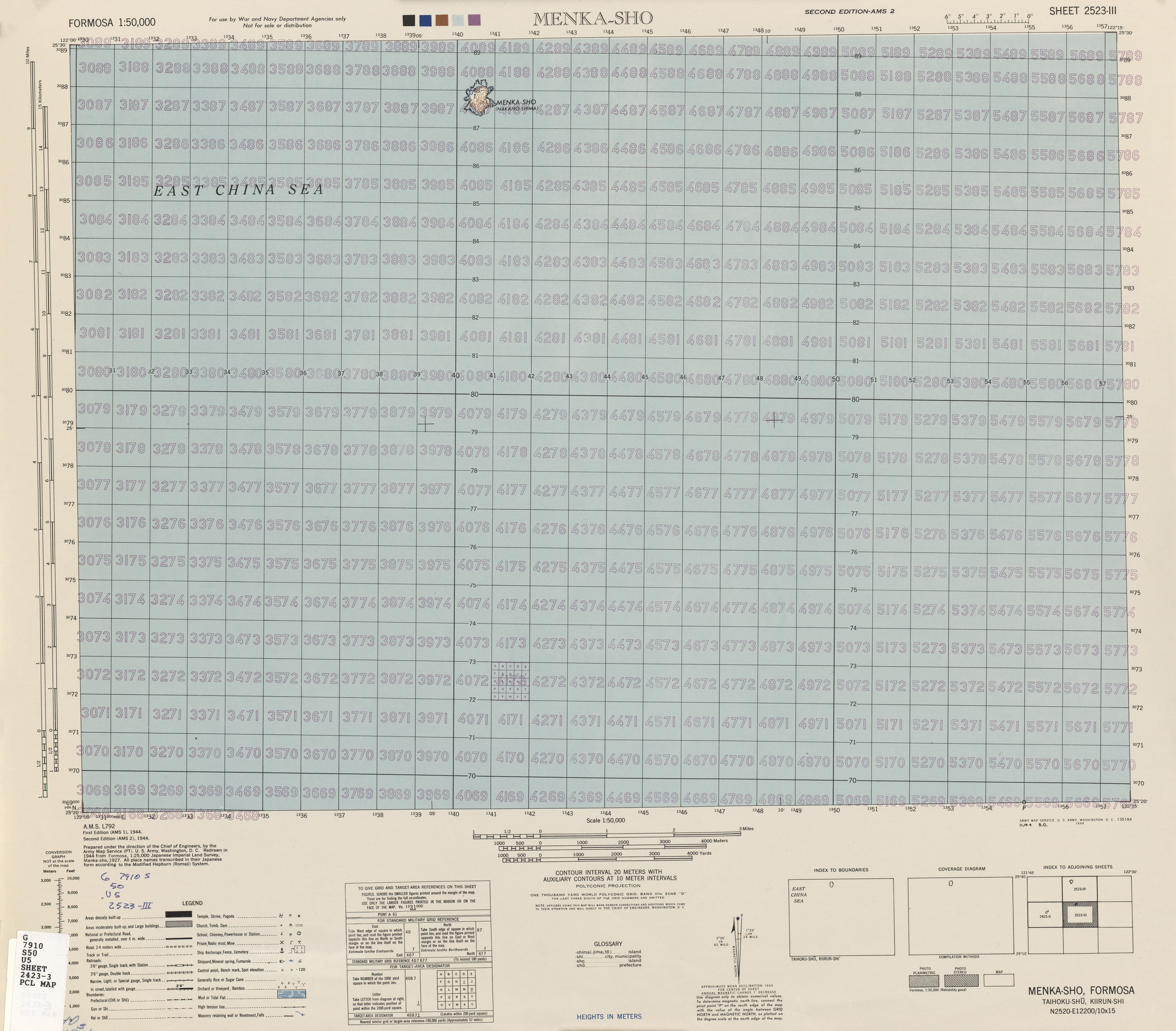
Map of Mianhua Islet (labeled as MENKA-SHO; NAKANO-SHIMA) and surrounding area (AMS, 1944)

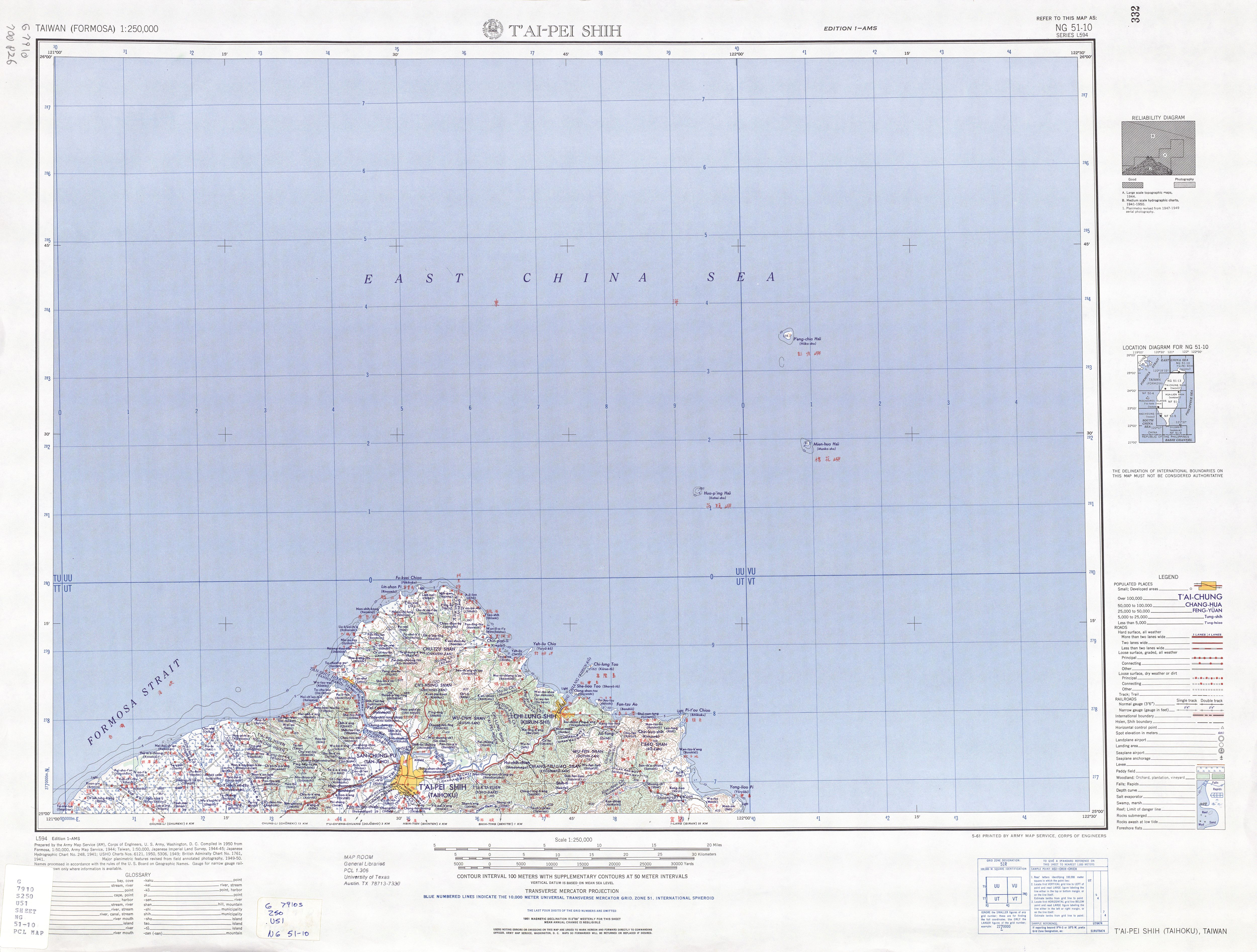
Mianhua Islet (labeled as Mien-hua Hsü (Menka-sho) 棉花嶼) (AMS, 1950)

Mianhua Islet (Chinese: 棉花嶼; pinyin: Miánhuā Yǔ; lit. 'cotton islet') is a 0.133 km^{2} (0.051 mi^{2}) volcanic island in Zhongzheng District, Keelung, Taiwan, located in the East China Sea. Pingfong Rock, just east of the islet, is the easternmost point under the actual control of Taiwan (ROC).

== Name ==
Mianhua Islet (Chinese: 棉花嶼; pinyin: Miánhuā Yǔ; lit. 'cotton islet') is also known as Kangjiao Islet, Jhongdao (Midway Islet), Mien-hua Hsü, Menka-sho, Mienhua Yü, and Craig Island.

== History ==
In his 1868 book Rambles of a Naturalist on the Shores and Waters of the China Sea, Cuthbert Collingwood (naturalist) described Mianhua Islet, its birds and insects, its geology and two people on the island who were collecting bird eggs.

In his 1895 book From Far Formosa, George Leslie Mackay briefly described Mianhua Islet:

Craig is also unfit for man's abode, but was surely heaved up to be the home of the seafaring birds that gather there in flocks that at times literally darken the sky. On one side the island is a rugged and perpendicular wall of rock two hundred feet high. From that side it slopes down to the water's edge, forming a surface of two or three acres, which is smooth, without trees or shrubs, but completely covered with soft grass, in which the birds lay their eggs without making any kind of nest. I discovered twelve different kinds of grasses, but no flowers. Insects, including the dreaded centipede and several species of beetle, abounded. But the characteristic of this island is its bird-life. Gulls and terns gather there in millions. As they return homeward they hover over the island for a little, and then settle down like a wide-spreading mantle of wings. The whole sloping surface is covered, and the sight is worth the voyage to see.

Mackay also described the collection of birds and bird eggs by people from Pengjia Islet.

In 1994, plans for a scenic area including Mianhua Islet were proposed. These plans met with opposition from conservation groups who argued that the natural environment of the islet would be damaged by the creation of a scenic area. From May to September, seven scientific expeditions documenting the birds, geology, plants, insects, amphibians and reptiles of the islet were carried out, and an application to the Environmental Protection Administration to preserve Mianhua Islet and Huaping Islet as a Level One Ecologically Sensitive Area and Pengjia Islet as a Level Two Ecologically Sensitive Area was made.

On March 18, 1996, the Mianhua Islet and Huaping Islet Wildlife Preservation Area (棉花嶼、花瓶嶼野生動物保護區) was established.

In August 1996, the existing population of sheep on the islet was relocated to Taiwan to help restore the natural environment of the islet.

== Geography ==
The islet is about 800 m (2,600 ft) long from north to south and 530 m (1,740 ft) wide from east to west, with an elevation of 61 m (200 ft). The 25 m (82 ft) tall rock reef to the east of the islet is called Pingfong Rock (screen rock; 屏風岩). Along with the nearby Pengjia Islet and Huaping Islet, Mianhua Islet is considered of strategic importance to Taiwan.

== See also ==
- List of islands in the East China Sea
- List of islands of Taiwan
- List of Taiwanese superlatives
