= Huaping =

Huaping (Hua-pʻing) may refer to -

- Huaping County, Lijiang, Yunnan, China
- Huaping Islet, Zhongzheng, Keelung, Taiwan
