= Ruifang railway station =

Railway station in New Taipei, Taiwan

Ruifang 瑞芳
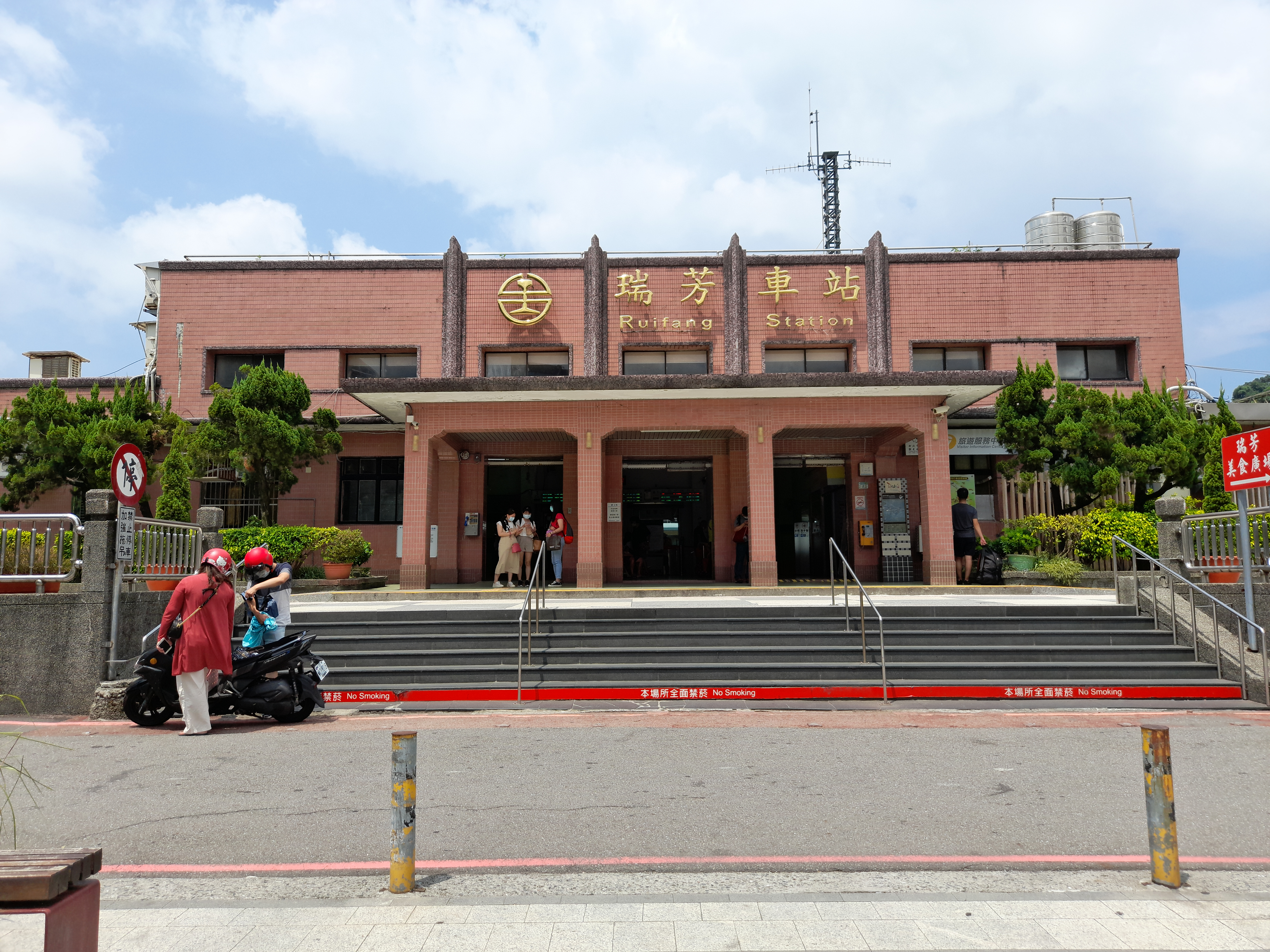

Chinese name
- Traditional Chinese: 瑞芳
Transcriptions
Standard Mandarin
- Hanyu Pinyin: Ruìfāng
- Bopomofo: ㄖㄨㄟˋ ㄈㄤ

General information
- Location: 82 Sec 3 Mingdeng Rd, Ruifang, New Taipei, Taiwan
- Coordinates: 25.1087°N 121.8060°E
- System: TRA railway station
- Lines: Shen'ao line; Eastern Trunk line
- Distance: 8.9 km to Badu
- Connections: Local bus; Coach

Construction
- Structure type: Ground level

Other information
- Station code: E03 (statistical)
- Classification: First class (Chinese: 一等)
- Website: www.railway.gov.tw/rueifang/ (in Chinese)

History
- Opened: 5 May 1919
- Electrified: 3 May 2000

Key dates
- 1989: Shen'ao line passenger services closed
- 2014-01: Shen'ao line re-opened

Passengers
- 2017: 4.786 million per year ▲1.85%
- Rank: 26 out of 228

Services
Preceding station	Taiwan Railway	Following station
Terminus	Shen'ao line	Haikeguan towards Badouzi
Sijiaoting towards Badu	Eastern Trunk line	Houtong towards Taitung
Location
- Location within Taiwan

Ruifang (Chinese: 瑞芳; pinyin: Ruìfāng) is a railway station in New Taipei, Taiwan served by Taiwan Railway.

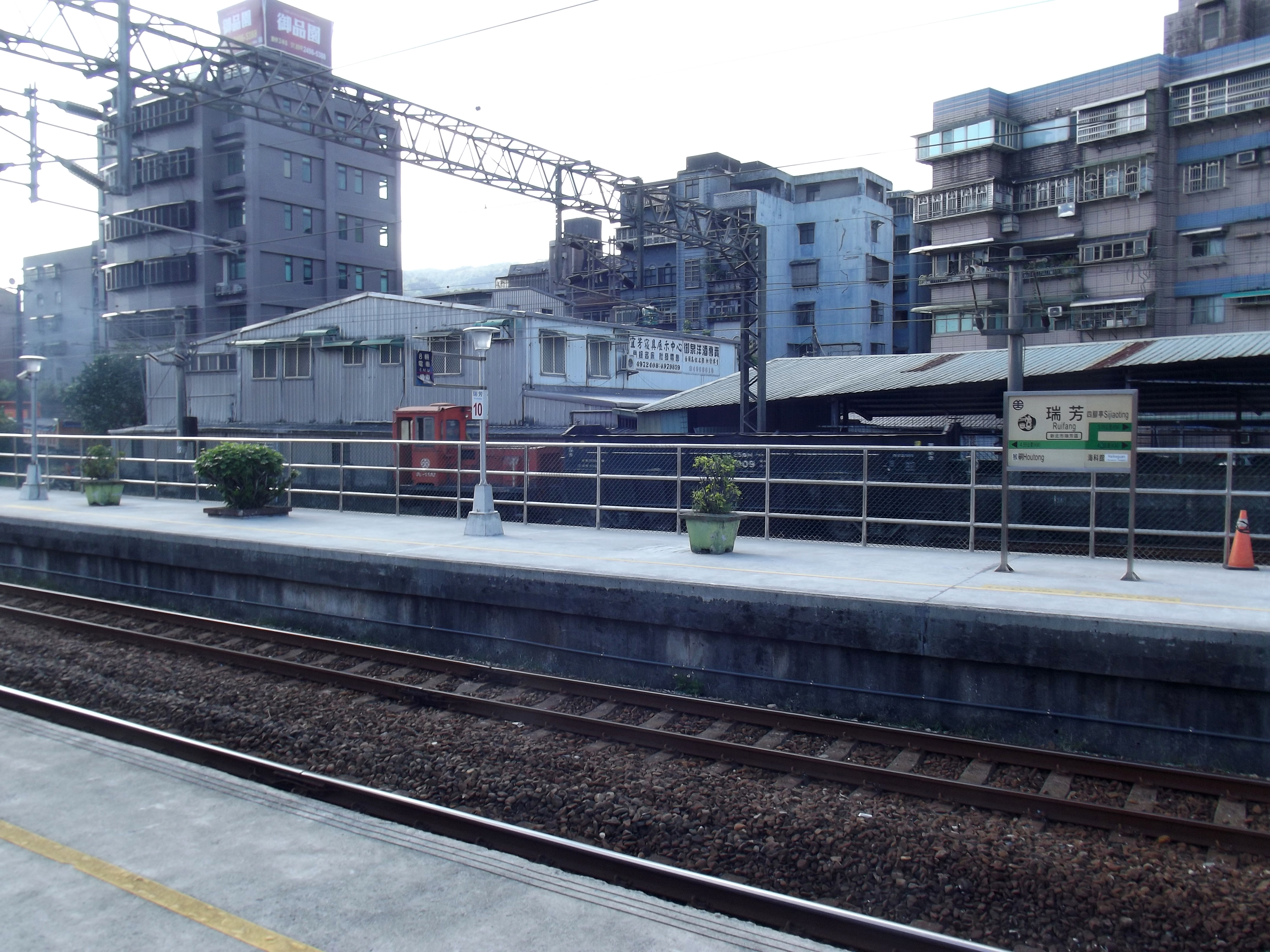
Rueifang station platform

== History ==
The station was opened on 5 May 1919.

== Structure ==
There are two island platforms and one side platform.

== See also ==
- List of railway stations in Taiwan
