= Zhongzheng District, Keelung =

District of Keelung, Taiwan

Coordinates: 25.147849°N 121.772018°E

Zhongzheng 中正區 Jhongjheng
- District
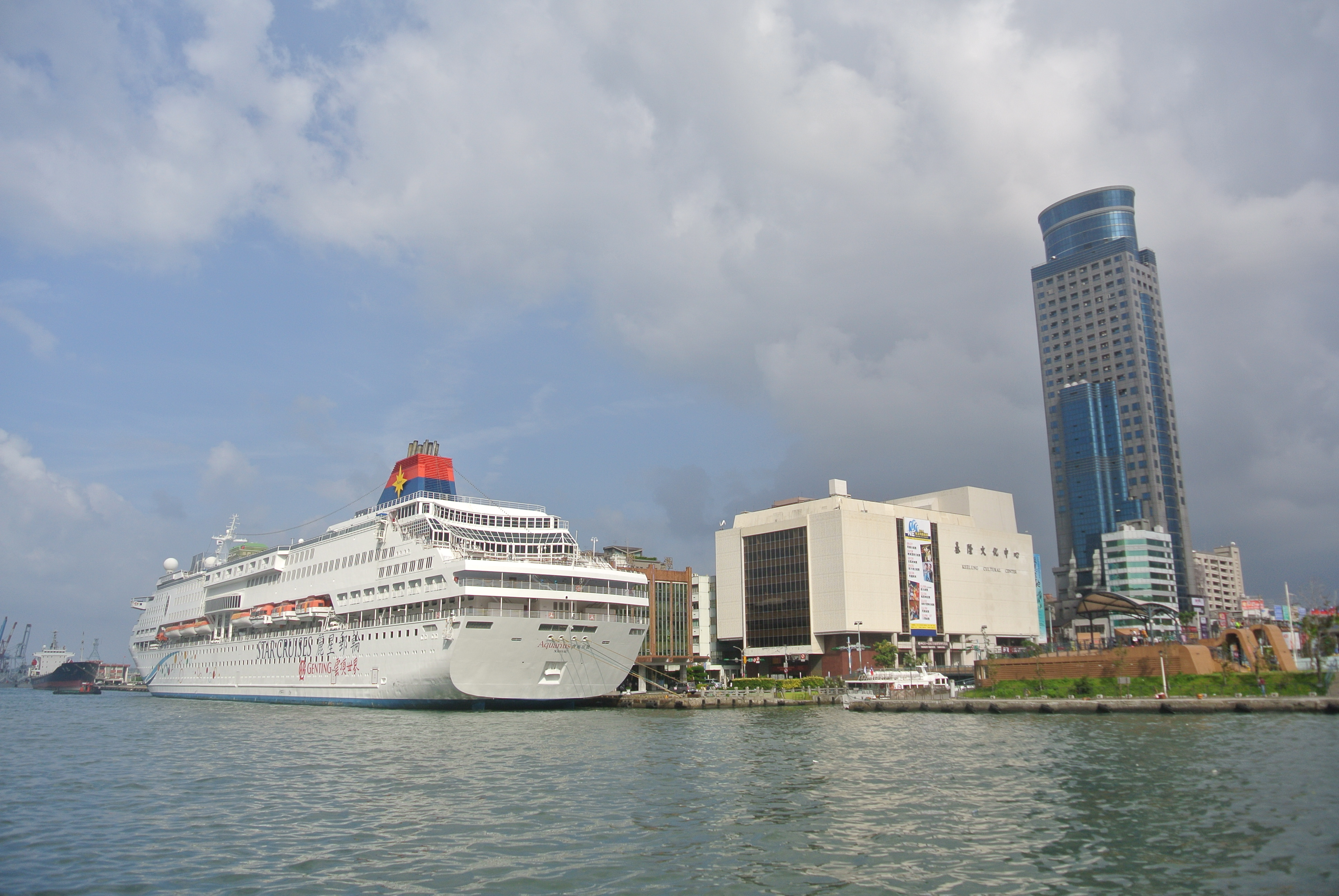
- View of the Port of Keelung from Zhongzheng District

- Zhongzheng District in Keelung City
- Location: Keelung, Taiwan
- Urban villages: 26

Government
  - Mayor: Li Chi-Ching (李吉清)

Area
  - Total: 10.2118 km^{2} (3.9428 sq mi)

Population (October 2023)
  - Total: 50,693
  - Density: 4,964.2/km^{2} (12,857/sq mi)
- Time zone: UTC+8 (National Standard Time)
- Postal code: 202
- Website: www.klzz.klcg.gov.tw (in Chinese)

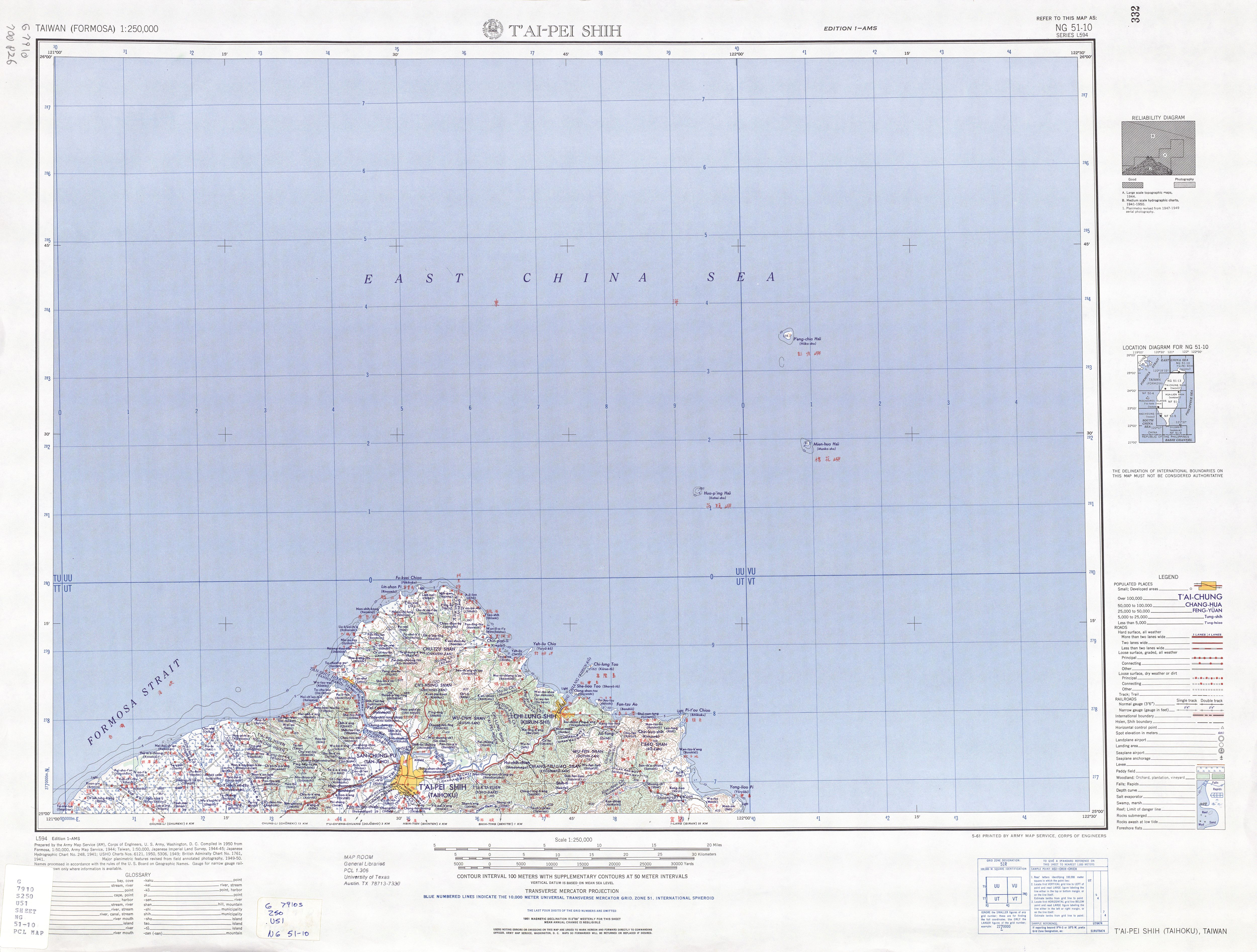
Area of today's Zhongzheng District, Keelung (1950)

Zhongzheng District or Jhongjheng District (Chinese: 中正區; Hanyu Pinyin: Zhōngzhèng Qū; Tongyong Pinyin: Jhongjhèng Cyu; Pe̍h-ōe-jī: Tiong-chèng-khu) is a district of Keelung City, Taiwan. The district is the city seat of Keelung City.

== Geography ==
Zhongzheng District encompasses Hoping Island (和平島) and the nearby Keelung Islet, as well as the more distant Pengjia Islet, Mianhua Islet and Huaping Islet. Pingfong Rock (屏風岩), just east of Mianhua Islet, is the easternmost point under the actual control of Taiwan (ROC).

== Administrative divisions ==
Zhongzheng District is made up of twenty-six urban villages:

- Deyi (德義里), Zhengyi/Jhengyi (正義里), Xinyi/Sinyi (信義里), Yizhong/Yijhong (義重里), Gangtong (港通里), Zhongchuan/Jhongchuan (中船里), Zhengchuan/Jhengchuan (正船里), Ruchuan (入船里), Zhongsha/Jhongsha (中砂里), Zhengsha/Jhengsha (正砂里), Zhensha/Jhensha (真砂里), Shawan (砂灣里), Jianguo (建國里), Zhongbin/Jhongbin (中濱里), Seashore (Haibin) (海濱里), Sheliao (社寮里), Hexian/Hesian (和憲里), Pingliao (平寮里), Badou (八斗里), Bisha (碧砂里), Changtan/Zhangtan (長潭里), Shazi/Shazih (砂子里), Zhongzheng/Jhongjheng (中正里), Zhengbin/Jhengbin (正濱里), Xinfeng/Sinfong (新豐里), Xinfu/Sinfu Village (新富)

== Government institutions ==
- Keelung City Government
- Keelung City Council

== Education ==
- National Taiwan Ocean University

== Tourist attractions ==
- Badouzi Fishing Port
- Bisha Fishing Port
- Chung Cheng Park
- Ershawan Battery
- Heping Island Park
- Keelung City Indigenous Cultural Hall
- Keelung Cultural Center
- Keelung Fort Commander's Official Residence
- National Museum of Marine Science and Technology
- Pengjia Lighthouse
- Chaur Jing park
- Erhsha Bay Battery
- Padouzi Seashore Park
- Peace Island Park

== Transportation ==
- TR Shen'ao line
  - Haikeguan Station
  - Badouzi Station

== Notable natives ==
- Chang Tong-rong, Mayor of Keelung City (2007–2014)
- Wang Tuoh, Minister of Council for Cultural Affairs (2008)

== See also ==
- List of Taiwanese superlatives
