= Huaping Islet =

Islet north of Taiwan

Disputed island Native name: 花瓶嶼 (Mandarin), 花矸嶼 (Hokkien)
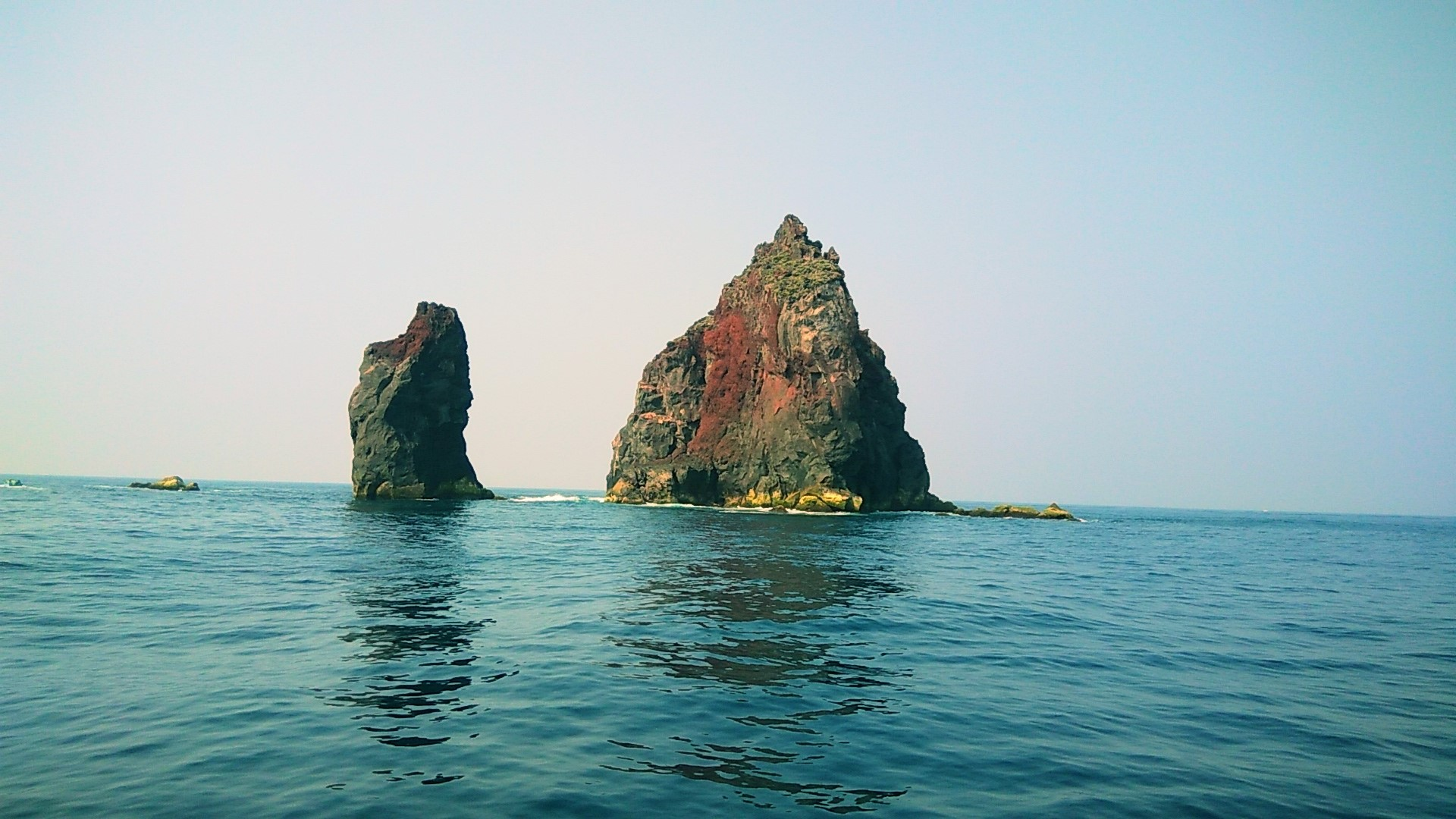
- Huaping Islet from the north

- Location in the East China Sea

Geography
- Location: In the East China Sea north of Taiwan Island, part of Zhongzheng, Keelung, Taiwan
- Coordinates: 25°25′39″N 121°56′27″E
- Area: 0.0308 km^{2} (0.0119 sq mi)
- Highest elevation: 51 m (167 ft)

Administration
- Republic of China (Taiwan)
- Province: Taiwan (streamlined)
- Provincial city: Keelung
- District: Zhongzheng

Additional information
- Time zone: National Standard Time (UTC+8)

Location of Huaping Islet

Huaping Islet (Chinese: 花瓶嶼; pinyin: Huāpíng Yǔ), Taiwanese Hokkien: (Chinese: 花矸嶼; Pe̍h-ōe-jī: Hoe-kan-sū) is an 0.0308 km^{2} (0.0119 mi^{2}) volcanic island in Zhongzheng District, Keelung, Taiwan located in the East China Sea. The islet is 180 m (590 ft) long and 80 m (260 ft) wide with an elevation of 51 m (167 ft). Pyroxene and andesite are the major rock types of the islet. The entire islet is covered with metallic volcanic debris which has turned purplish red (bordeaux), purple, green, brass (yellowish) and iron grey after oxidation.' Along with the nearby Pengjia Islet and Mianhua Islet, Huaping Islet is considered of strategic importance to Taiwan.

== Name ==
Huaping Islet (Chinese: 花瓶嶼; pinyin: Huāpíng Yǔ), Taiwanese Hokkien: (Chinese: 花矸嶼; Pe̍h-ōe-jī: Hoe-kan-sū) is also known as Kangjiao Yu ('sedan islet'), Hua-pʻing Hsü, Kahei-sho, Huaping Yü, and Pinnacle Island.

== History ==
In his 1868 book Rambles of a Naturalist on the Shores and Waters of the China Sea, Cuthbert Collingwood (naturalist) briefly described Huaping Islet, called Pinnacle Island or Chair-bearers:

Immediately north of Ke-lung we met with a group of three islands-Pinnacle, Craig, and Agincourt-little, if ever, visited, and of which no description has been given. The first of these, Pinnacle Island, is of a remarkable form and has received the native name of the Chair-bearers, from the fact of the outline faintly resembling a Chinese sedan borne between two men. It is a perfectly bare craggy rock, with a tall pinnacle at either end, against which the waves dash furiously, sending the spray a hundred feet high. The rock was whitened with the exrements of sea-birds, and I had no opportunity of a close inspection.

In his 1895 book From Far Formosa, George Leslie Mackay briefly described Huaping Islet (literally, 'flower pot islet'), also known as Pinnacle Island:

Away to the northeast of Formosa, more than a hundred miles from Kelung, are three islands, called Pinnacle, Craig, and Agincourt. The Chinese names, Flower-pot, Bird, and Large, are descriptive and singularly appropriate. These islands belong to Formosa, but are self-governing and practically independent.
Pinnacle Island is an irregular bare rock, upon which nothing grows and where no land animal could live. It stands one hundred and seventy feet out of the water, and serves only as a resting-place for sea-birds wearied with their long flight.

On March 18, 1996, the Mianhua Islet and Huaping Islet Wildlife Preservation Area (棉花嶼、花瓶嶼野生動物保護區) was established.

Due to the effects of Typhoon Maria (2018), part of the middle of the island crumbled off. The earlier single-humped camel shape became more like the shape of a double-humped camel.

On October 28, 2019, the ship Hsieh-chien 168 (協建168) was sunk after striking rocks in the waters near Huaping Islet.

== Gallery ==
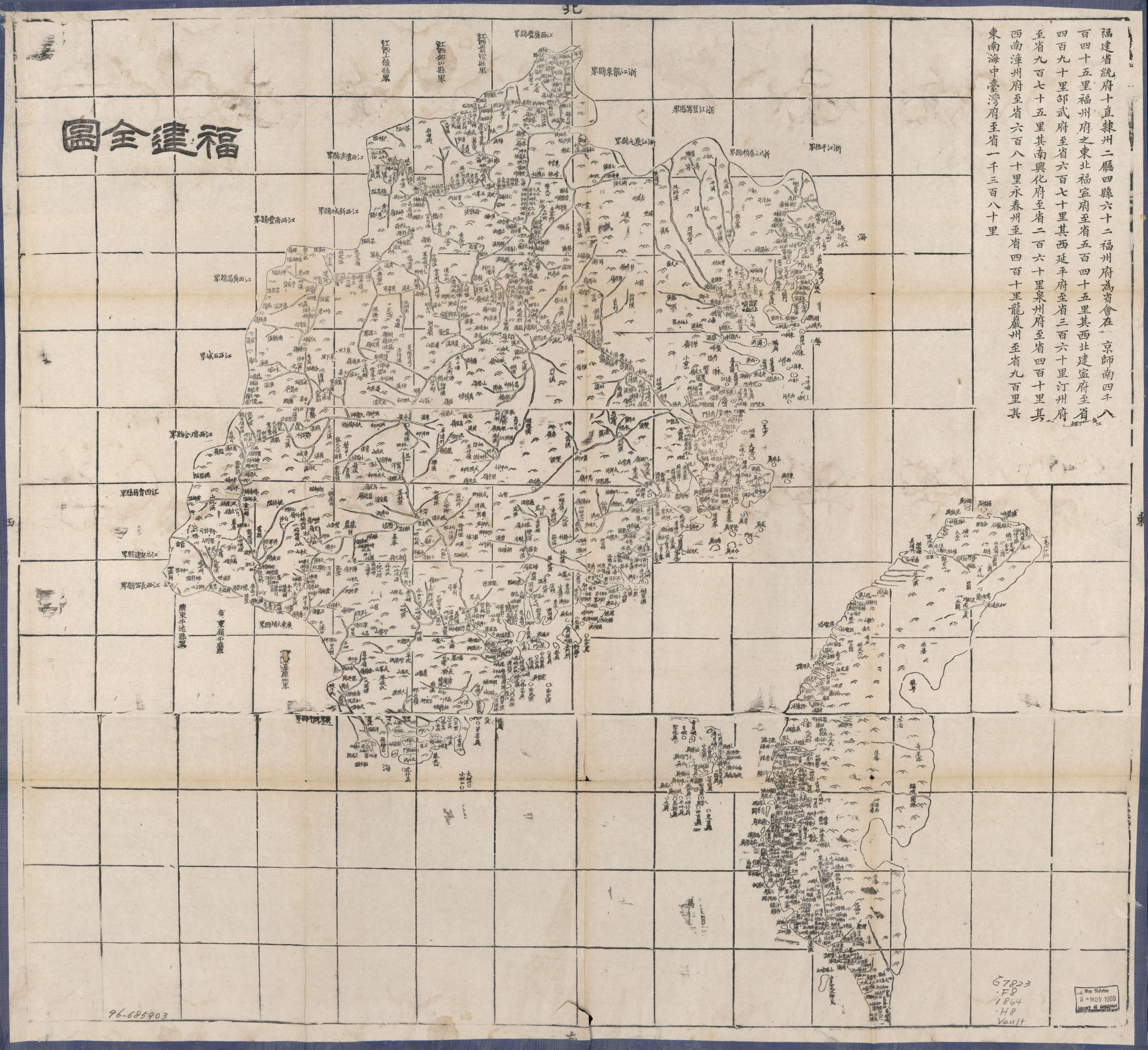
Map including Huaping Islet (labeled as 花瓶㠘)

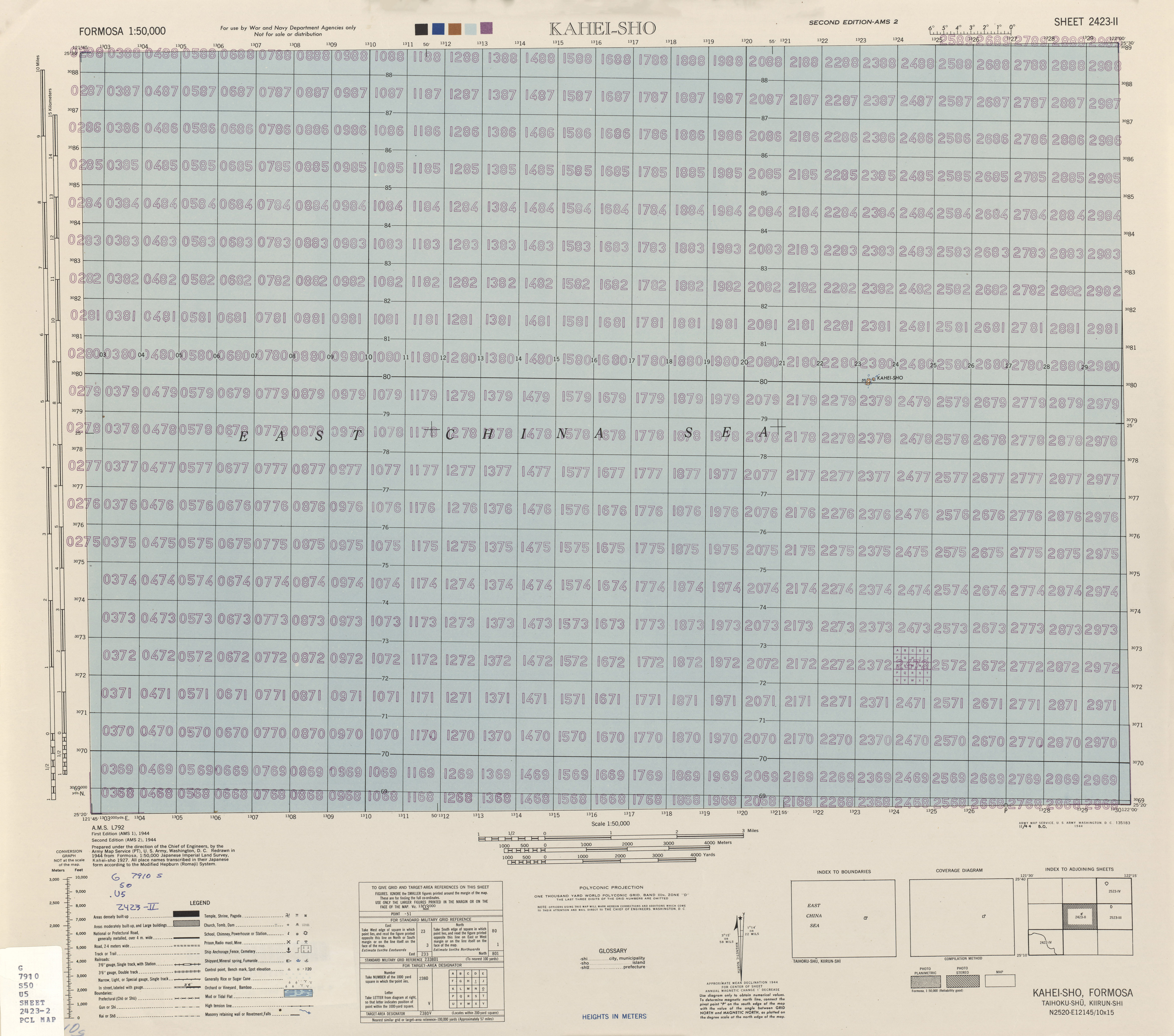
Map of Huaping Islet (labeled as KAHEI-SHO) and surrounding area (AMS, 1944)

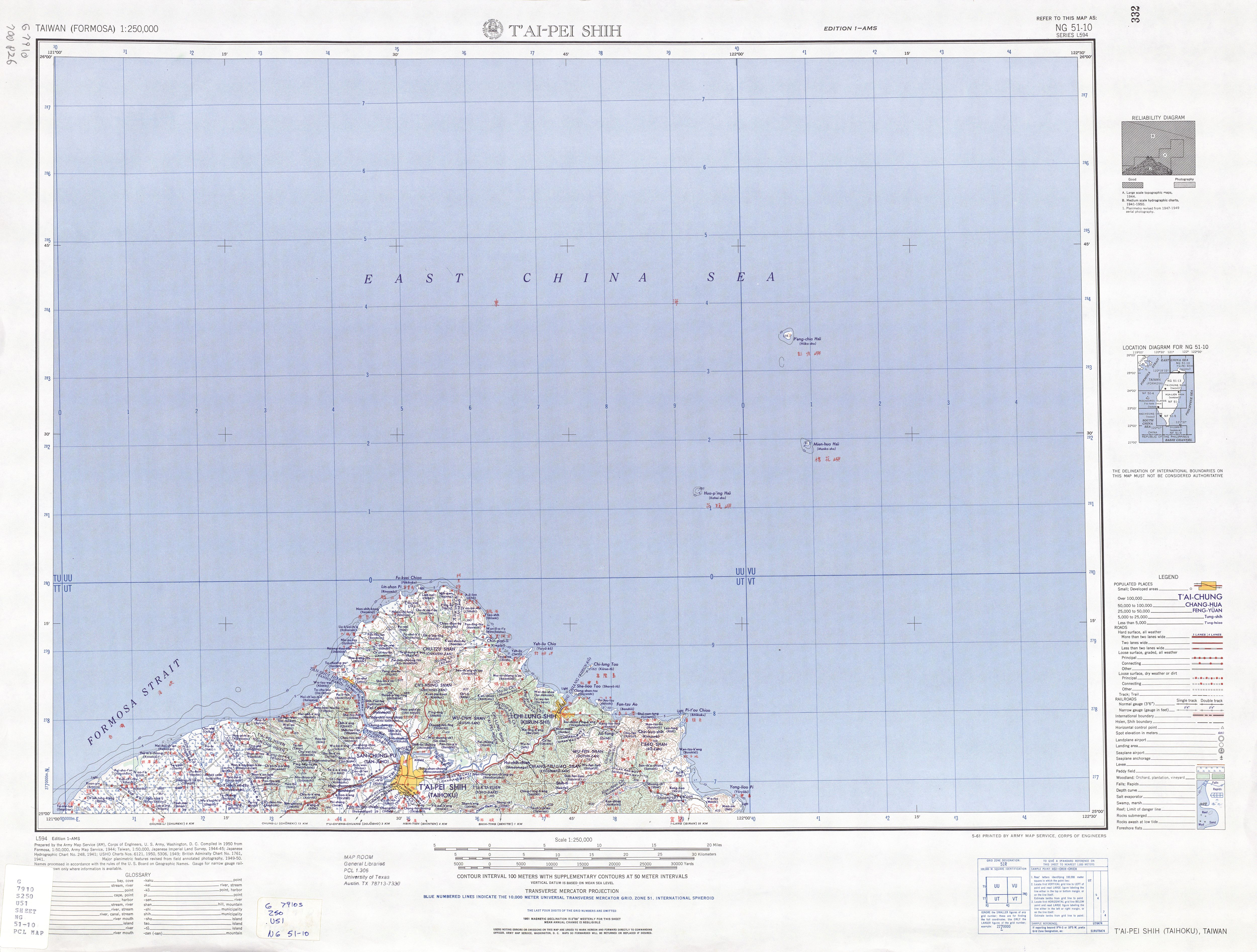
Map including Huaping Islet (labeled as Hua-pʻing Hsü (Kahei-sho) 花瓶嶼) (AMS, 1950)

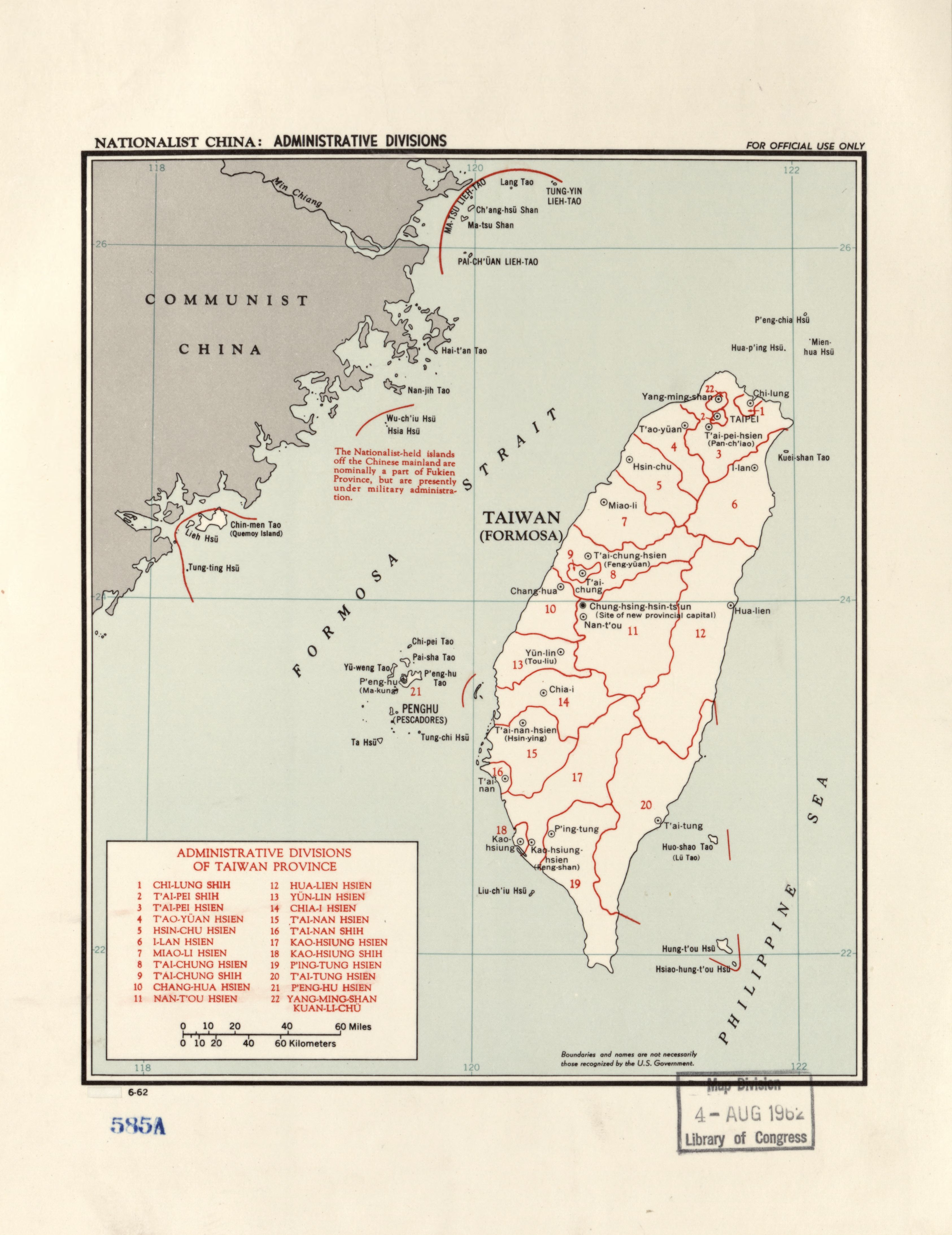
Map including Huaping Islet (labeled as Hua-pʻing Hsü) (1962)

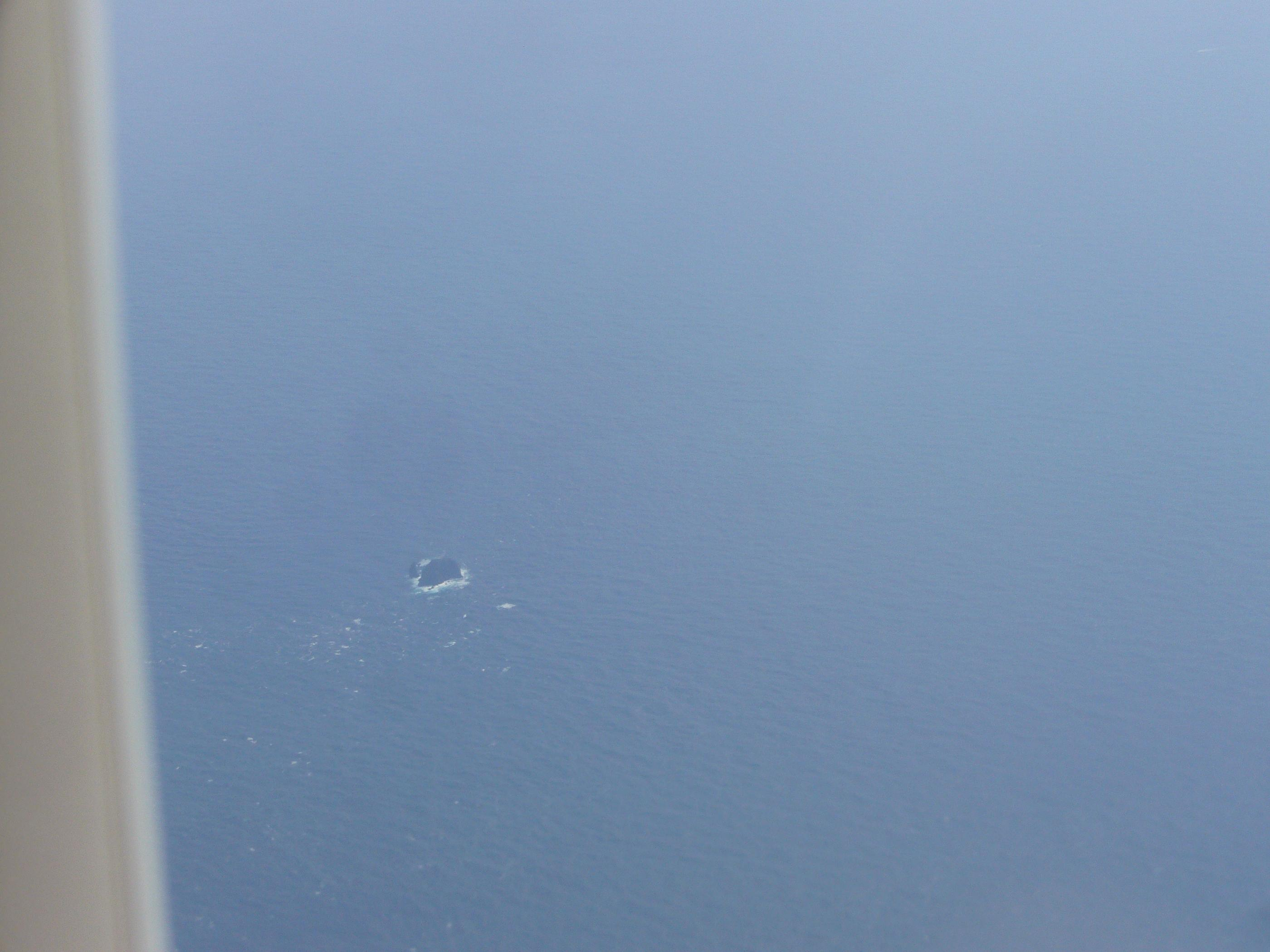
Huaping Islet from above to the northwest

== See also ==
- List of islands of Taiwan
- List of islands in the East China Sea
