= National Museum of Marine Science and Technology =

Museum in Zhongzheng, Keelung, Taiwan

- 國立海洋科技博物館

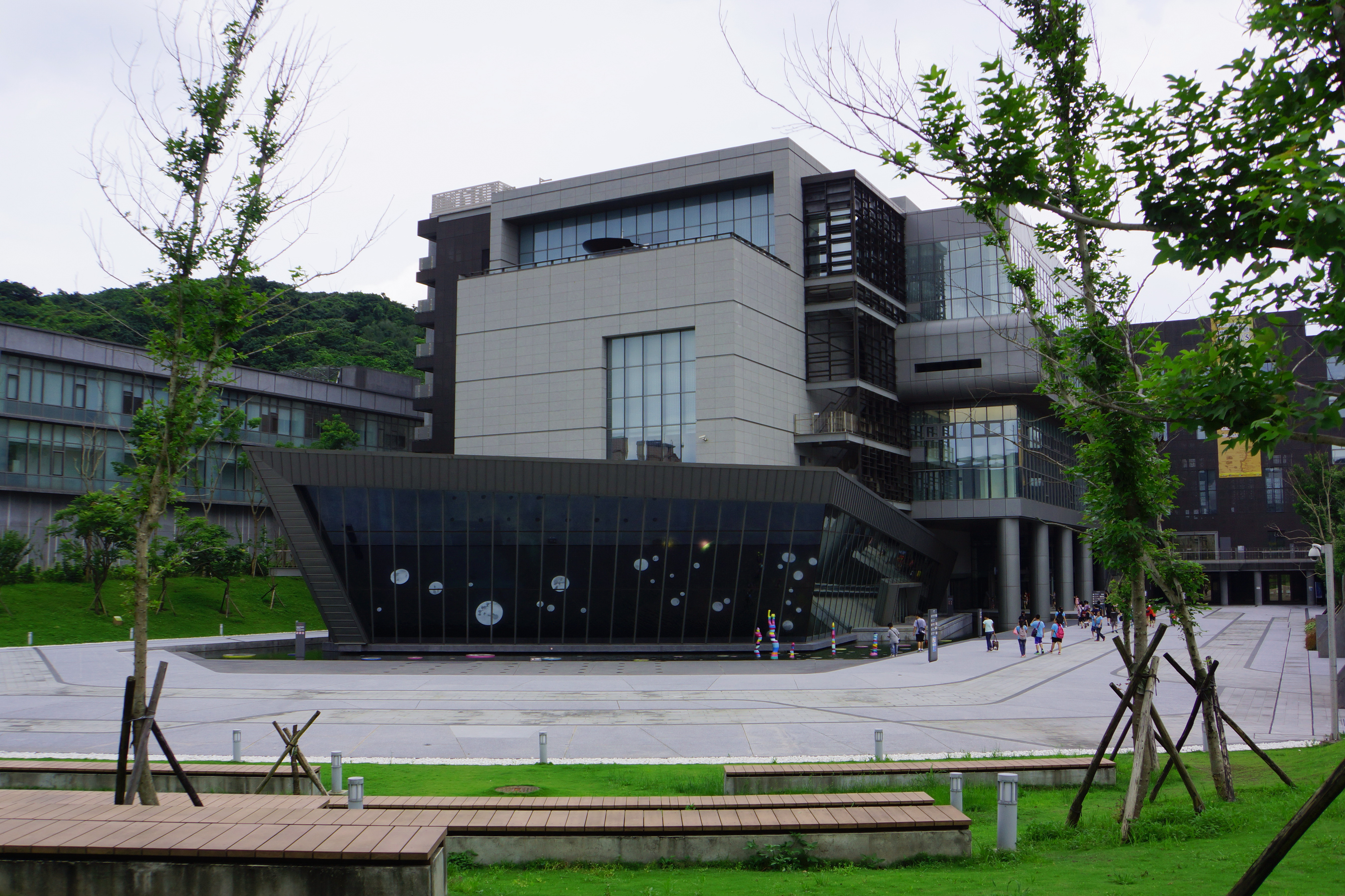
- Established: 26 January 2014
- Location: Zhongzheng, Keelung, Taiwan
- Coordinates: 25°08′26″N 121°47′55″E
- Type: museum
- Public transit access: Haikeguan Station
- Website: Official website

The National Museum of Marine Science and Technology (NMMST; traditional Chinese: 國立海洋科技博物館; simplified Chinese: 国立海洋科技博物馆; pinyin: Guólì Hǎiyáng Kējì Bówùguǎn) is a museum of marine science and marine technology in Zhongzheng District, Keelung, Taiwan. It received 1,395,127 visits in 2016.

== History ==
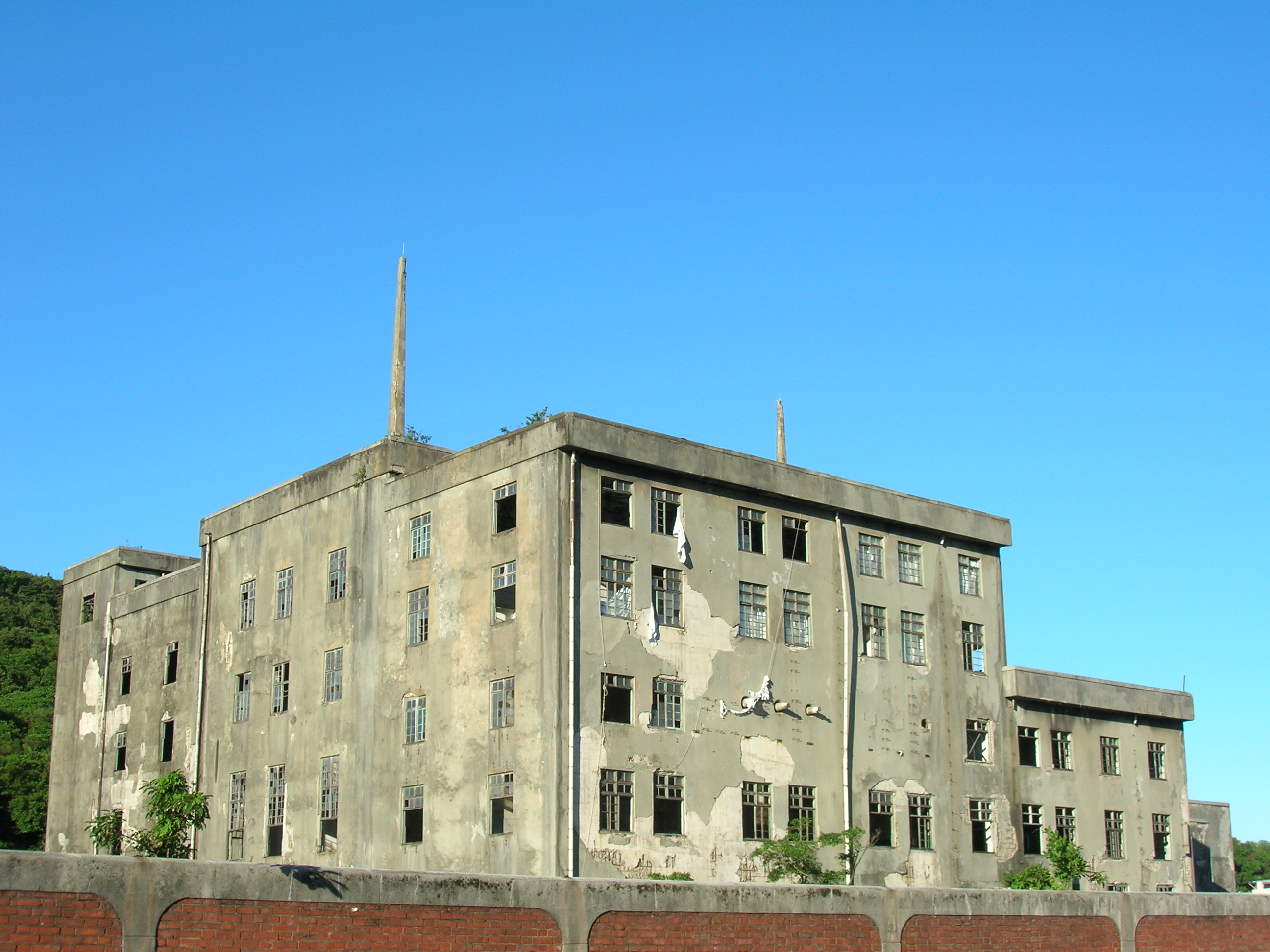
The museum was converted from the former North Thermal Power Plant

The museum building was originally constructed as the North Thermal Power Plant in 1937 by the Japanese government, the first power plant in Taiwan constructed on a reclaimed land. The power plant was decommissioned in 1981 and left abandoned. In 1990, the planning committee to establish the museum was set up, in which in 1997 the preparatory office was subsequently established as well. In 1999, the Executive Yuan approved the construction plan for the museum. In 2001, the plan to convert the former power plant into a museum was unveiled. The building was designated as a historical building in 2004 by Keelung City Government. The museum was opened by Premier Jiang Yi-huah on 26 January 2014.

== Buildings ==
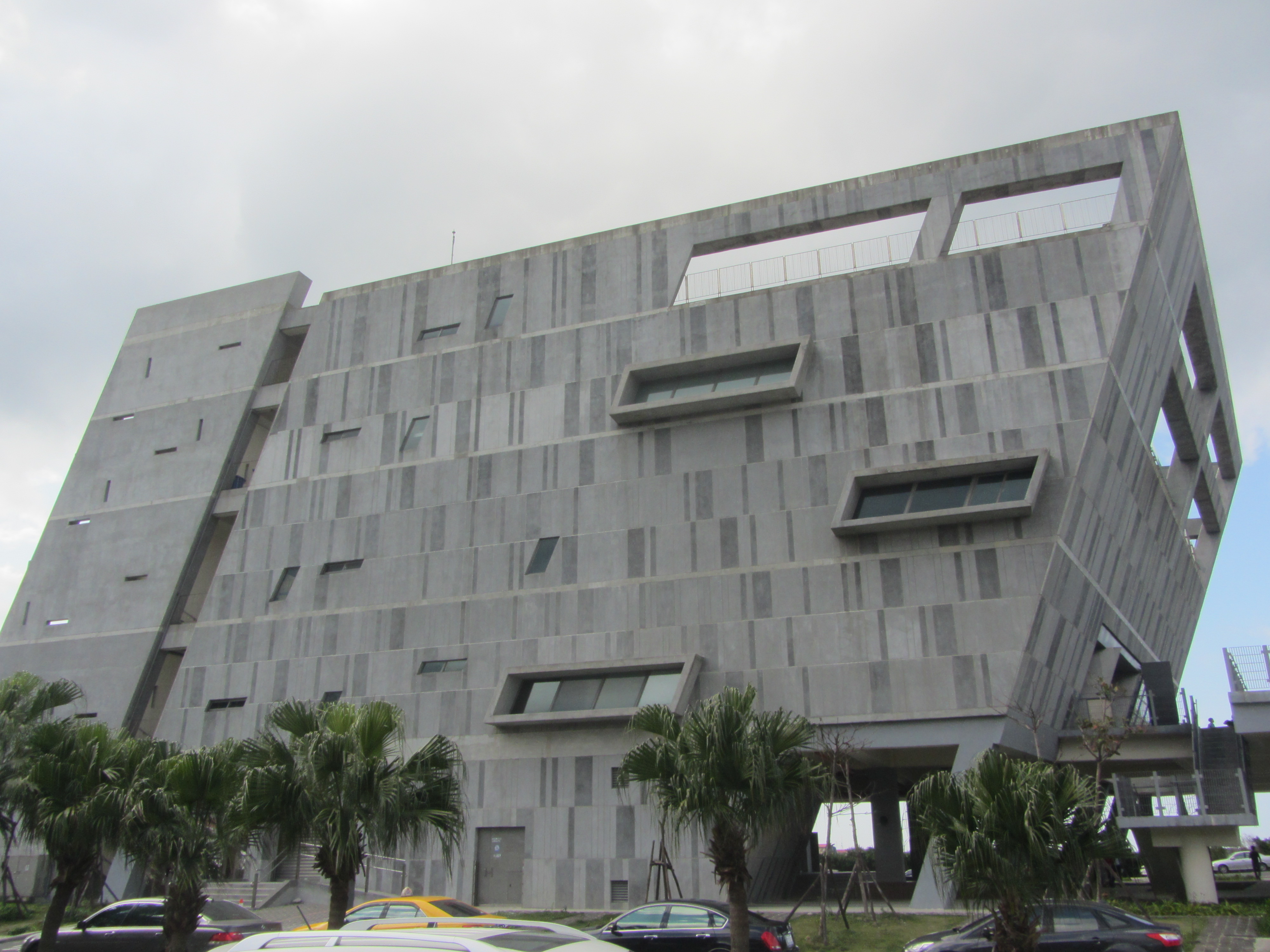
Regional Exploration Gallery

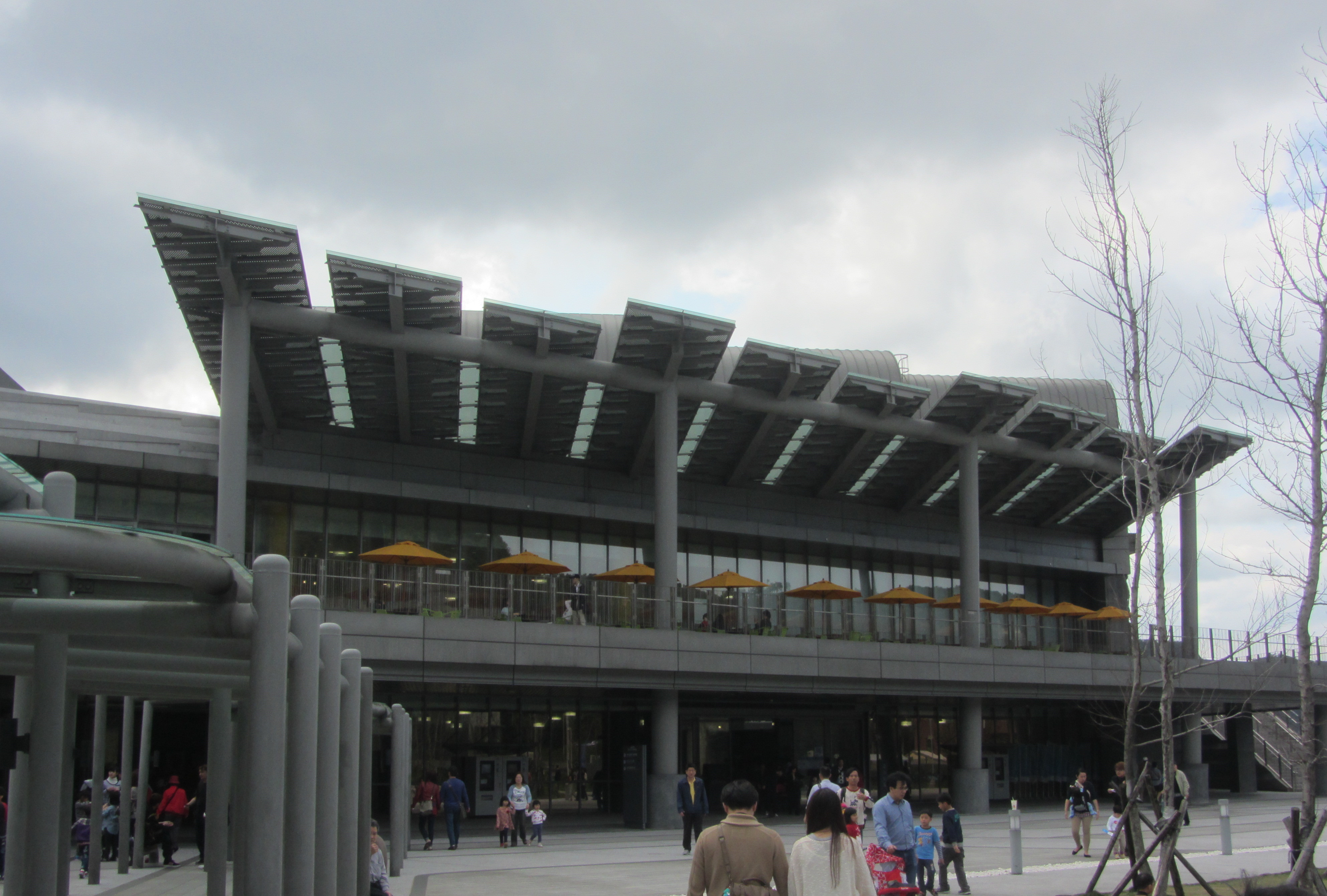
3D IMAX Marine Theater

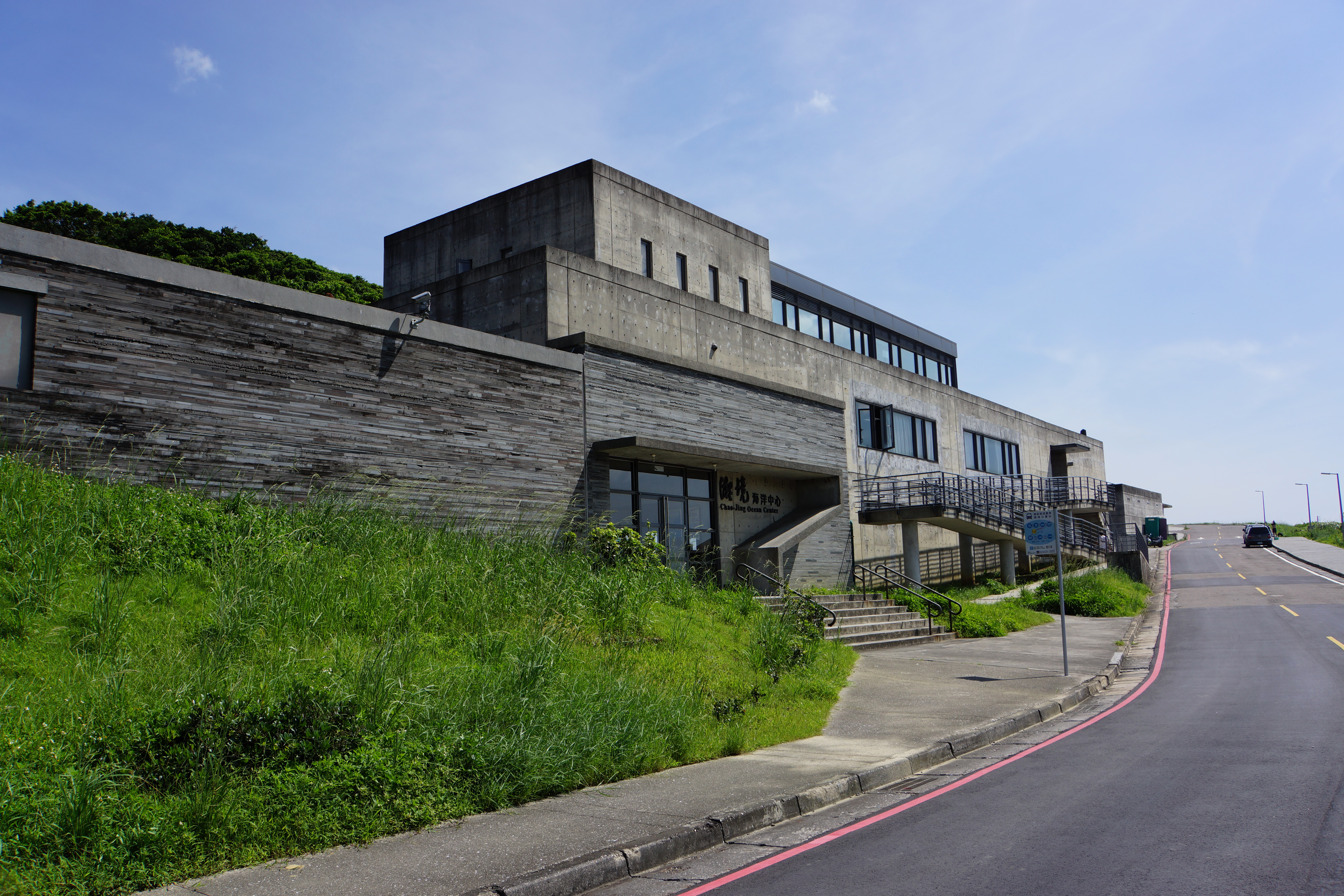
Chaojing Ocean Center

- Main Exhibition Building, Administration Center, Education Center and Archive and Research Center
  - Marine Environment Gallery
  - Marine Science Gallery
  - Naval Architecture and Ocean Engineering Gallery
  - Fishery Science Gallery
  - People and the Sea Gallery
  - Wonders of the Deep Sea Gallery
  - Deep Sea Theater
  - Kid’s Exploration Zone
  - Regional Exploration Gallery
  - 3D IMAX Marine Theater
- Rongxuan Park
- Chaojing Ocean Center and Coastal Ecology Exploration Park
- Coastal Recreation Park and Auxiliary Parking Lot

== Access ==
The museum is accessible within walking distance north of Haikeguan Station of Taiwan Railway.

== See also ==
- List of museums in Taiwan
