= Badouzi railway station =

Railway station in Zhongzheng, Keelung, Taiwan

Badouzi Station 八斗子車站
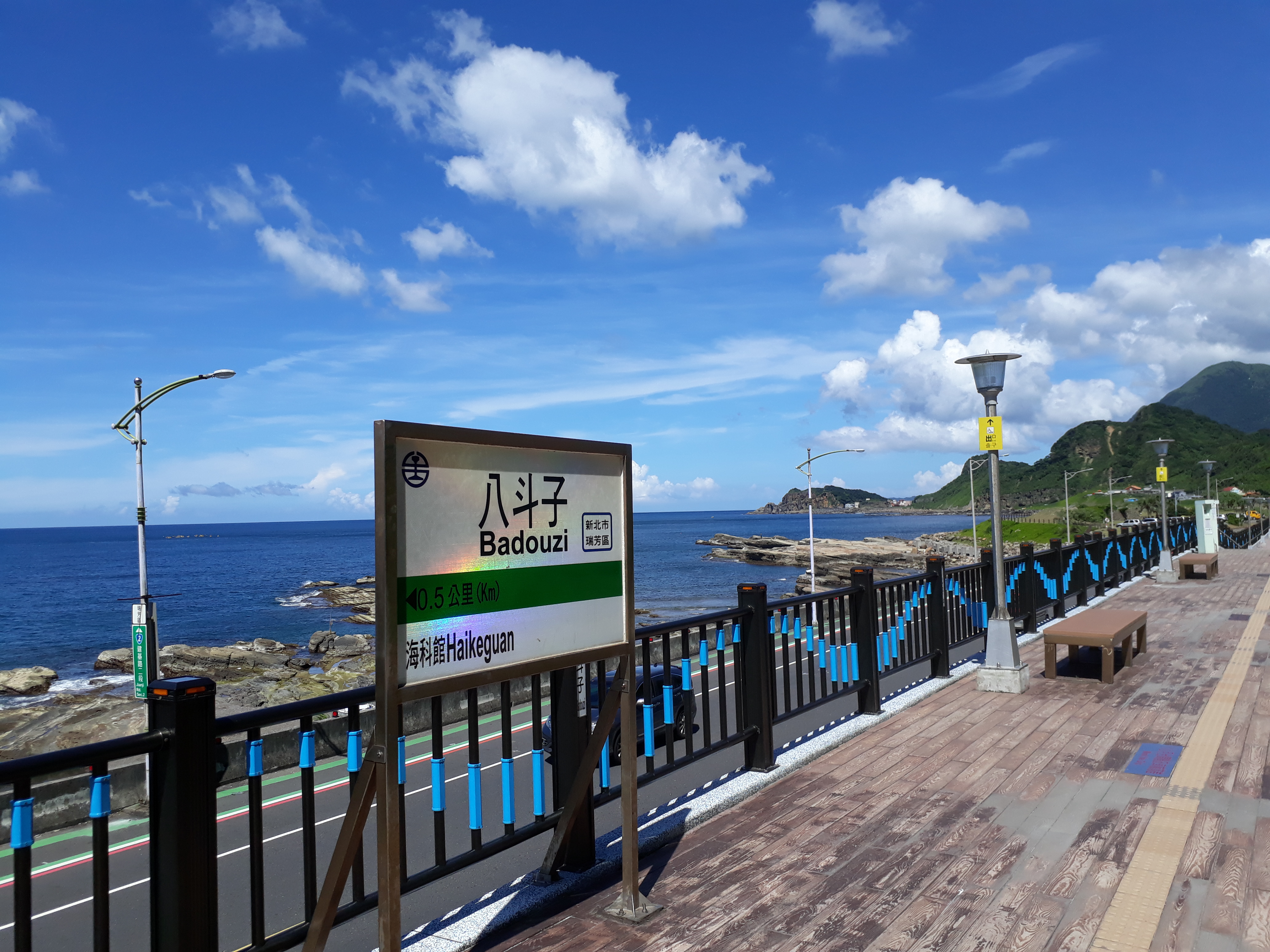

General information
- Location: Zhongzheng, Keelung, Taiwan
- Coordinates: 25°8′7.3″N 121°48′10.1″E
- System: Train station
- Owner: Taiwan Railway Corporation
- Operator: Taiwan Railway Corporation
- Line: Shen'ao
- Platforms: Side platform
- Train operators: Taiwan Railway Corporation

History
- Opened: 28 December 2016
Location

Badouzi (traditional Chinese: 八斗子車站; simplified Chinese: 八斗子车站; pinyin: Bādǒuzi Chēzhàn) is a railway station on Taiwan Railway (TR) Shen'ao line located in Ruifang District, New Taipei City, Taiwan.

== History ==
The station was opened on 28 December 2016 after a five-month renovation which cost NT$10.82 million.

== Design ==
Badouzi Station mimics the design of Duoliang, a former stop on the South-link line, giving passengers a view of local scenery.

== See also ==
- List of railway stations in Taiwan

Preceding station	Taiwan Railway	Following station
Haikeguan towards Ruifang	Shen'ao line	Terminus
