= Haikeguan railway station =

Railway station located in Keelung, Taiwan

Haikeguan Station 海科館車站
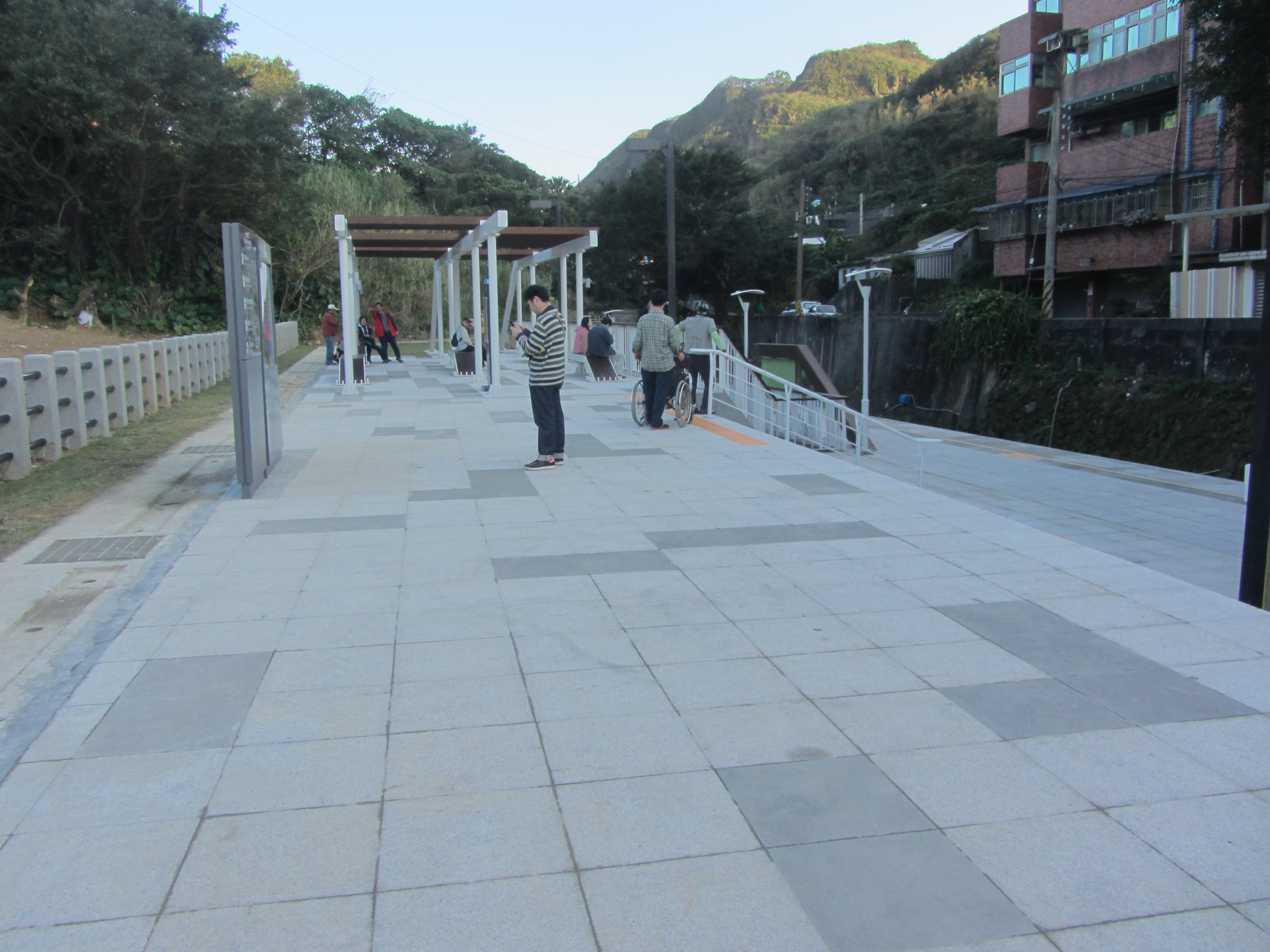

Chinese name
- Traditional Chinese: 海科館車站
Transcriptions
Standard Mandarin
- Hanyu Pinyin: Hai3ke1guan3 Chēzhàn
- Bopomofo: ㄏㄞˇ ㄎㄜ ㄍㄨㄢˇ ㄔㄜ ㄓㄢˋ

General information
- Location: Zhongzheng, Keelung; Taiwan
- Coordinates: 25°08′15.2″N 121°48′00.1″E
- System: Taiwan Railway
- Line: Shen'ao line
- Distance: 4.2 km to Ruifang
- Platforms: 1 side platform

Construction
- Structure type: At-grade

Other information
- Station code: 291

History
- Opened: 9 January 2014

Passengers
- 2017: 311,468 per year
- Rank: 101

Services
Preceding station	Taiwan Railway	Following station
Ruifang Terminus	Shen'ao line	Badouzi Terminus
Location

Haikeguan railway station (traditional Chinese: 海科館車站; simplified Chinese: 海科馆车站; pinyin: Hǎikēguǎn Chēzhàn) is a railway station located in Zhongzheng, Keelung, Taiwan. It is located on the Shen'ao line and is operated by the Taiwan Railway.

The station is the northernmost operational railway station in Taiwan. It is named after the nearby National Museum of Marine Science and Technology.

== History ==
The station was opened on 9 January 2014

== Around the station ==
- Badouzi Fishing Port
- National Museum of Marine Science and Technology
