= Heping Island Park =

Park in Zhongzheng, Keelung, Taiwan

- 和平島公園
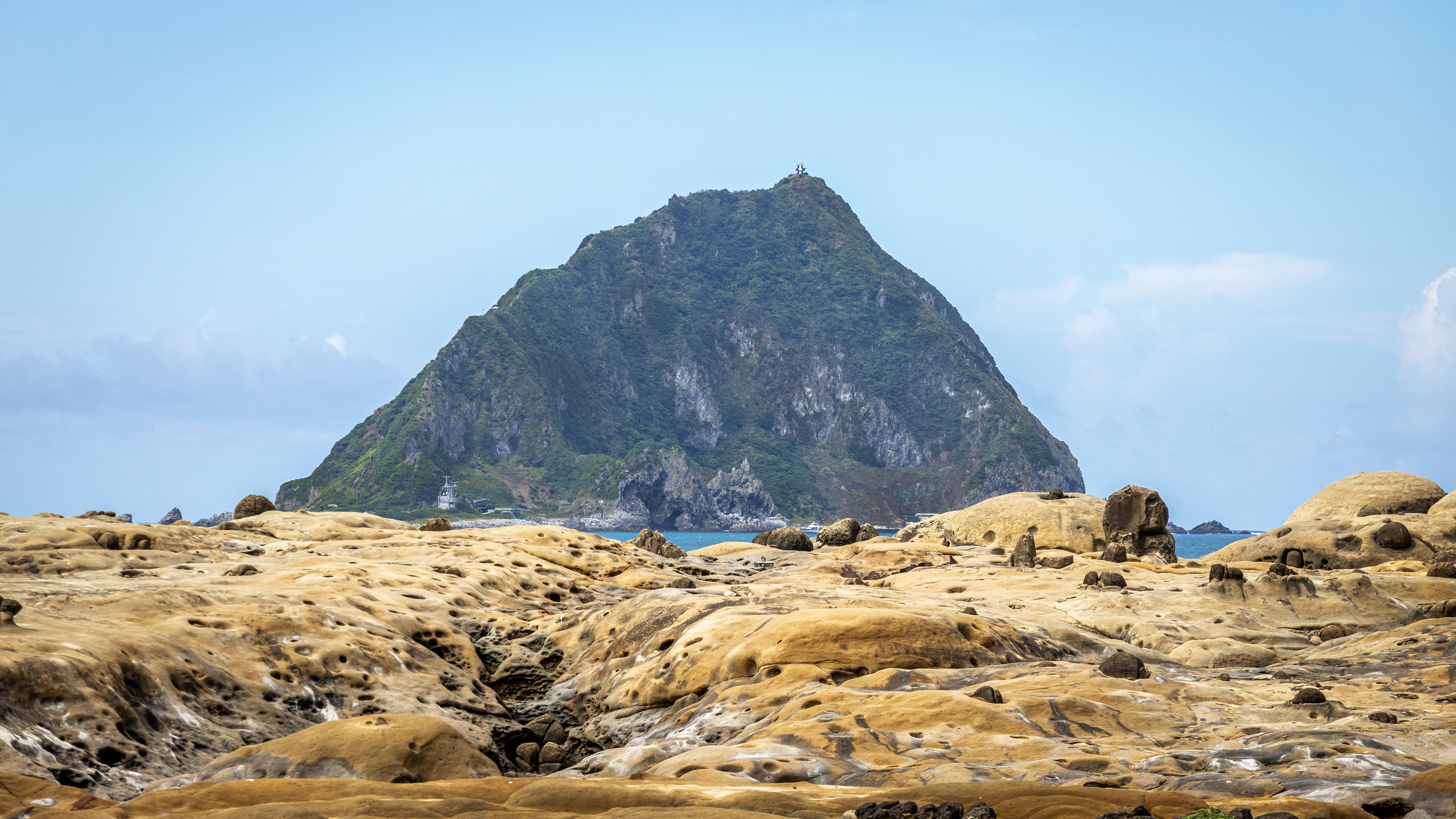
- Interactive map of Heping Island Park
- Type: park
- Location: Zhongzheng, Keelung, Taiwan
- Coordinates: 25°09′39.6″N 121°45′50.2″E
- Website: Official website

Heping Island Park (Chinese: 和平島公園; pinyin: Hépíng Dǎo Gōngyuán) is a park in Heping Island, Zhongzheng District, Keelung, Taiwan.

== History ==
Strong wind over the years had eroded the coastal area of Heping Island, forming rocks with special shapes. The park used to be under military control for a long period of time. However, the ban was gradually lifted in the 1960s and 1970s. Since then, more tourists have come to the area. Parts of the parks were close starting the end of 2010 and was fully reopened to the public in June 2012.

== Features ==
The park island is connected to Keelung mainland with the Heping Bridge. The park consists of its vast mushroom-shaped rocks.

== Transportation ==
The park is accessible by bus from bus stop nearby Keelung Station of Taiwan Railway.

== See also ==
- List of parks in Taiwan
