= Pengjia Lighthouse =

Lighthouse in Zhongzheng, Keelung, Taiwan

Pengjia Lighthouse 彭佳嶼燈塔
- Location: Pengjia Islet, Keelung, Zhongzheng, Taiwan
- Coordinates: 25.630088°N 122.080252°E

Tower
- Constructed: 1897 (first)
- Construction: Brick tower
- Height: 28.6 metres (94 ft)
- Shape: Cylindrical tower with balcony and lantern on a hexagonal prism basement
- Markings: White tower, black lantern dome
- Operator: Maritime and Port Bureau
- Heritage: list of national monuments of Taiwan

Light
- First lit: 1909 (current)
- Focal height: 145.4 metres (477 ft)
- Intensity: 864,000 candela
- Range: 25.3 nautical miles (46.9 km; 29.1 mi)
- Characteristic: Fl W 15s.

The Pengjia Lighthouse (traditional Chinese: 彭佳嶼燈塔; simplified Chinese: 彭佳屿灯塔; pinyin: Péngjiā Yǔ Dēngtǎ) is a lighthouse in Pengjia Islet, Zhongzheng District, Keelung, Taiwan.

== History ==
The first phase construction of the lighthouse started in 1906 and completed in 1908. It started its service on 20 September 1909. In December 2015, the lighthouse was designated as a historic site by the Keelung City Government.

== Architecture ==
The lighthouse was designed with brick and tubular structure and equipped with incandescent oil lamp standing at 26.2 meters high. The lighthouse is currently staffed by five workers.

== See also ==
- List of lighthouses in Taiwan
