= Keelung Fort Commander's Official Residence =

Former residence in Zhongzheng, Keelung, Taiwan

- 基隆要塞司令官邸
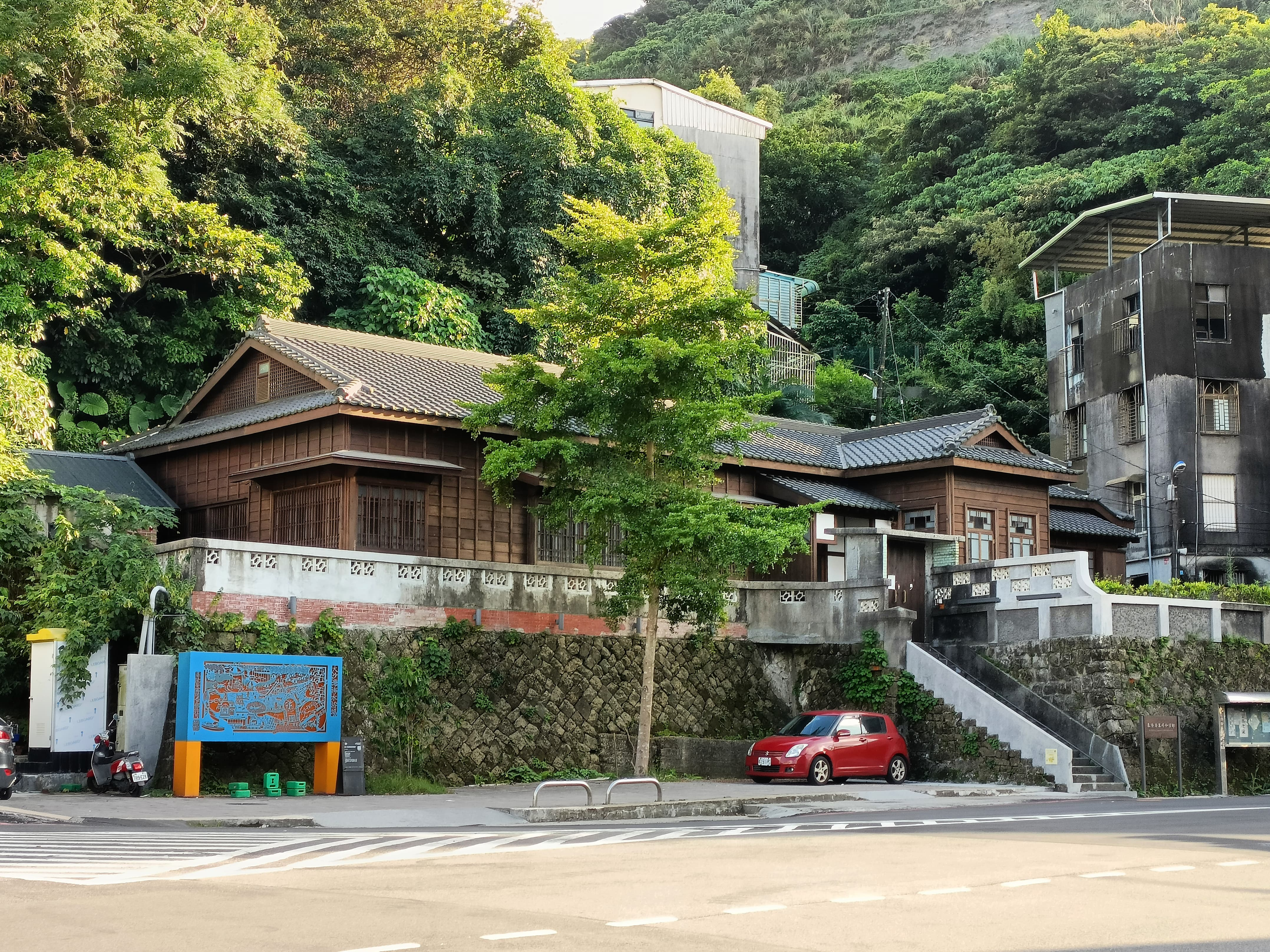
- Interactive map of the Keelung Fort Commander's Official Residence area

General information
- Type: former residence
- Architectural style: Japanese
- Location: Zhongzheng, Keelung, Taiwan
- Coordinates: 25°08′25.5″N 121°45′29.4″E
- Completed: 1931

Design and construction
- Architect: Isuke Nagami

The Keelung Fort Commander's Official Residence (Chinese: 基隆要塞司令官邸; pinyin: Jīlóng Yàosài Sīlìng Guāndǐ) is a former residence in Zhongzheng District, Keelung City, Taiwan.

== History ==
The building was constructed in 1931 during the Japanese rule of Taiwan for the residence of Keelung Nagami Bus company employees, in which the company was located at the north of the building. It was built by the company owner, Isuke Nagami. After the handover of Taiwan from Japan to the Republic of China in 1945, due to the original commander's residence having been bombed, the Fortification Command used this building as the temporary Commander's Residence. The building was later rented by the Li family, thus it got its name Li's house. On 13 April 2021, the Keelung City Cultural Affairs Bureau announced that the residence would be opened to the public on weekends.

== Architecture ==
The building is a combination of Japanese and Western styles. The main building is located on the north side, while the receiving room and the Japanese garden are on the south side. The building is equipped with lamps which are lit every evening.

== Transportation ==
The building is accessible north east of Keelung Station of Taiwan Railway.

== See also ==
- List of tourist attractions in Taiwan
