= Shen'ao line =

Railway branch line of Taiwan Railway

Shen'ao Line
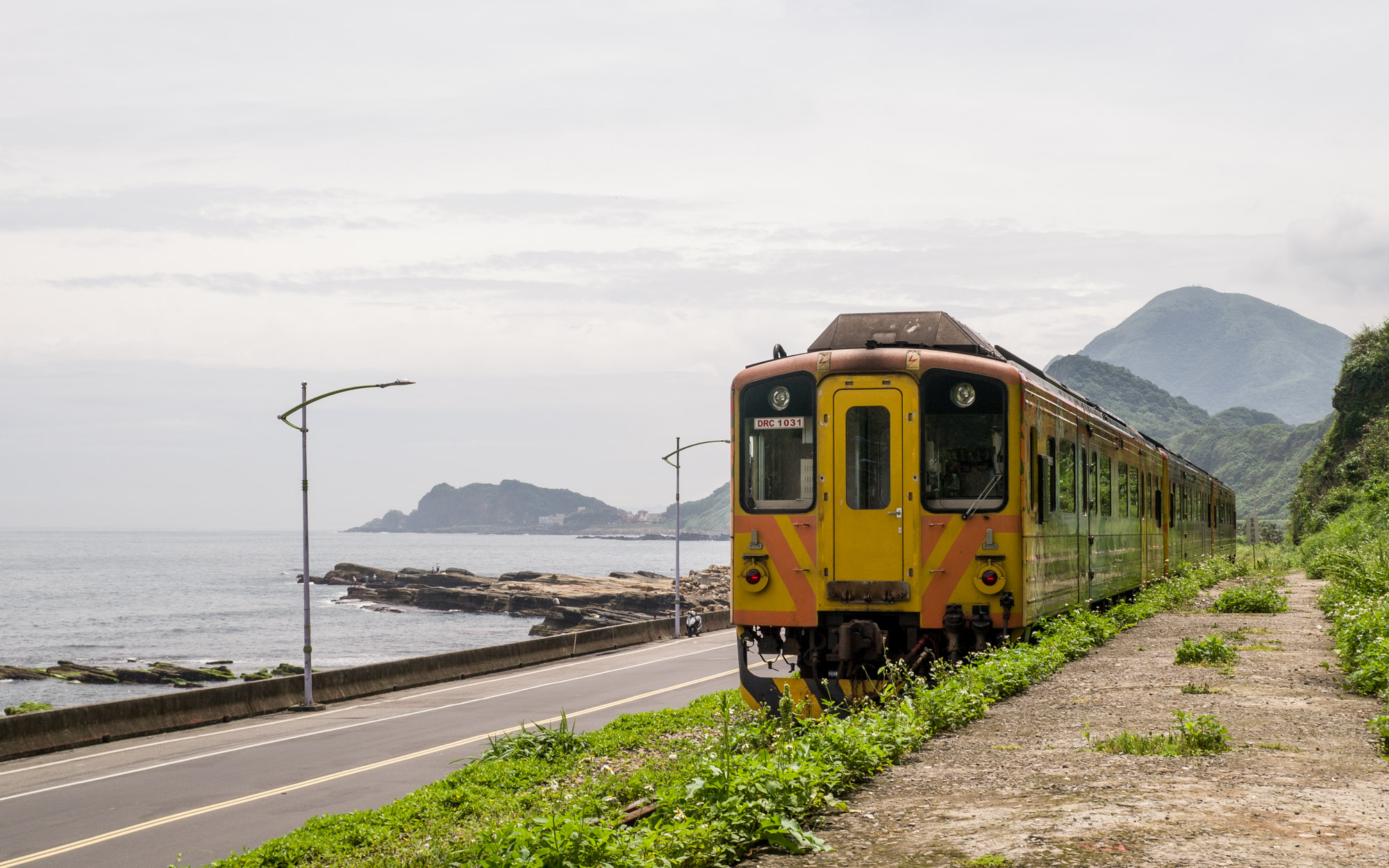

Overview
- Native name: 深澳線
- Owner: Taiwan Railway Corporation
- Termini: Ruifang; Badouzi
- Stations: 3

Service
- Operator(s): Taiwan Railway Corporation

Technical
- Line length: 4.6 km (2.9 mi)
- Number of tracks: 1

The Shen'ao line (Chinese: 深澳線; pinyin: Shēn'ào Xiàn; Pe̍h-ōe-jī: Chhim-ò Soàⁿ) is a 4.6 km long, single-track railway branch line of the Taiwan Railway. It runs through Ruifang in New Taipei and Zhongzheng in Keelung.

== History ==
The railroad was originally built on 25 August 1967. The line was initially built to transport coal but later added a passenger service, though passenger service was suspended in 1989. It opened again in 2016, but the extending line from Badouzi Station (Chinese: 八斗子) onwards was disused.

== Services ==
All trains have through service to the Yilan line.

== Stations ==
Name	Chinese	Hokkien	Hakka	Transfers and notes	Location	
Ruifang	瑞芳	Sūi-hong	Lui-fông	→ Yilan line	Ruifang	New Taipei
Haikeguan	海科館	Hái-kho-koán	Hói-khô-kón	The northernmost operational railway station in Taiwan	Zhongzheng	Keelung
Badouzi	八斗子	Pat-táu-chí	Pat-teú-chṳ́		Zhongzheng	Keelung
