= Pengjia Islet =

Island in Taiwan

Coordinates: 25°37′46″N 122°4′17″E

Native name: 彭佳嶼
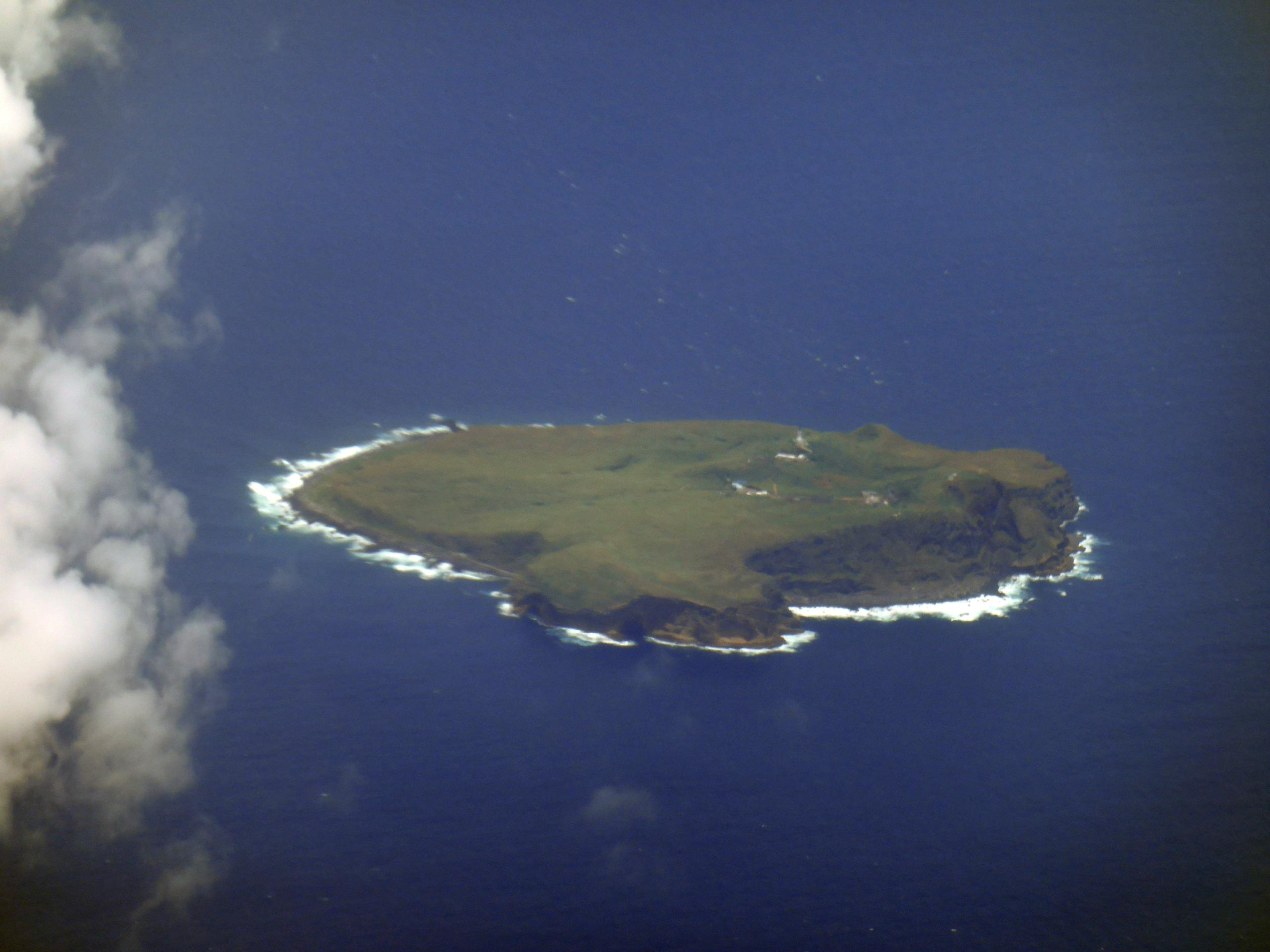

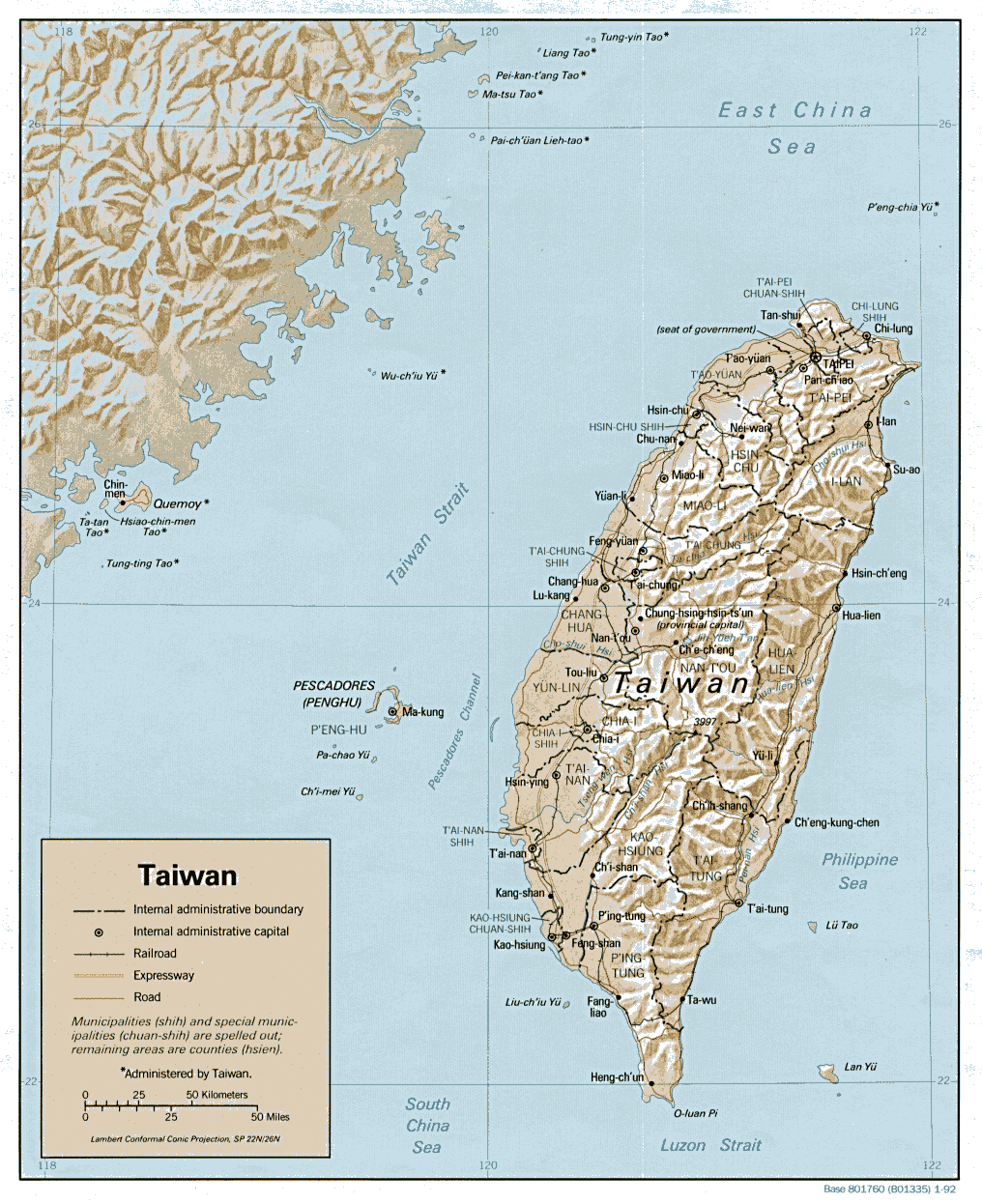
- P'eng-chia Yü north of Taiwan Island

Geography
- Location: Zhongzheng, Keelung, Taiwan
- Area: 1.14 km^{2} (0.44 sq mi)

Administration
- Republic of China (Taiwan)
- Province: Taiwan (streamlined)
- Provincial city: Keelung
- District: Zhongzheng

Additional information
- Time zone: National Standard Time (UTC+8)

Location of Pengjia Islet

Pengjia Islet (Chinese: 彭佳嶼; pinyin: péng jiā yǔ), also known as P'eng-chia Hsü, Hōka-sho, Agincourt, Dashihshan Islet, Chaolai Islet, P'eng-chia Yü or Pengchia Islet, is an islet north of Taiwan and is administered under Zhongzheng District, Keelung City. It is under Taiwanese military control and cannot be visited by ordinary citizens.

== History ==
In September 1984, forty plus fishing boats from Japan intruded on the territorial waters of Pengchia Islet (Pengjia Islet). Their catch was estimated to be worth 20 million TWD.

On 7 September 2012 and again on 9 April 2016, President Ma Ying-jeou visited Pengjia Islet.

== Geography ==
Pengjia Islet part of Zhongzheng, Keelung, Taiwan (ROC). The islet is located to the northeast of Keelung. The islet is surrounded by cliffs on its eastern, southern and northern sides. On the western side, the sea is full of reef and rocks. The only safe way to land on the island is via the dock on the southwestern side.

== Climate ==
Climate data for Pengjia Islet (1991–2020 normals, extremes 1910–present）
Month	Jan	Feb	Mar	Apr	May	Jun	Jul	Aug	Sep	Oct	Nov	Dec	Year
Record high °C (°F)	26.4 (79.5)	27.5 (81.5)	28.8 (83.8)	30.8 (87.4)	32.7 (90.9)	33.9 (93.0)	35.9 (96.6)	35.6 (96.1)	34.0 (93.2)	32.8 (91.0)	29.2 (84.6)	28.4 (83.1)	35.9 (96.6)
Mean daily maximum °C (°F)	17.9 (64.2)	18.5 (65.3)	20.3 (68.5)	23.4 (74.1)	26.4 (79.5)	29.3 (84.7)	31.3 (88.3)	31.1 (88.0)	29.0 (84.2)	25.9 (78.6)	23.1 (73.6)	19.6 (67.3)	24.7 (76.4)
Daily mean °C (°F)	15.8 (60.4)	16.2 (61.2)	17.7 (63.9)	20.7 (69.3)	23.6 (74.5)	26.3 (79.3)	28.1 (82.6)	28.0 (82.4)	26.4 (79.5)	23.8 (74.8)	21.1 (70.0)	17.6 (63.7)	22.1 (71.8)
Mean daily minimum °C (°F)	13.9 (57.0)	14.2 (57.6)	15.5 (59.9)	18.5 (65.3)	21.6 (70.9)	24.3 (75.7)	26.0 (78.8)	25.9 (78.6)	24.7 (76.5)	22.2 (72.0)	19.4 (66.9)	15.8 (60.4)	20.2 (68.3)
Record low °C (°F)	2.4 (36.3)	4.5 (40.1)	5.2 (41.4)	7.8 (46.0)	12.8 (55.0)	15.5 (59.9)	18.9 (66.0)	19.9 (67.8)	18.0 (64.4)	12.7 (54.9)	6.0 (42.8)	4.4 (39.9)	2.4 (36.3)
Average precipitation mm (inches)	115.9 (4.56)	122.2 (4.81)	134.9 (5.31)	130.0 (5.12)	193.8 (7.63)	190.9 (7.52)	109.6 (4.31)	185.9 (7.32)	196.7 (7.74)	124.5 (4.90)	121.9 (4.80)	127.0 (5.00)	1,753.3 (69.02)
Average precipitation days (≥ 0.1 mm)	16.3	15.4	17.0	13.8	13.2	11.5	6.2	9.7	11.1	11.1	14.4	14.9	154.6
Average relative humidity (%)	77.6	79.4	80.6	82.0	84.6	87.5	85.6	85.1	82.5	77.0	77.9	76.1	81.3
Mean monthly sunshine hours	62.3	62.7	90.8	110.2	143.0	177.9	276.2	253.6	203.6	154.8	94.1	65.9	1,695.1
Source: Central Weather Bureau

== Demographics ==
There are no long-term residents on the islet. As of 2002, there were about 40 itinerant residents living on the island, who are mostly employees of the weather observatory and coast guard divisions.

The island had over 100 inhabitants in the 1890s, when George MacKay wrote From Far Formosa (see page 185).

== Infrastructures ==
- Pengjia Lighthouse

== Maps ==
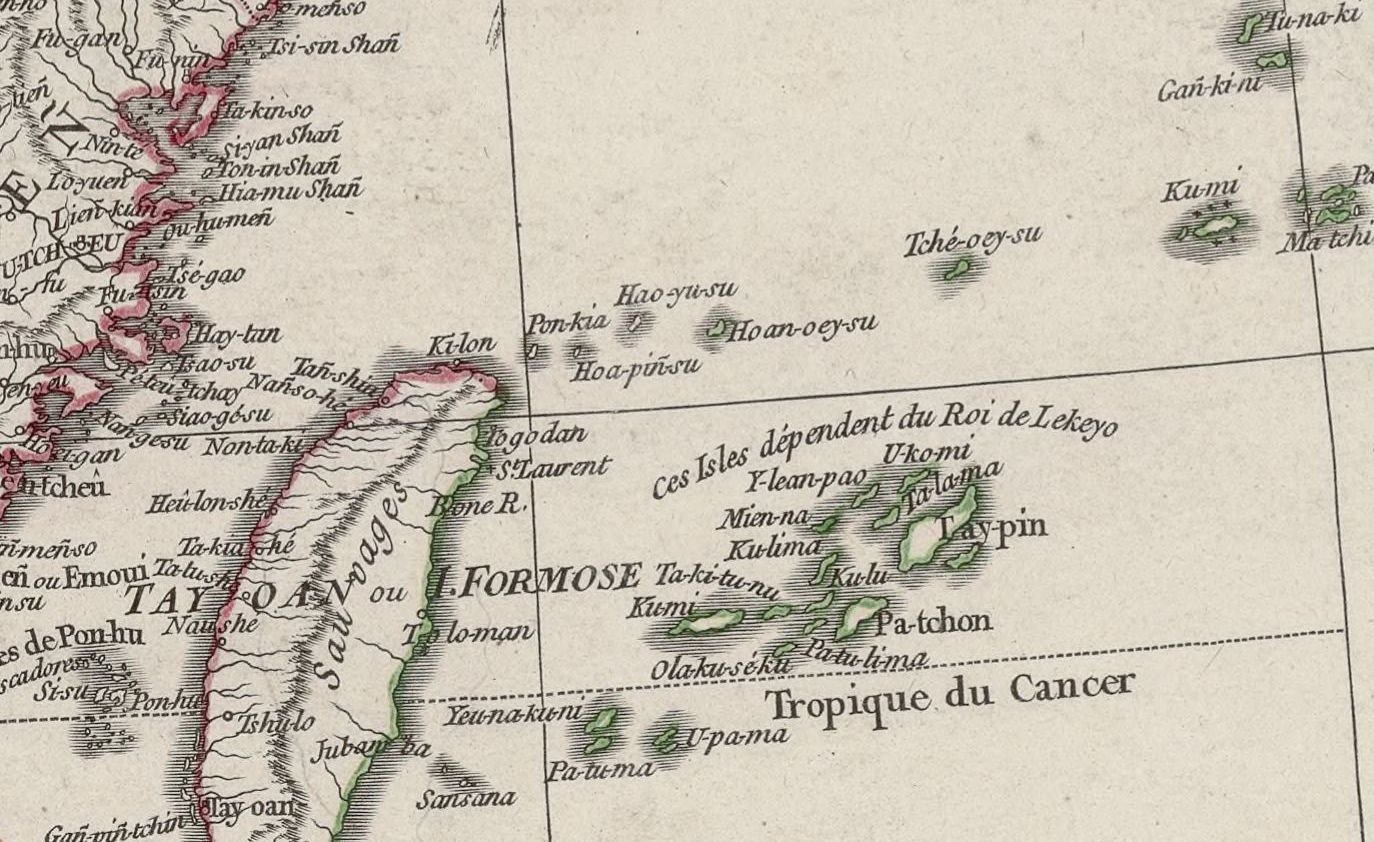
Map including Pengjia Islet (labeled as Pon-kia) (1752)

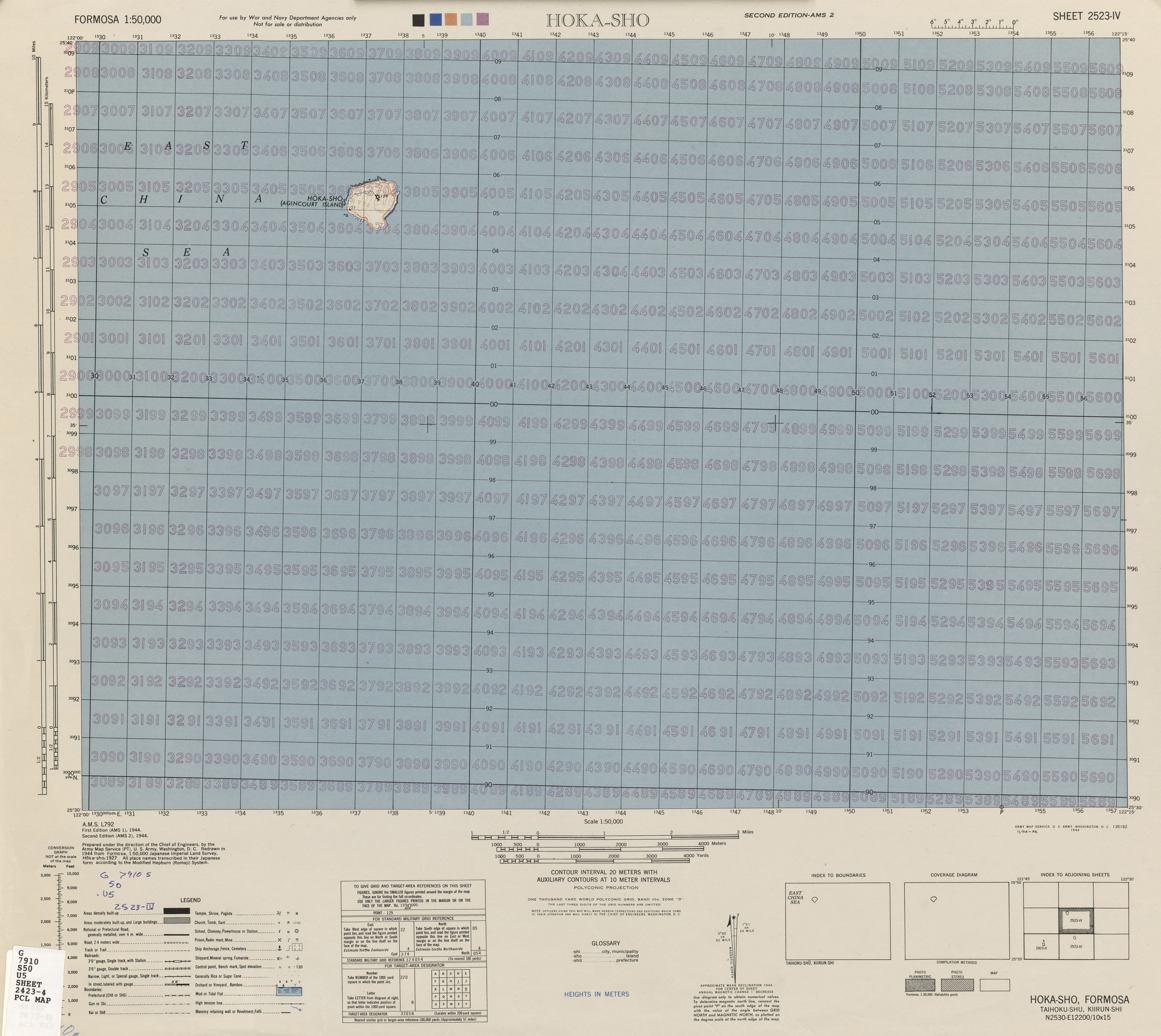
Map of Pengjia Islet (labeled as HŌKA-SHO (AGINCOURT ISLAND)) (AMS, 1944)

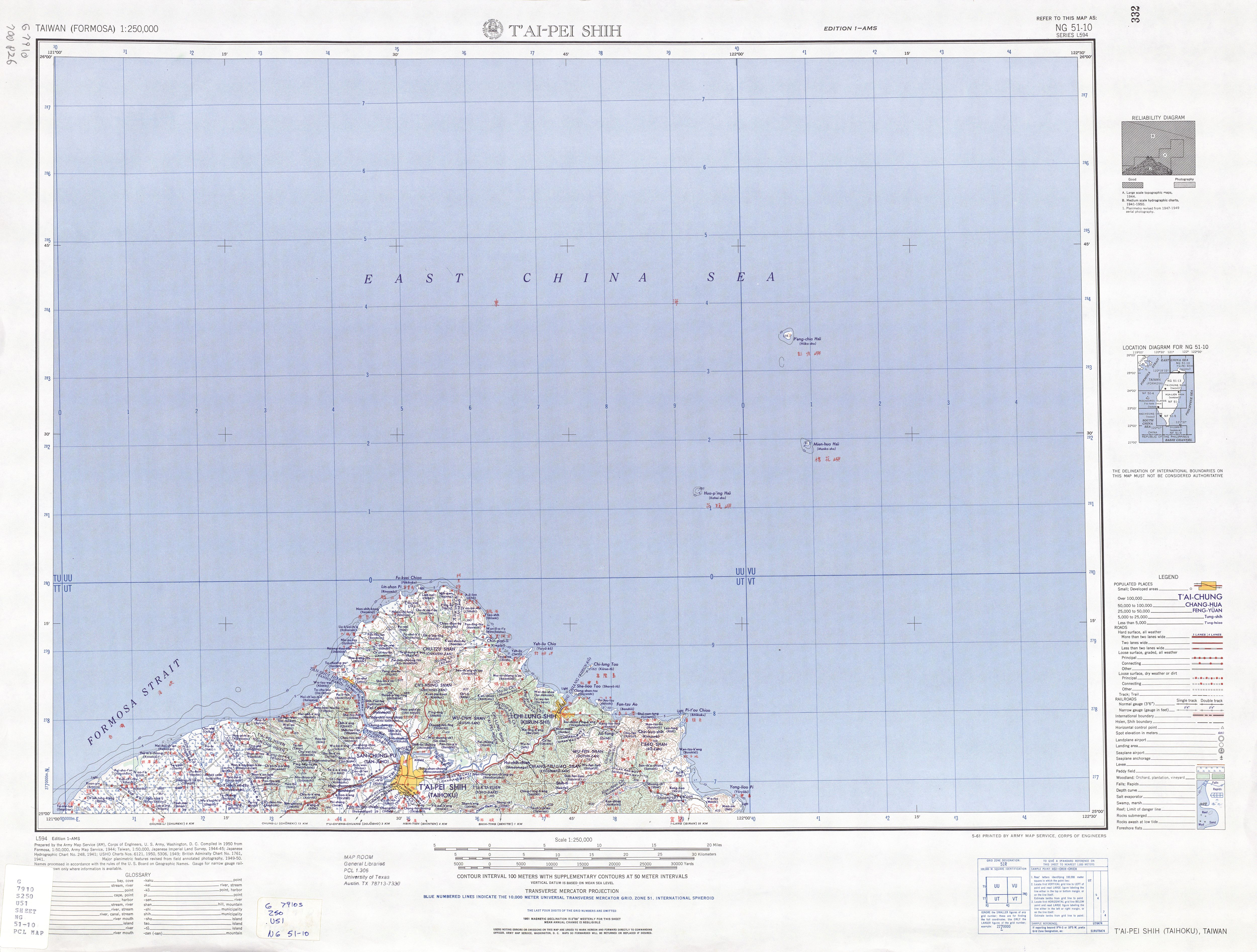
Map including Pengjia Islet (labeled as P'eng-chia Hsü (Hōka-sho) 彭佳嶼) (AMS, 1950)

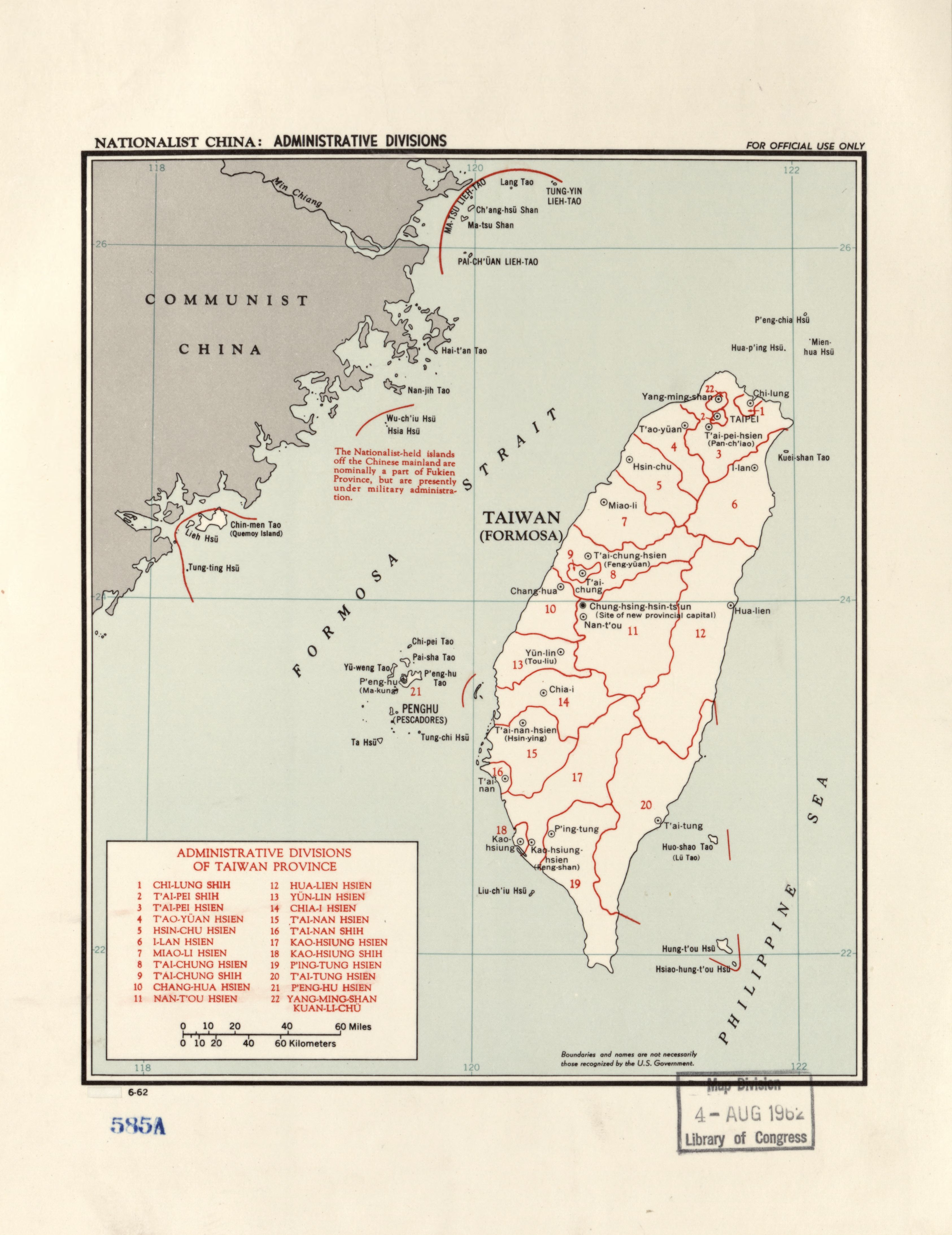
Map including Pengjia Islet (labeled as P'eng-chia Hsü) (1962)

== See also ==
- List of islands of Taiwan
- List of Taiwanese superlatives
