= List of tallest buildings and structures in Keelung =

Skyline of Keelung
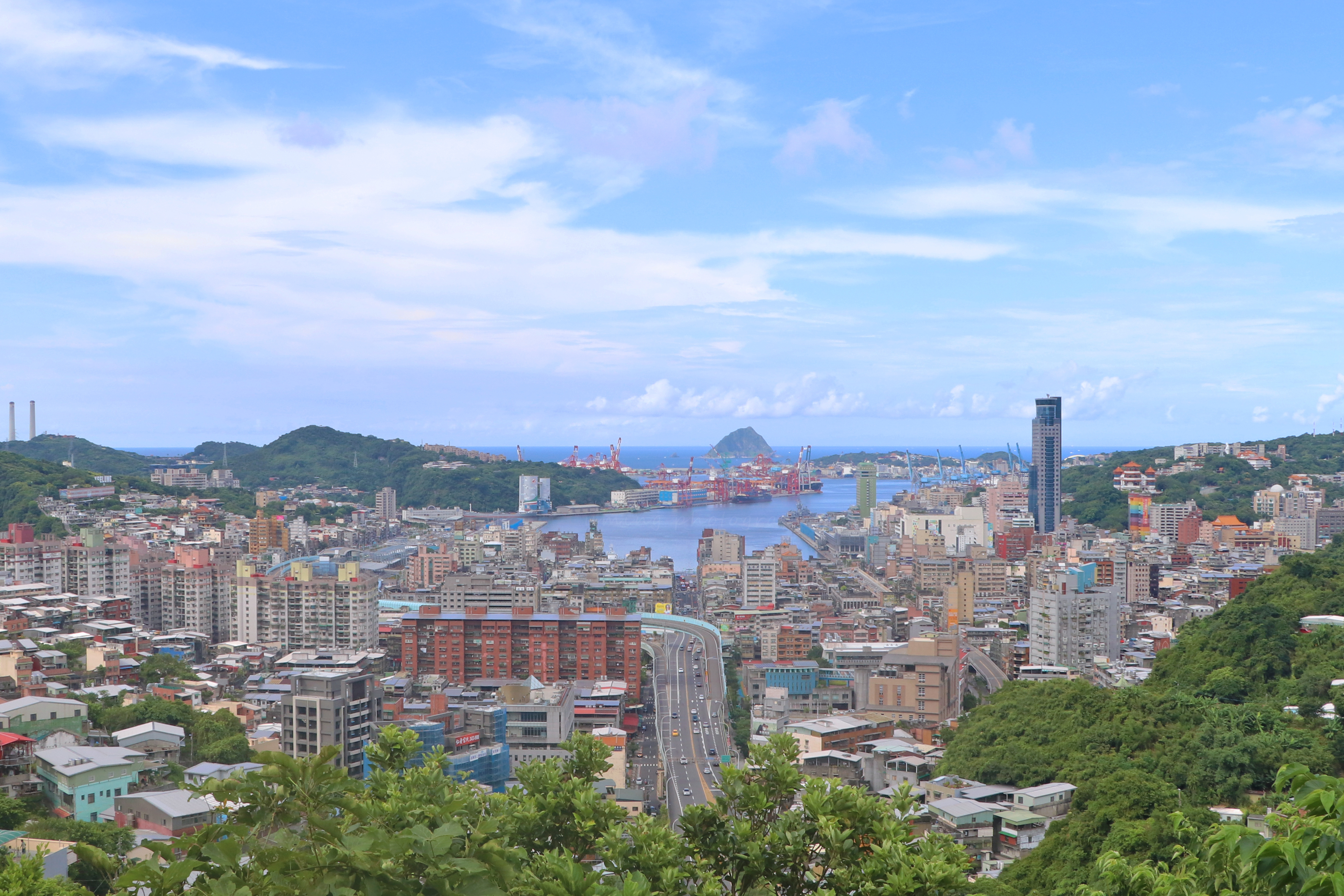
- Tallest building: Crown Commercial Building (2001)
- Tallest building height: 148 m (486 ft)

This list of the tallest buildings and structures in Keelung ranks buildings and structures in the city of Keelung in Taiwan, by height. The tallest building in the city is Crown Commercial Building at 148 m (486 ft), a mixed-used high-rise completed in 2001. The tallest structure is the three chimneys of the Hsieh-ho Power Plant, which rises to a height of 200 m (660 ft).

There are at least 10 structures in the city taller than 80 metres (260 ft).

== Tallest structures ==
This list rank the 10 tallest structures in Keelung by total height.

Keelung Tallest Structures
Rank	Name	District	Use	Image	Height (m)	Height (ft)	Floors above ground	Year of completion	Notes
1	Hsieh-ho Power Plant, Chimney 3	Zhongshan District	Chimney		200	656	N/A	1980	
=1	Hsieh-ho Power Plant, Chimney 2	Zhongshan District	Chimney		200	656	N/A	1977	
=1	Hsieh-ho Power Plant, Chimney 1	Zhongshan District	Chimney		200	656	N/A	1977	
4	Crown Commercial Building 麗榮皇冠大樓	Xinyi District	Mixed-use		148	484	33	2001	
5	Glory Tower 東方帝景大樓	Ren-ai District	Residential		117.5	385	31	2008	
6	Port City Pearl 港都明珠	Zhongzheng District	Residential		108.65	357	29	2023	
7	Keelung Incinerator Chimney	Xinyi District	Chimney		100	328	N/A	1998	
8	The Castle 城上城 下城區	Anle District	Residential		98.3	322	22	2015	
9	Royal Private City Garden II 信義君悅II 柏悅府	Xinyi District	Residential		96.8	318	24	2014	
10	Century Landmark 世紀首席	Ren-ai District	Residential		90.5	297	25	2009	

== See also ==
- List of tallest buildings in Taiwan
- List of tallest buildings in Taipei
