= OCAM =

OCAM may refer to:

- Organization Commune Africaine et Malgache, a former organization in Africa
- YM Oceanic Culture and Art Museum, a museum in Kaohsiung, Taiwan
