= MOME =

MOME or Mome may refer to:

- Mome (comics), a U.S. comics anthology trademarked MOME
- Møme (born 1989), French DJ
- Management of Major Emergency, a qualified course for the OIM
- Archaically, an idiot
- In Discordianism, a Mome is a female version of a Pope
- "La Môme Piaf", nickname for French singer Édith Piaf
- La Môme, the French title for the film La Vie en rose, based on Piaf's life
- YM Museum of Marine Exploration Kaohsiung, a museum in Kaohsiung, Taiwan
- Moholy-Nagy University of Art and Design, a university in Budapest, Hungary (Moholy-Nagy Művészeti Egyetem)
