= Xian Dong Yan =

Buddhist cave in Keelung, Taiwan

- Fairy Cave, Deity's Cave
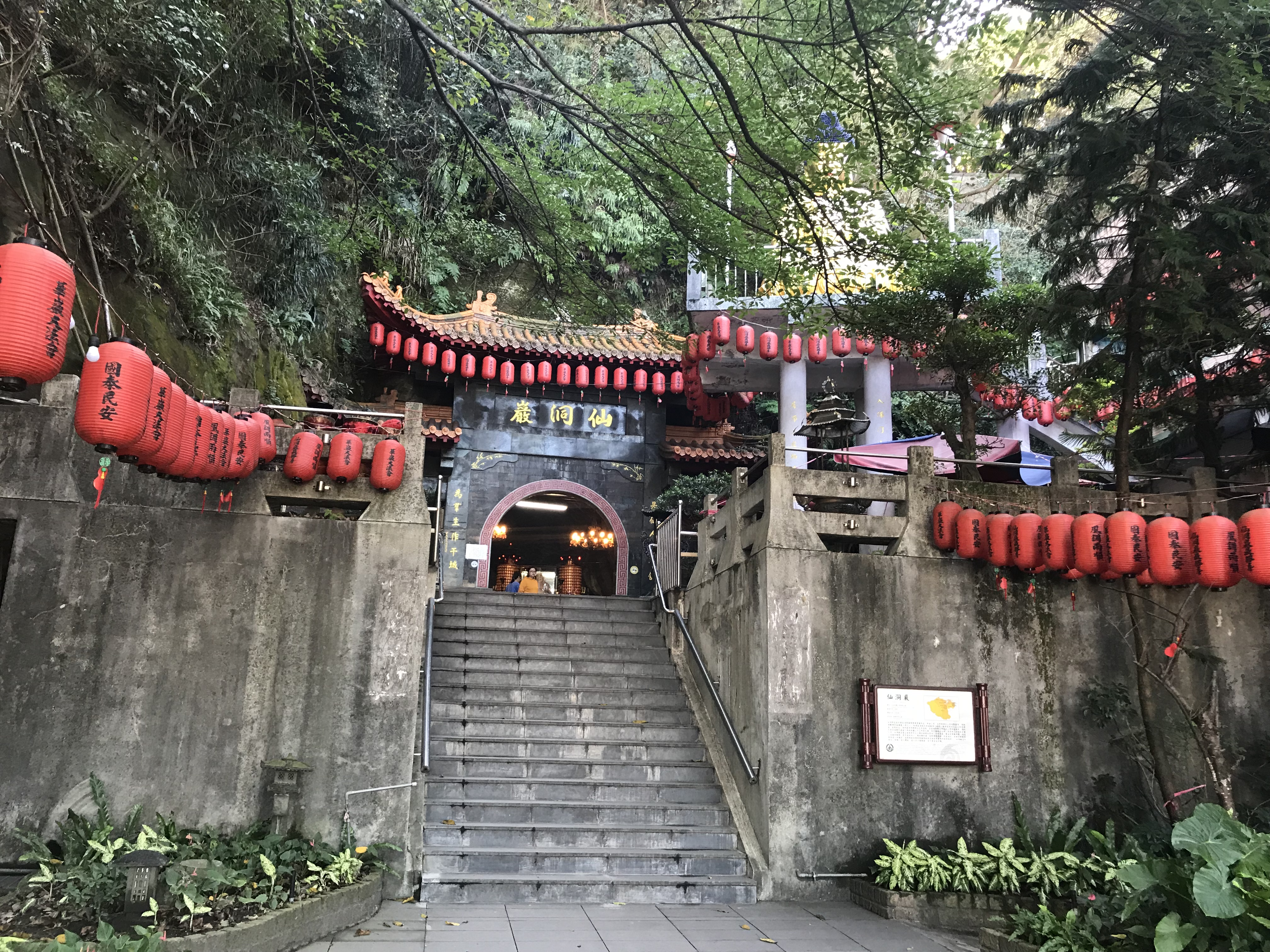

- Location within Taiwan
- Location: Zhongshan, Keelung, Taiwan
- Coordinates: 25°08′42.8″N 121°44′54.2″E
- Geology: Sea cave

Xian Dong Yan (仙洞巖), literally Immortal cave, is a natural sea cave in Zhongshan District, Keelung, Taiwan. It is a designated Cultural Landscape by the Bureau of Cultural Heritage in Taiwan. The cave was a shrine and resting place for fishermen during Qing dynasty period and was converted into a Buddhist Temple during the Japanese colonial period.
