= Keelung Fu Jen Sacred Heart Senior High School =

- 輔大聖心高級中學
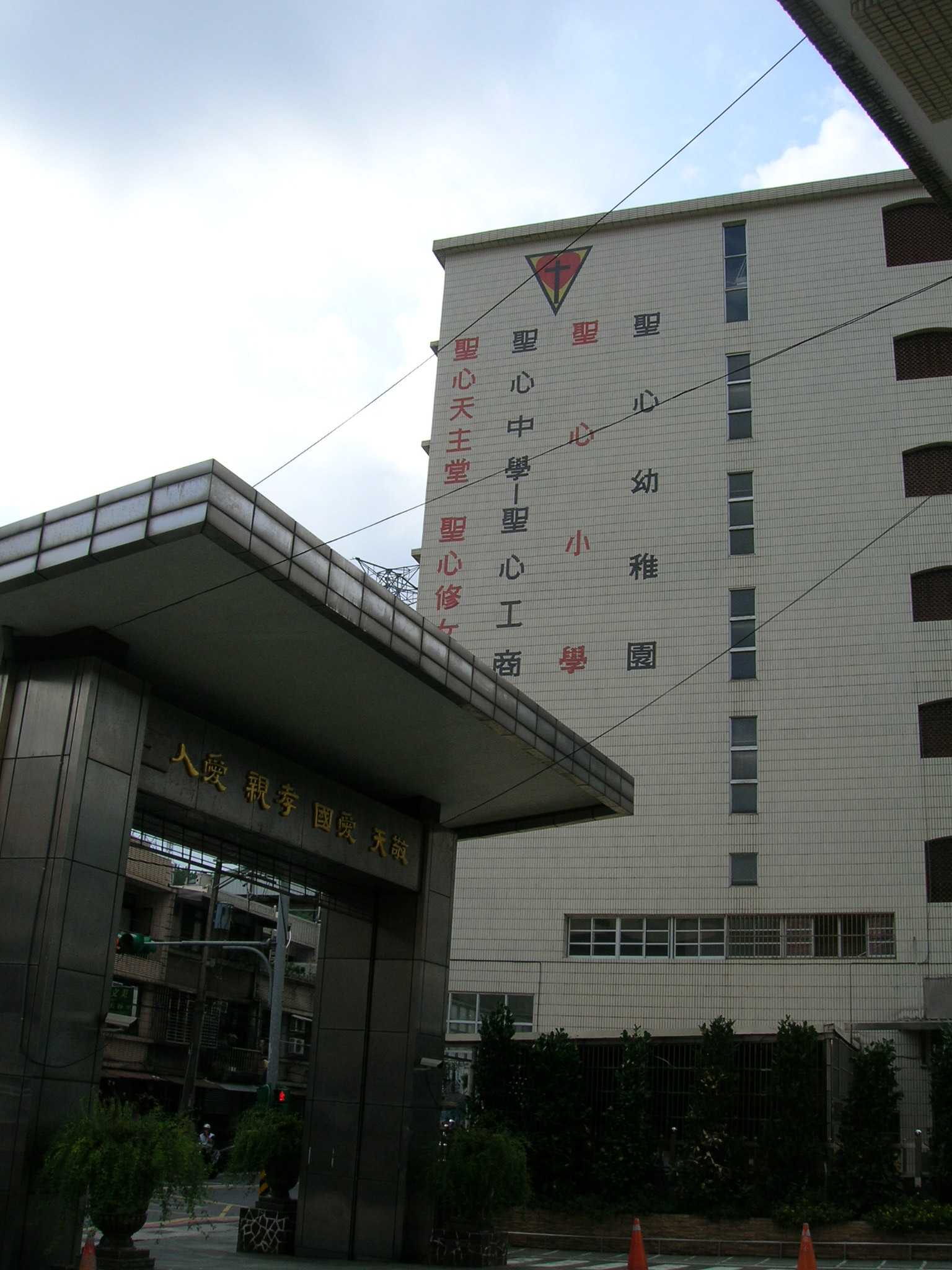

Location
- Zhongshan, Keelung, Taiwan
- Coordinates: 25°08′07.4″N 121°44′02.4″E

Information
- Type: Private high school
- Established: 1969
- Gender: Mixed
- Campus size: 3.9821 hectares
- Affiliation: Fu Jen Catholic University
- Website: shsh.kl.edu.tw

Keelung Fu Jen Sacred Heart Senior High School (SHSH; Chinese: 輔大聖心高級中學) is a private high school located in Zhongshan District, Keelung, Taiwan. It is also an affiliated school of Fu Jen Catholic University - one of the top private universities in Taiwan.

The school shares the same campus with Keelung Fu Jen Sacred Heart Elementary School.

== Organization ==
- Senior High School
- Vocational High School
- Junior High School

== Notable alumni ==
- Wu Wen-chien, marathon runner

== See also ==
- Fu Jen Catholic University
- Secondary education in Taiwan
