= W-class container ship =

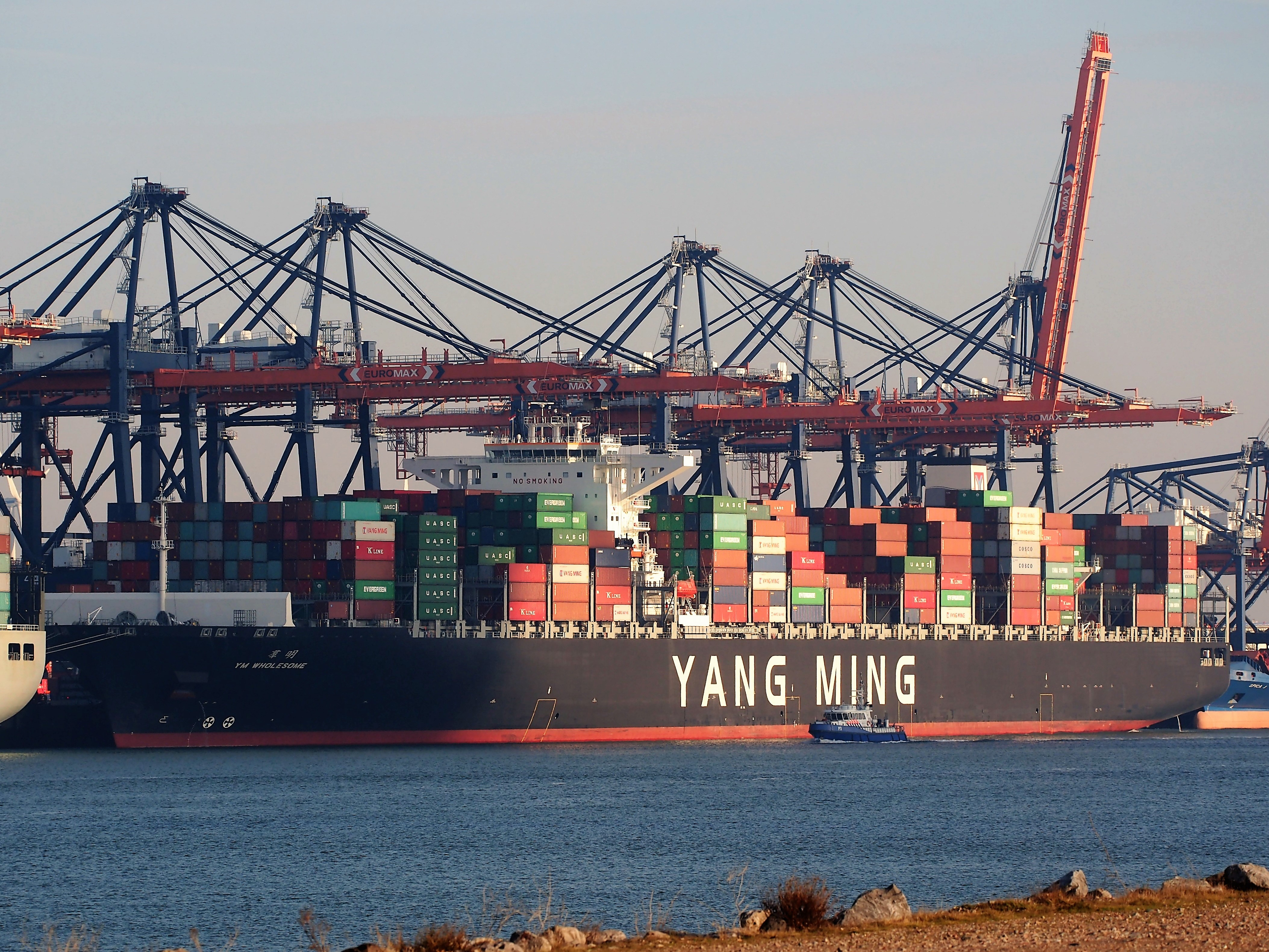
- YM Wholesome in the port of Rotterdam

Class overview
- Builders: Hyundai Heavy Industries; CSBC Corporation; Imabari Shipbuilding
- Operators: Yang Ming Marine Transport Corporation
- In service: 2015-present
- Planned: 20
- Building: 0
- Completed: 20
- Active: 20

General characteristics (HHI)
- Type: Container ship
- Tonnage: 144,651 GT
- Length: 368 m (1,207 ft)
- Beam: 51 m (167 ft)
- Draught: 16.025 m (52.58 ft)
- Capacity: 14,080 TEU

General characteristics (CSBC)
- Type: Container ship
- Tonnage: 145,136 GT
- Length: 368 m (1,207 ft)
- Beam: 51 m (167 ft)
- Draught: 16.025 m (52.58 ft)
- Capacity: 14,078 TEU to 14,198 TEU

General characteristics (Imabari)
- Type: Container ship
- Tonnage: 151,451 GT
- Length: 366.4 m (1,202 ft)
- Beam: 51.2 m (168 ft)
- Draught: 15.5 m (51 ft)
- Capacity: 14,220 TEU

The W class is a series of 20 container ships operated by Yang Ming Marine Transport Corporation. The maximum theoretical capacity of the ships is between 14,078 and 14,200 TEU.

== History ==
The order for the first 15 ships was announced in 2013. The ships would be chartered from Seaspan Corporation for a length of 10 years. Ten of the ships would be built by Hyundai Heavy Industries and the remaining five would be built by CSBC Corporation, Taiwan. The first ship was delivered in 2015.

In 2015 Yang Ming ordered another 5 container ships. This time the ships would be built by Imabari Shipbuilding and they would be chartered from Shoei Kisen Kaisha.

== List of ships ==
| Ship | Yard number | IMO number | Delivery | Status | ref |
Hyundai Heavy Industries
| YM Wish | 2638 | 9684641 | 1 Apr 2015 | In service | |
| YM World | 2639 | 9684653 | 10 Apr 2015 | In service | |
| YM Wellhead | 2640 | 9684665 | 17 Apr 2015 | In service | |
| YM Wondrous | 2641 | 9684677 | 22 May 2015 | In service | |
| YM Winner | 2642 | 9684689 | 5 Jun 2015 | In service | |
| YM Witness | 2643 | 9704609 | 29 Jun 2015 | In service | |
| YM Wholesome | 2644 | 9704611 | 20 Jul 2015 | In service | |
| YM Wellness | 2645 | 9704623 | 17 Aug 2015 | In service | |
| YM Worth | 2646 | 9704635 | 14 Sep 2015 | In service | |
| YM Warmth | 2647 | 9704647 | 8 Oct 2015 | In service | |
CSBC Corporation
| YM Window | 1036 | 9708435 | 6 May 2016 | In service | |
| YM Width | 1037 | 9708447 | 27 May 2016 | In service | |
| YM Welcome | 1038 | 9708459 | 12 Aug 2016 | In service | |
| YM Wind | 1039 | 9708461 | 26 May 2017 | In service | |
| YM Wreath | 1040 | 9708473 | 26 Jun 2017 | In service | |
Imabari Shipbuilding Hiroshima Shipyard
| YM Wellbeing | 2621 | 9820908 | 4 Oct 2018 | In service | |
| YM Wonderland | 2622 | 9820910 | 21 Jan 2019 | In service | |
| YM Wisdom | 2623 | 9757216 | 28 Feb 2019 | In service | |
| YM Warranty | 2625 | 9757228 | 16 Mar 2019 | In service | |
| YM Wellspring | 2626 | 9757230 | 28 Mar 2019 | In service | |
