= Zhongzheng Park (Keelung) =

Park in Xinyi, Keelung, Taiwan

- 中正公園
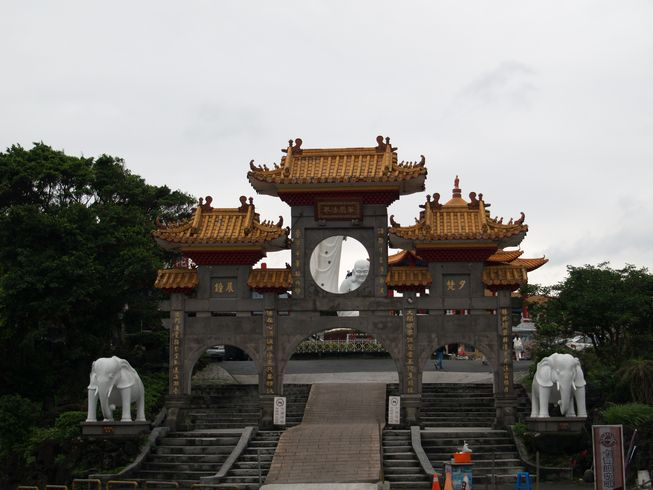
- Interactive map of Zhongzheng Park
- Location: Xinyi and Zhongzheng, Keelung City, Taiwan
- Coordinates: 25.133°N 121.750°E

The Zhongzheng Park (traditional Chinese: 中正公園; simplified Chinese: 中正公园; pinyin: Zhōngzhèng Gōngyuán) is a park located in Xinyi District and Zhongzheng District of Keelung City, Taiwan.

Zhongzheng Park traces its history to 1933 during the Japanese rule of Taiwan. It was built as Ishizaka Park by Sōsaku Ishizaka (石坂荘作), and he donated it to the government of then-Kiirun City.

The 25-meter statue of the goddess Guanyin on top of Zhongzheng Park is the biggest goddess statue in Southeast Asia and is one of the most scenic spots in Keelung city.

== See also ==
- Keelung City
