= Sankeng railway station =

Railway station in Ren'ai, Keelung, Taiwan

Sankeng Station 三坑車站
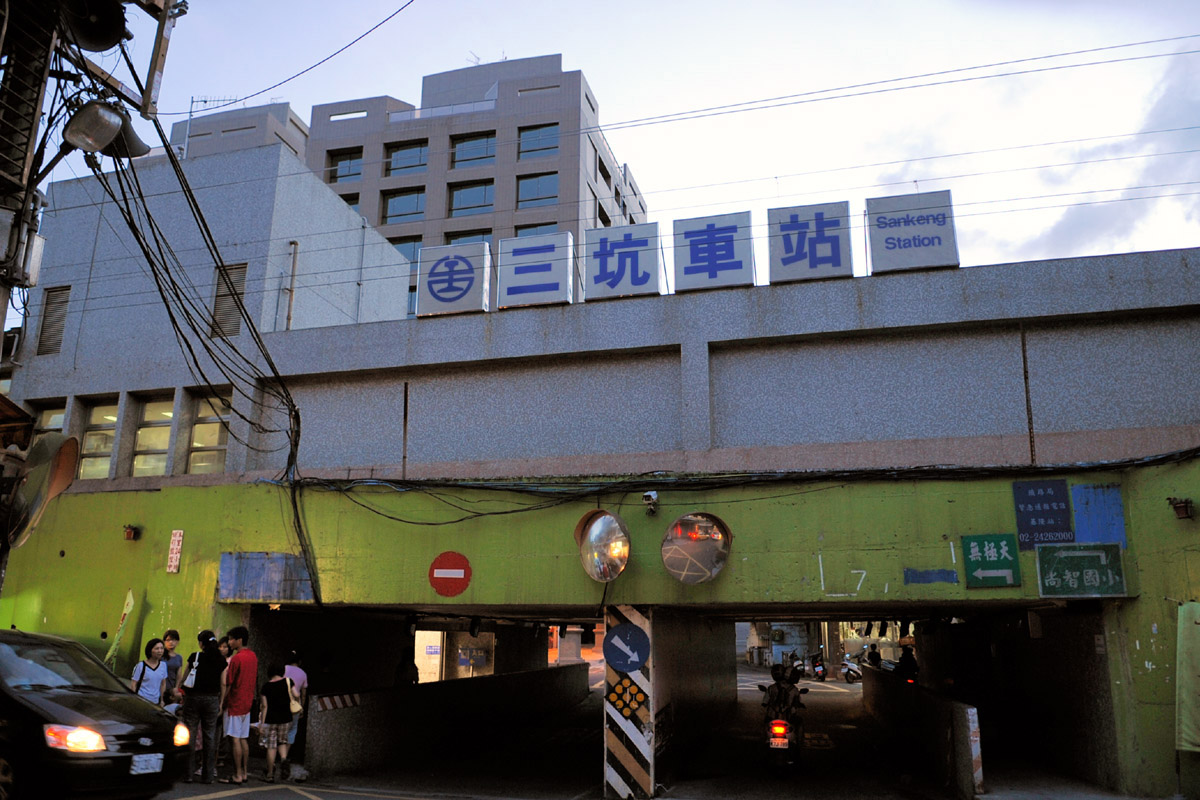

General information
- Location: Ren'ai, Keelung, Taiwan
- Coordinates: 25.123081°N 121.742°E
- System: Train station
- Owner: Taiwan Railway Corporation
- Operator: Taiwan Railway Corporation
- Line: Western Trunk line
- Platforms: 1 island
- Train operators: Taiwan Railway Corporation

Construction
- Structure type: Elevated

History
- Opened: 3 May 2009

Passengers
- 3,024 daily (2024)

Services
Preceding station	Taiwan Railway	Following station
Keelung Terminus	Western Trunk line	Badu towards Pingtung
Location

Sankeng (Chinese: 三坑車站; pinyin: Sānkēng Chēzhàn; Pe̍h-ōe-jī: Saⁿ-kheⁿ-á Chhia-chām) is a railway station on the Taiwan Railway West Coast line located in Ren'ai District, Keelung City, Taiwan.

== History ==
The station was opened on 3 May 2009, as a result of TRA's policy of transforming its railroad lines into an MRT-type railroad. The only train that stops at this station is the local train.

== Platform layout ==
1	1A	■ West Coast line (southbound departure)	Toward Qidu, Taipei, Taichung, Kaohsiung, Pingtung
2	1B	■ West Coast line (northbound departure)	Toward Keelung

== Around the station ==
- Keelung Miaokow Night Market (Chinese: 基隆廟口/廟口夜市)

== See also ==
- List of railway stations in Taiwan
