= Zhongshan District, Keelung =

District of Keelung, Taiwan

Coordinates: 25.151889°N 121.728588°E

Zhongshan 中山區 Jhongshan
- District
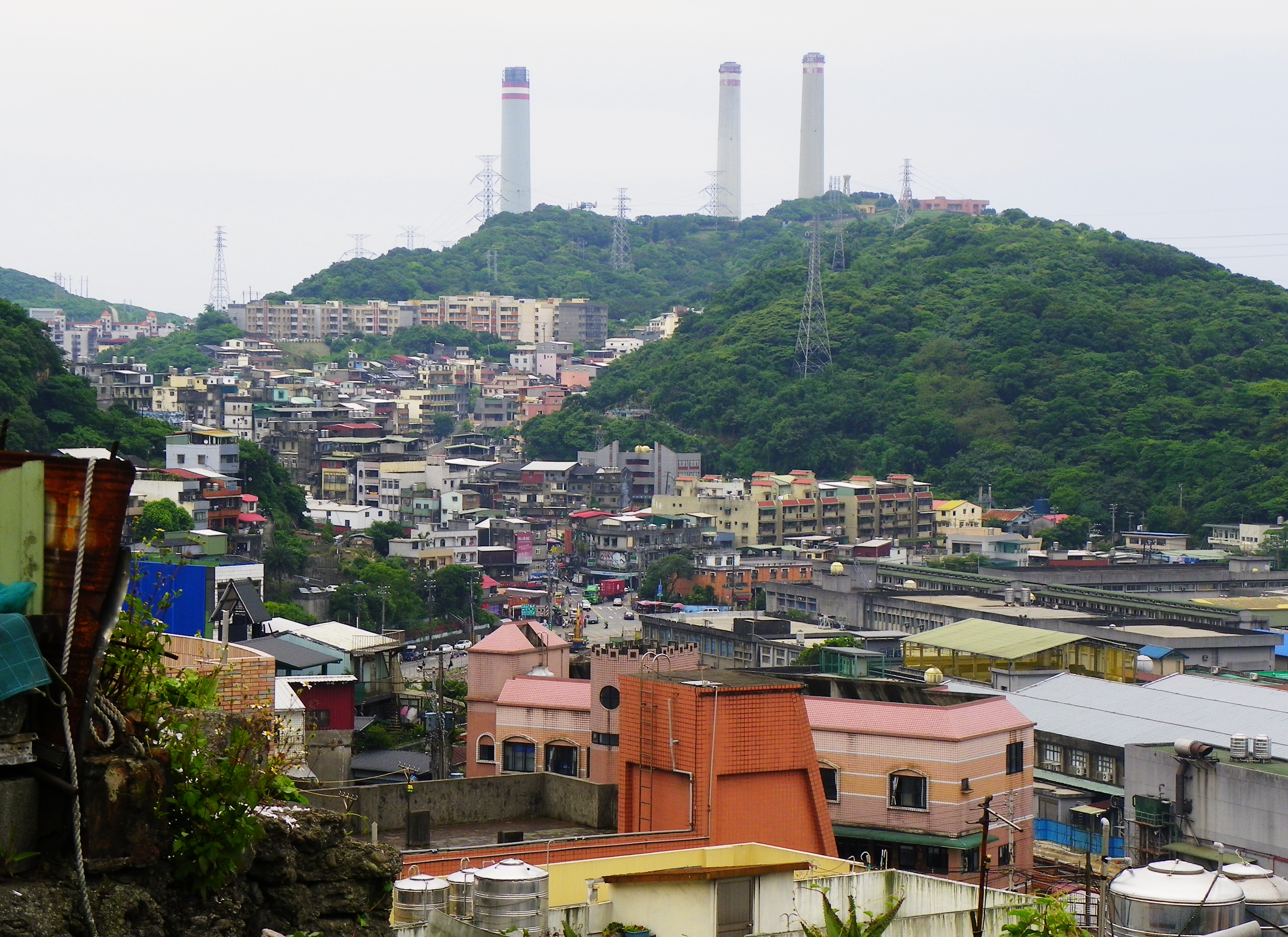

- Zhongshan District in Keelung City
- Location: Keelung, Taiwan
- Established: 1946
- Urban villages: 24

Government
  - Leader (區長): Chen Hsin-Hsiung (陳信雄)

Area
  - Total: 10.5238 km^{2} (4.0633 sq mi)

Population (October 2023)
  - Total: 45,523
  - Density: 4,325.7/km^{2} (11,204/sq mi)
- Time zone: UTC+8 (National Standard Time)
- Postal code: 203
- Website: www.kljs.klcg.gov.tw (in Chinese)

Zhongshan District (Chinese: 中山區; Hanyu Pinyin: Zhōngshān Qū; Tongyong Pinyin: Jhongshan Cyu; Pe̍h-ōe-jī: Tiong-san-khu) is a district in Keelung, Taiwan.

== Administrative divisions ==
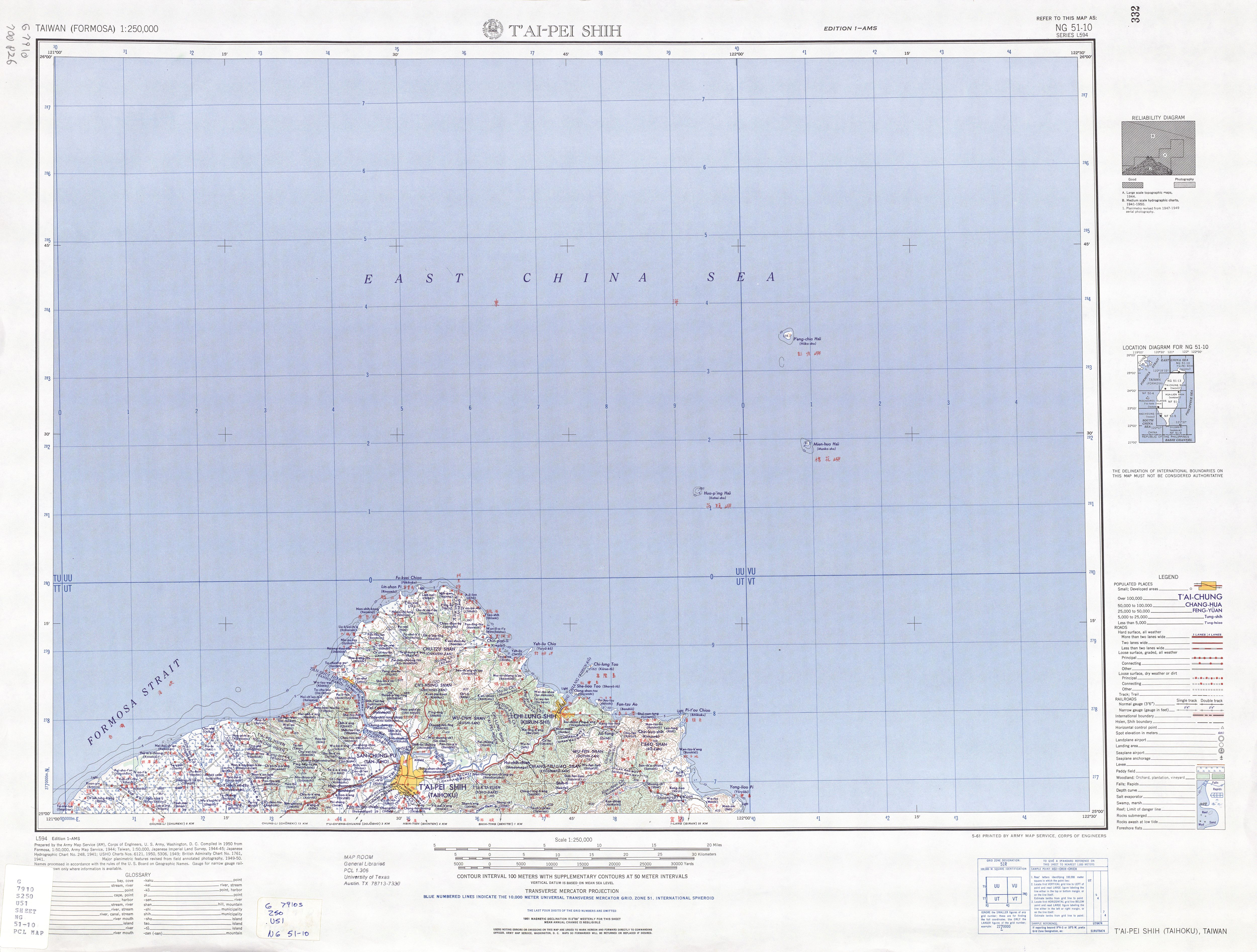
Area of today's Zhongshan District, Keelung (1950)

The district administers 24 urban villages:

- Xinjian/Sinjian (新建里), Anmin (安民里), Anping (安平里), Zhongshan/Jhongshan (中山里), Minzhi/Minjhih (民治里), Zhongxing/Jhongsing (中興里), Renzheng/Renjheng (仁正里), Jianmin (健民里), Tonghua (通化里), Juren/Jyuren (居仁里), Tongming (通明里), Xiehe/Siehe (協和里), Wenhua/Wunhua (文化里), Xiandong/Siandong (仙洞里), Taibai (太白里), Xirong/Sirong (西榮里), Xihua/Sihua (西華里), Xiding/Siding (西定里), Xikang/Sikang (西康里), Dehe (德和里), Zhonghe/Jhonghe (中和里), Dean/De-an/De'an (德安里), Heping (和平里), Heqing/Hecing (和慶里)

== Government ==
- Civil affairs division
- Social affairs division
- Economic construction division
- Military service division
- Mediation committee

== Education ==
- Ching Kuo Institute of Management and Health
- Keelung Fu Jen Sacred Heart Senior High School

== Tourist attractions ==
- Baimiweng Fort
- Cave of Buddha's Hand
- Huzishan Keelung Landmark
- Keelung Lighthouse
- Lake Coastal Boulevard
- Memorial for Labors Died during Keelung Port Construction
- Neimushan
- Quizishan Lighthouse
- Waimushan Seaside Scenic Area
- Waimushan Fishing Harbor
- Xian Dong Yan
- Shengann Temple

== Infrastructure ==
- Hsieh-ho Power Plant

== Transportation ==
The district is accessible from Keelung Station of Taiwan Railway.

Provincial Highways 2 and 2F (Which connects to Freeway 3), run through the district.

== See also ==
- Keelung
