= Embrace Cultural and Creative Park =

Cultural center in Xinyi, Keelung, Taiwan

- 擁恆文創園區
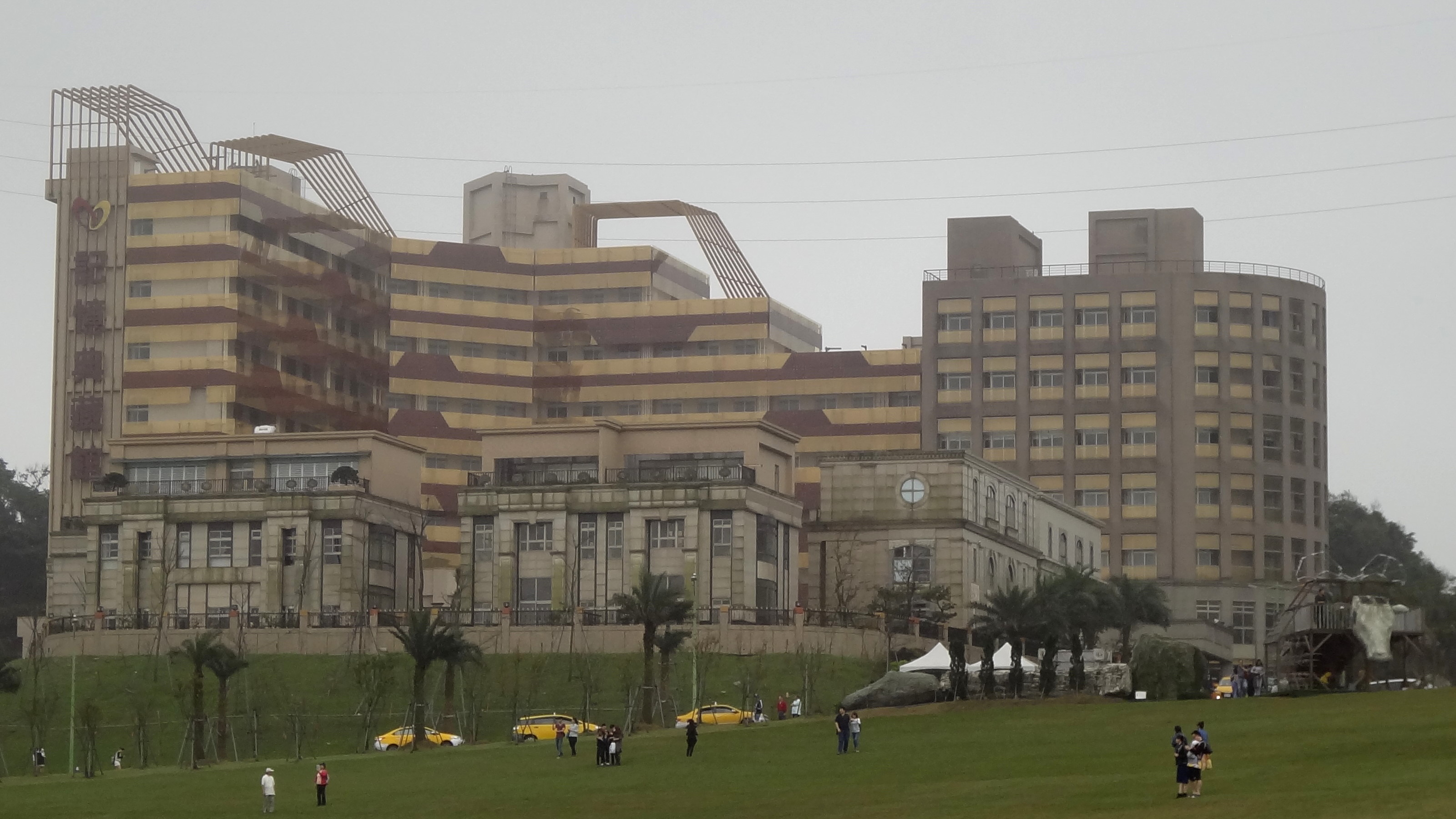
- Interactive map of the Embrace Cultural and Creative Park area

General information
- Type: cultural and creative park
- Location: Xinyi, Keelung, Taiwan
- Coordinates: 25°06′44.0″N 121°45′25.9″E

Website
- Official website (in Chinese)

The Embrace Cultural and Creative Park (traditional Chinese: 擁恆文創園區; simplified Chinese: 拥恒文创园区; pinyin: Yōnghéng Wénchuàng Yuánqū) is a multi-purpose park in Xinyi District, Keelung, Taiwan.

== Exhibitions ==
- The Starry Night

== See also ==
- List of tourist attractions in Taiwan
