= Crown Commercial Building =

Skyscraper office building in Sinyi District of Keelung, Taiwan

Crown Commercial Building 元邦皇冠商業大樓
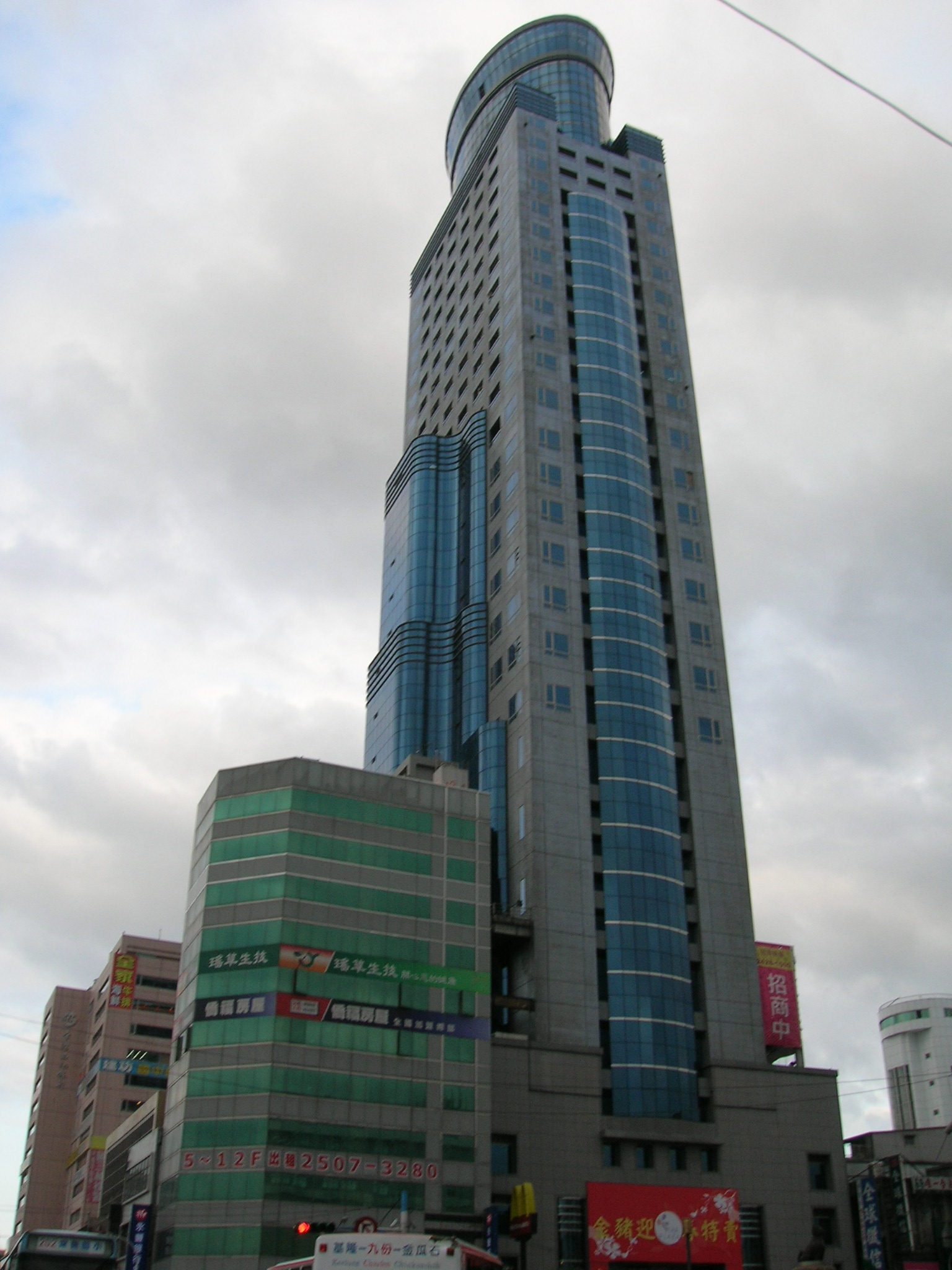

General information
- Type: Office
- Location: Xinyi District, Keelung, Taiwan
- Coordinates: 25°07′51″N 121°44′41″E
- Completed: 2000

Height
- Architectural: 148 m (486 ft)

Technical details
- Floor count: 33 above ground 7 below ground
- Floor area: 33,140.30 m^{2} (356,719.2 sq ft)

The Crown Commercial Building, also known as Hua Guan Tower (Chinese: 元邦皇冠商業大樓; pinyin: Yuánbāng huángguàn shāngyè dàlóu), is a skyscraper completed in 2000 in Xinyi District, Keelung, Taiwan. As of December 2020, it is the tallest building in Keelung. The height of the building is 148 m (486 ft), and it comprises 33 floors above ground, as well as seven basement levels. The first to sixth levels house MOYA Sparkle Shopping Mall (摩亞時尚廣場) and the 7th to 10th levels house Showtime Cinemas.

== See also ==
- List of tallest buildings in Asia
- List of tallest buildings in Taiwan
- Glory Tower
- Port City Pearl
