= Glory Tower =

Residential skyscraper in Ren-ai District of Keelung, Taiwan

Glory Tower 東方帝景大樓
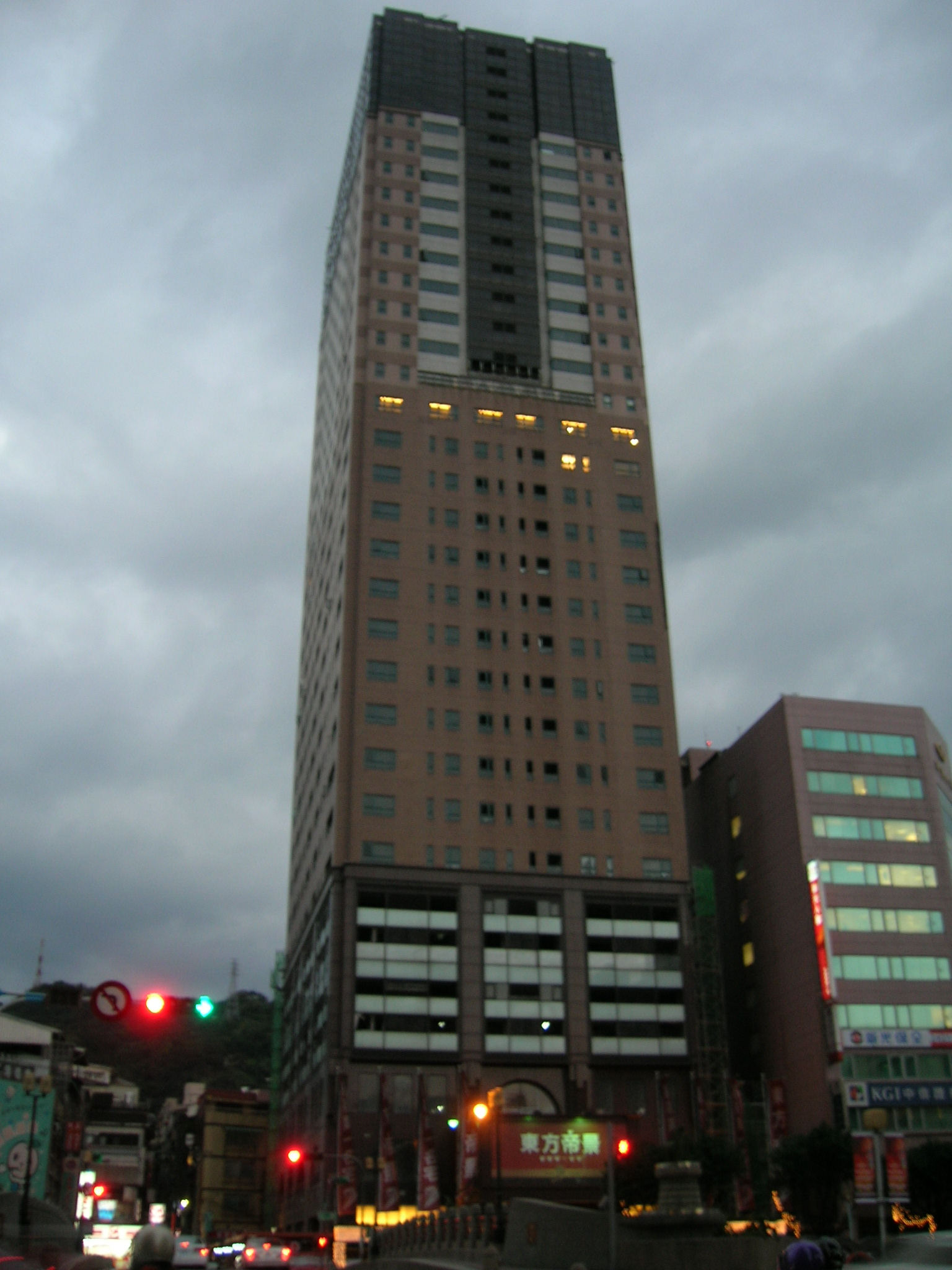
- Interactive map of the Glory Tower 東方帝景大樓 area

General information
- Status: Completed
- Type: Residential
- Location: No. 257, Renyi Road, Ren-ai District, Keelung, Taiwan
- Coordinates: 25°07′41″N 121°44′56″E
- Completed: 2007

Height
- Architectural: 128.28 m (420.9 ft)
- Roof: 117.3 m (385 ft)

Technical details
- Floor count: 31
- Floor area: 28,548 m^{2} (307,290 sq ft)

Design and construction
- Architect: Chu-Yuan Lee

The Glory Tower (Chinese: 東方帝景大樓; pinyin: Dōngfāng dì jǐng dàlóu) is a residential skyscraper located in Ren-ai District, Keelung, Taiwan. The height of the building is 128.28 m (420.9 ft), with a floor area of 28,548 m^{2} (307,290 sq ft), and it comprises 31 floors above ground, as well as five basement levels. The building was designed by Taiwanese architect Chu-Yuan Lee and was completed in 2007 and houses 271 apartment units. As of December 2020, it is the second tallest building in Keelung, after Lih-Rong An Imperial Crown Building.

== See also ==
- List of tallest buildings in Taiwan
- Lih-Rong An Imperial Crown Building
- Port City Pearl
