= Gongzi Liao Fort =

Former fort in Xinyi, Keelung, Taiwan

- 槓子寮砲台
- Xinyi, Keelung, Taiwan
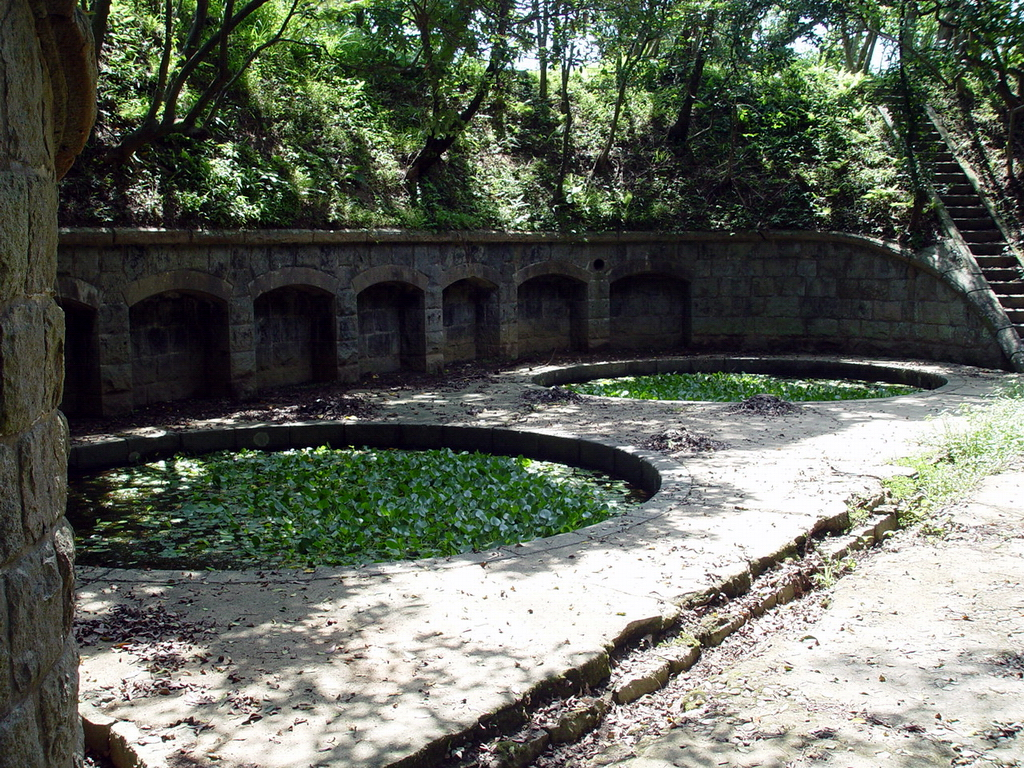

Site information
- Type: fort

Location
- Taiwan
- Coordinates: 25°08′40.3″N 121°46′48.9″E

Site history
- Built: 1904
- Built by: Imperial Japanese Army

The Gongzi Liao Fort (traditional Chinese: 槓子寮砲台; simplified Chinese: 杠子寮炮台; pinyin: Gàngzi Liáo Pàotái) is a former fort in Xinyi District, Keelung, Taiwan.

== History ==
The fort was built by the Japanese in 1904 after they landed in Keeling following the Treaty of Shimonoseki with Qing Dynasty. After the handover of Taiwan from Japan to the Republic of China in 1945, the fort was still used as a military facility and garrison was placed there.

== Architecture ==
The fort is divided into four areas, which are living area and barracks, warehouse, gun emplacement and observatory. The fort is also equipped with facilities such as lookout posts, barricades, command stations, blockhouses, tunnels, ammunition depots, water reservoir etc.

== See also ==
- List of tourist attractions in Taiwan
