= Baimiweng Fort =

Former fort in Zhongzheng, Keelung, Taiwan

- 白米甕砲台
- Zhongzheng, Keelung, Taiwan
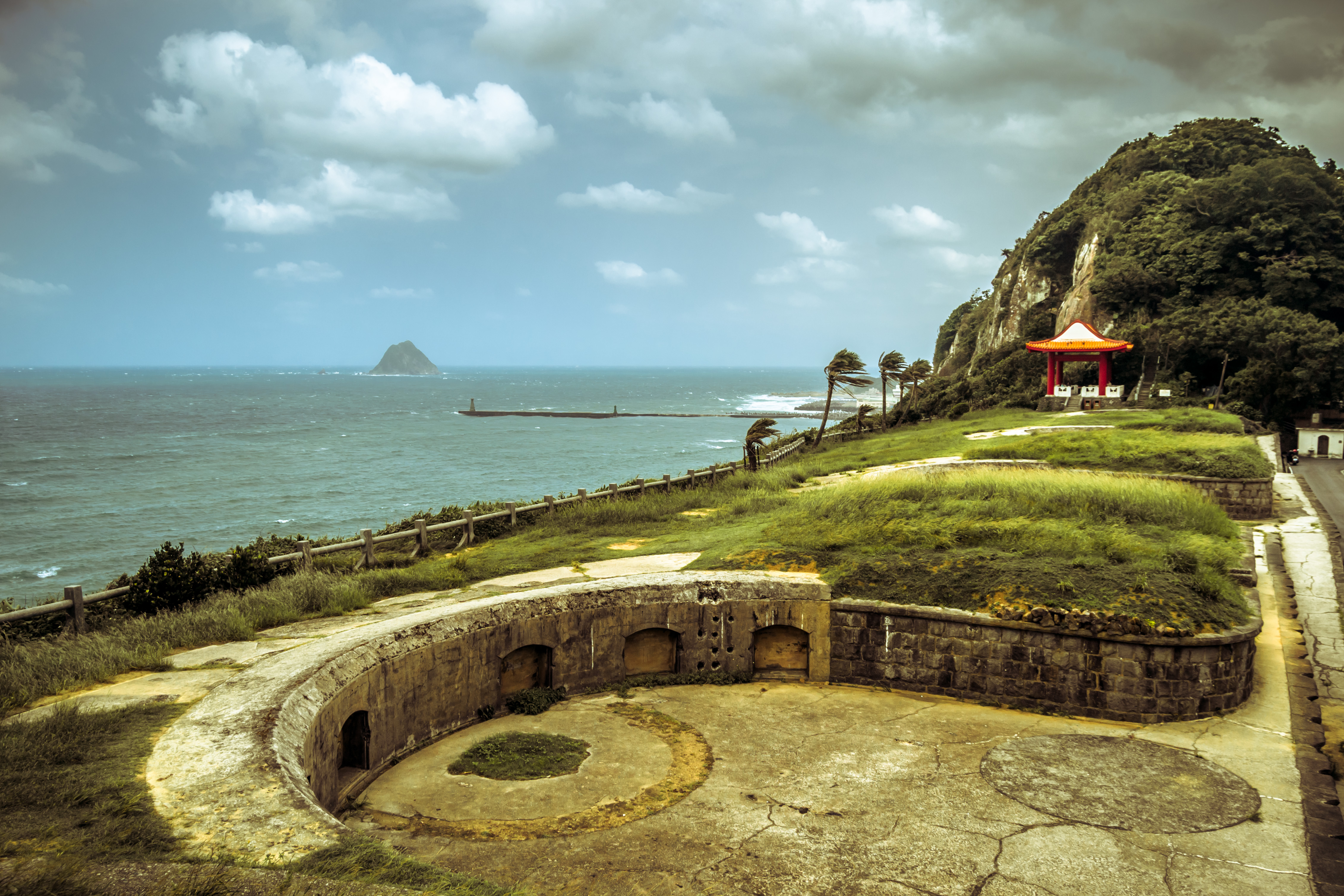

Site information
- Type: fort

Location
- Taiwan
- Coordinates: 25°09′20.0″N 121°44′35.2″E

Site history
- Battles/wars: Sino-French War

The Baimiweng Fort (traditional Chinese: 白米甕砲台; simplified Chinese: 白米瓮炮台; pinyin: Báimǐwèng Pàotái), also known as Holland Castle or Gun Emplacement of Fort Holland, is a former fort in Zhongshan District, Keelung, Taiwan.

== History ==
The fort was probably constructed during the Dutch Formosa and Spanish Formosa period. It was once occupied by the French Third Republic army during the Sino-French War. The Japanese government remodeled the fort to become as what it is today. In September 2016, the Keelung City Government announced a plan to restore and preserve the fort under the subsidy of the Ministry of Culture.

== Architecture ==
The sea facing fort shape has a rectangle shape. It has three sections, which are Barbette, control center and observation station.

== See also ==
- List of tourist attractions in Taiwan
