= YM Oceanic Culture and Art Museum =

Museum in Ren'ai, Keelung, Taiwan

- 陽明海洋文化藝術館
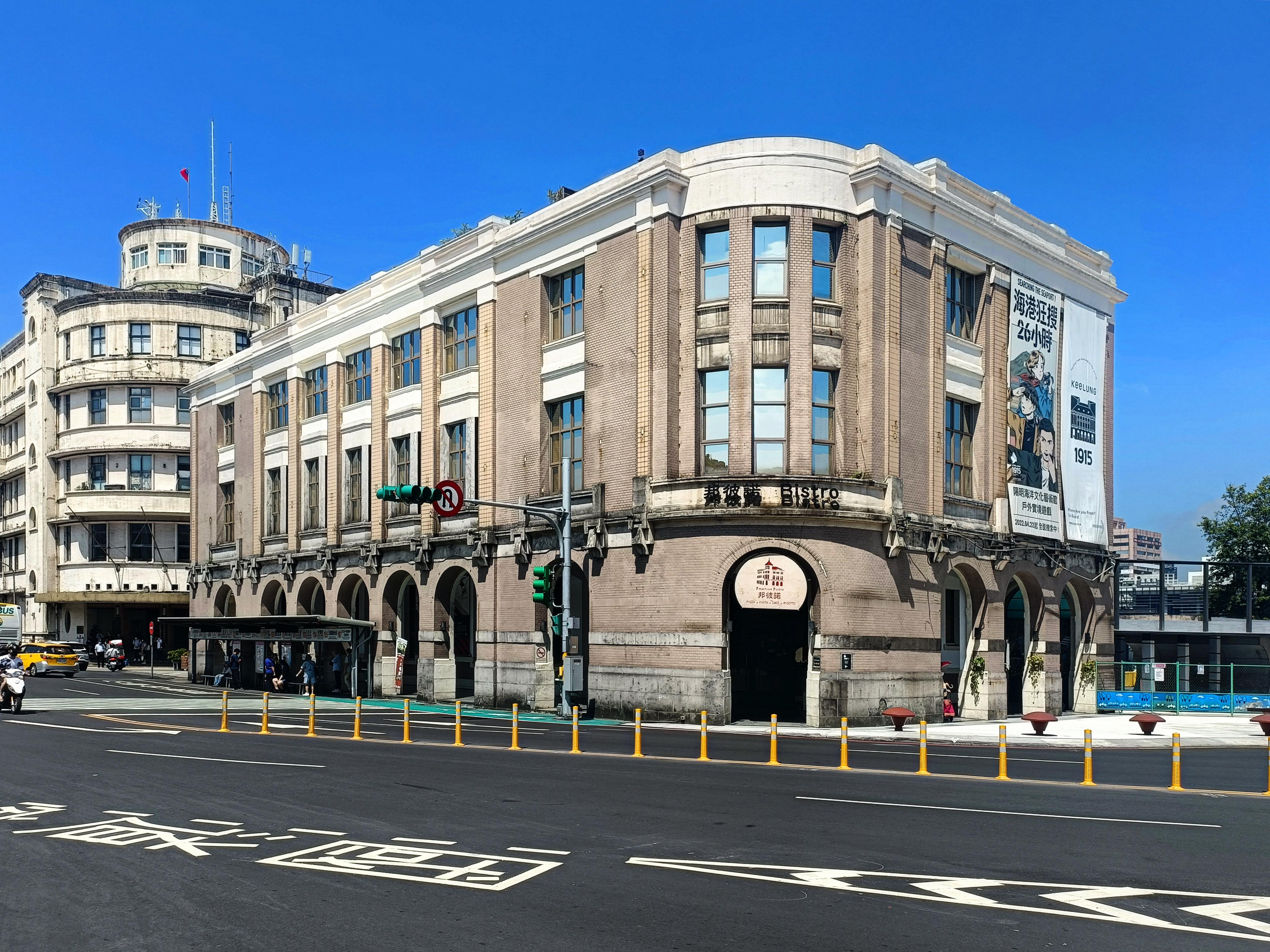
- Established: 28 December 2004
- Location: Ren'ai, Keelung, Taiwan
- Coordinates: 25°07′57″N 121°44′24″E
- Type: museum
- Architects: Kanosuke Moriyama; Kaori Ide
- Owner: China Merchants Bureau
- Website: Official website

The YM Oceanic Culture and Art Museum (traditional Chinese: 陽明海洋文化藝術館; simplified Chinese: 阳明海洋文化艺术馆; pinyin: Yángmíng Hǎiyáng Wénhuà Yìshùguǎn) or Yang Ming Oceanic Culture and Art Museum (OCAM) is a museum about oceanic culture and art in Ren'ai District, Keelung, Taiwan.

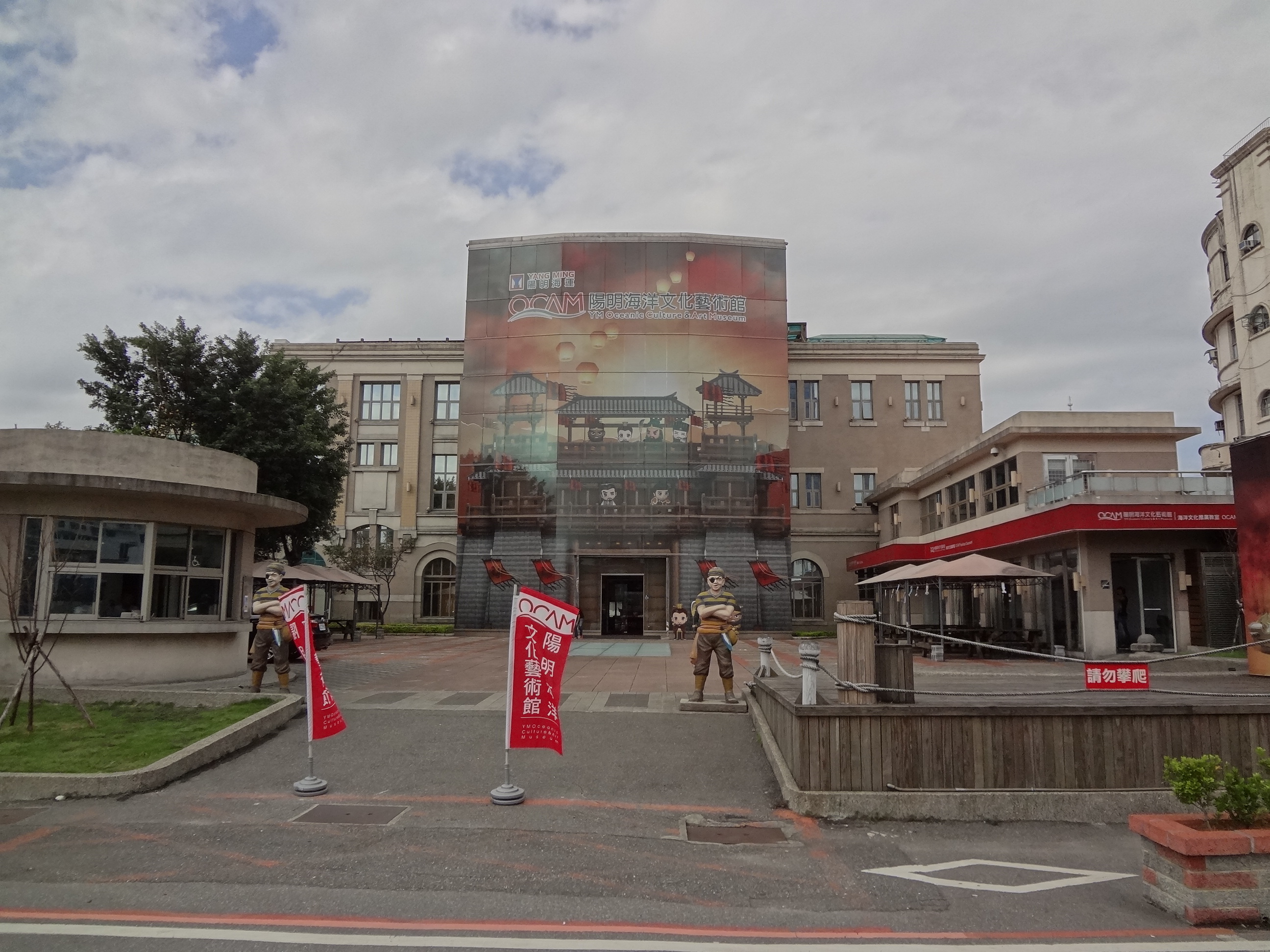
The entrance of YM Oceanic Culture and Art Museum.

== History ==
The museum building was originally constructed in 1915 during the Japanese rule of Taiwan as the property of Nippon Yusen. After the handover of Taiwan to China in 1945, the building was taken over by the China Merchants Bureau. The building was renovated in 2003 and opened as the YM Oceanic Culture and Art Museum in 2004.

== Transportation ==
The museum is accessible from Keelung Station of the Taiwan Railway.

== See also ==
- List of museums in Taiwan
- YM Museum of Marine Exploration Kaohsiung
- Yang Ming Marine Transport Corporation
- Maritime industries of Taiwan
