= Port City Pearl =

Residential skyscraper in Keelung, Taiwan

Port City Pearl 港都明珠
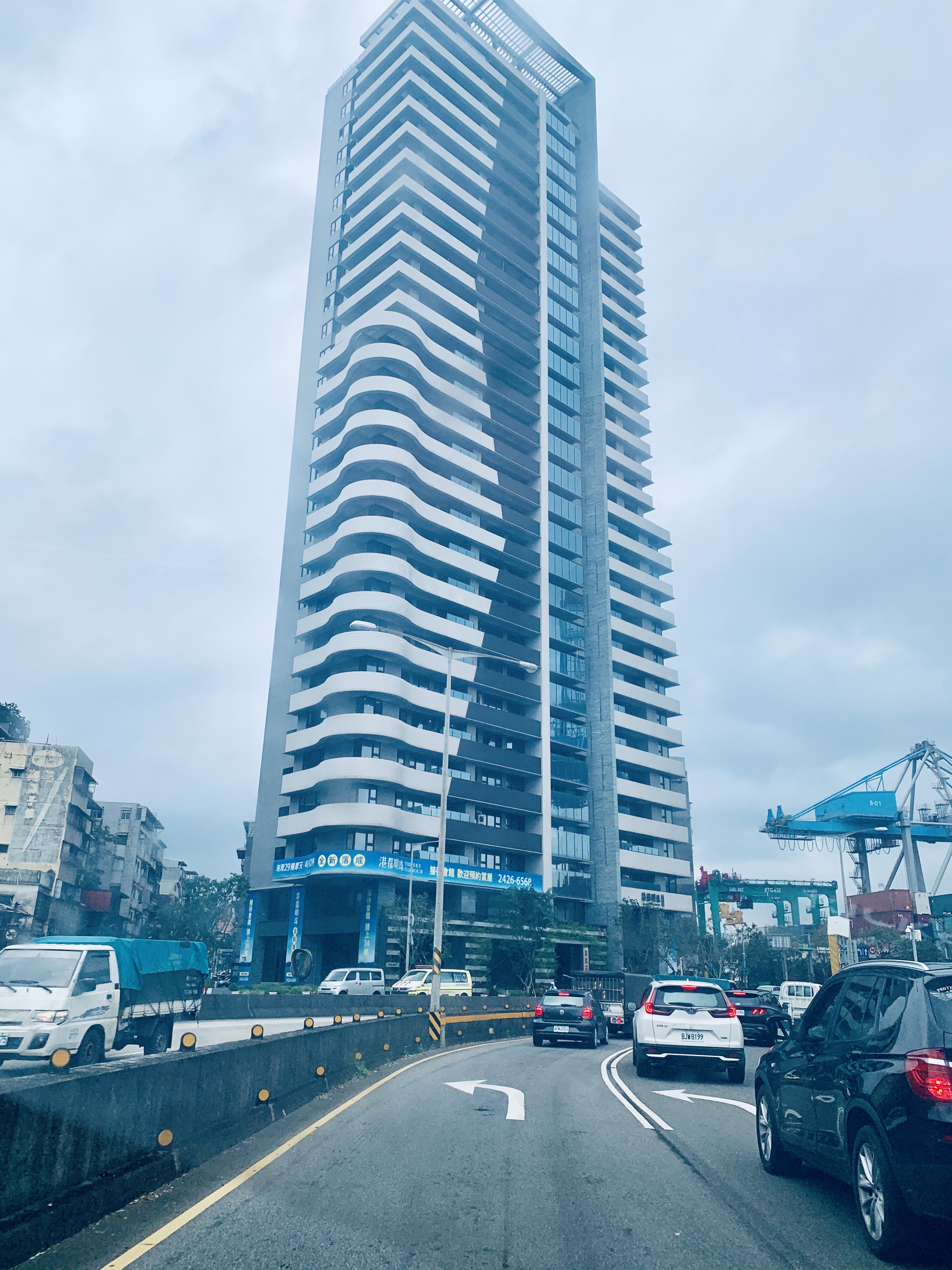
- Interactive map of the Port City Pearl 港都明珠 area

General information
- Status: Completed
- Type: Residential
- Location: No. 166-1, Zhongzheng Road, Zhongzheng District, Keelung, Taiwan
- Coordinates: 25°8′22″N 121°45′11″E
- Construction started: 28 April 2019
- Completed: 2023

Height
- Architectural: 108.65 m (356.5 ft)

Technical details
- Floor count: 29 above ground 4 below ground
- Floor area: 21,981.40 m^{2} (236,605.8 sq ft)

The Port City Pearl (Chinese: 港都明珠; pinyin: Gǎng Dū Míng Zhū) is a 29-storey, 108.65 m (356.5 ft) tall residential skyscraper located in Zhongzheng District, Keelung, Taiwan. Construction of the building started on 28 April 2019, and it was completed in 2023. As of November 2024, it is the third tallest building in Keelung, after Lih-Rong An Imperial Crown Building and Glory Tower.

== See also ==
- List of tallest buildings in Taiwan
