= Keelung railway station =

Railway station in Ren'ai, Keelung, Taiwan

Keelung 基隆
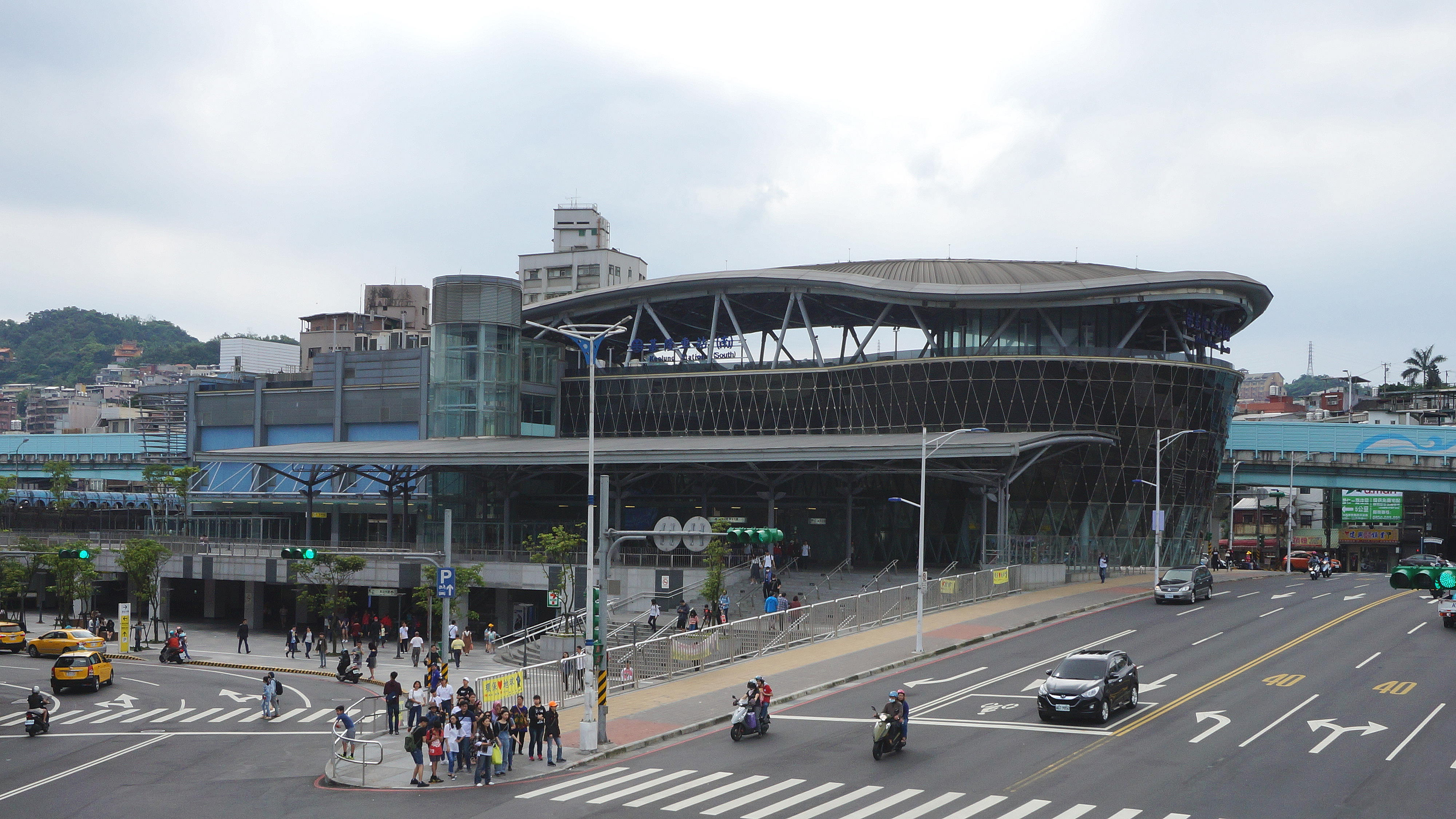

Chinese name
- Traditional Chinese: 基隆
Transcriptions
Standard Mandarin
- Hanyu Pinyin: Jīlóng
- Bopomofo: ㄐㄧ ㄌㄨㄥˊ

General information
- Location: 5 Gangxi Street; Ren'ai, Keelung; Taiwan
- Coordinates: 25.1316°N 121.7384°E
- System: TRA railway station
- Line: Western Trunk line
- Distance: 0.0 km to Keelung
- Platforms: 2 bay platforms
- Tracks: 4
- Connections: Local bus; Coach

Construction
- Structure type: Underground

Other information
- Station code: 0900
- Classification: First class (Chinese: 一等)

History
- Opened: 20 October 1891; 134 years ago
- Rebuilt: 29 June 2015; 11 years ago
- Electrified: 9 January 1978; 48 years ago

Key dates
- 1899: Rebuilt
- 1908: Rebuilt
- March 1965: Rebuilt

Passengers
- 1,295,466 daily (2024)

Services
Preceding station	Taiwan Railway	Following station
Terminus	Western Trunk line	Sankeng towards Pingtung
Location
- Location within Taiwan

Keelung Station (Chinese: 基隆車站; pinyin: Jīlóng chēzhàn) is a railway station in Ren'ai District, Keelung, Taiwan served by Taiwan Railway. It was built in 1891, and has gone through several renovations.

== Overview ==
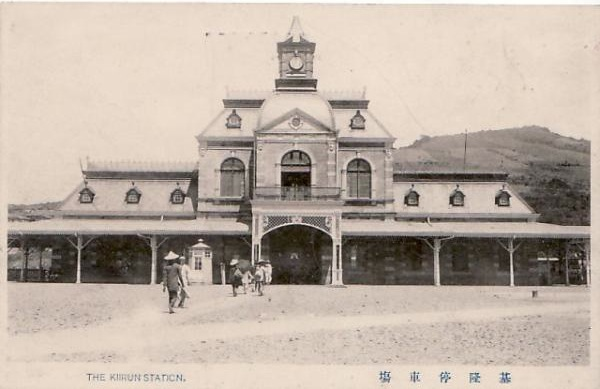
The third-generation Keelung Station, opened in 1908

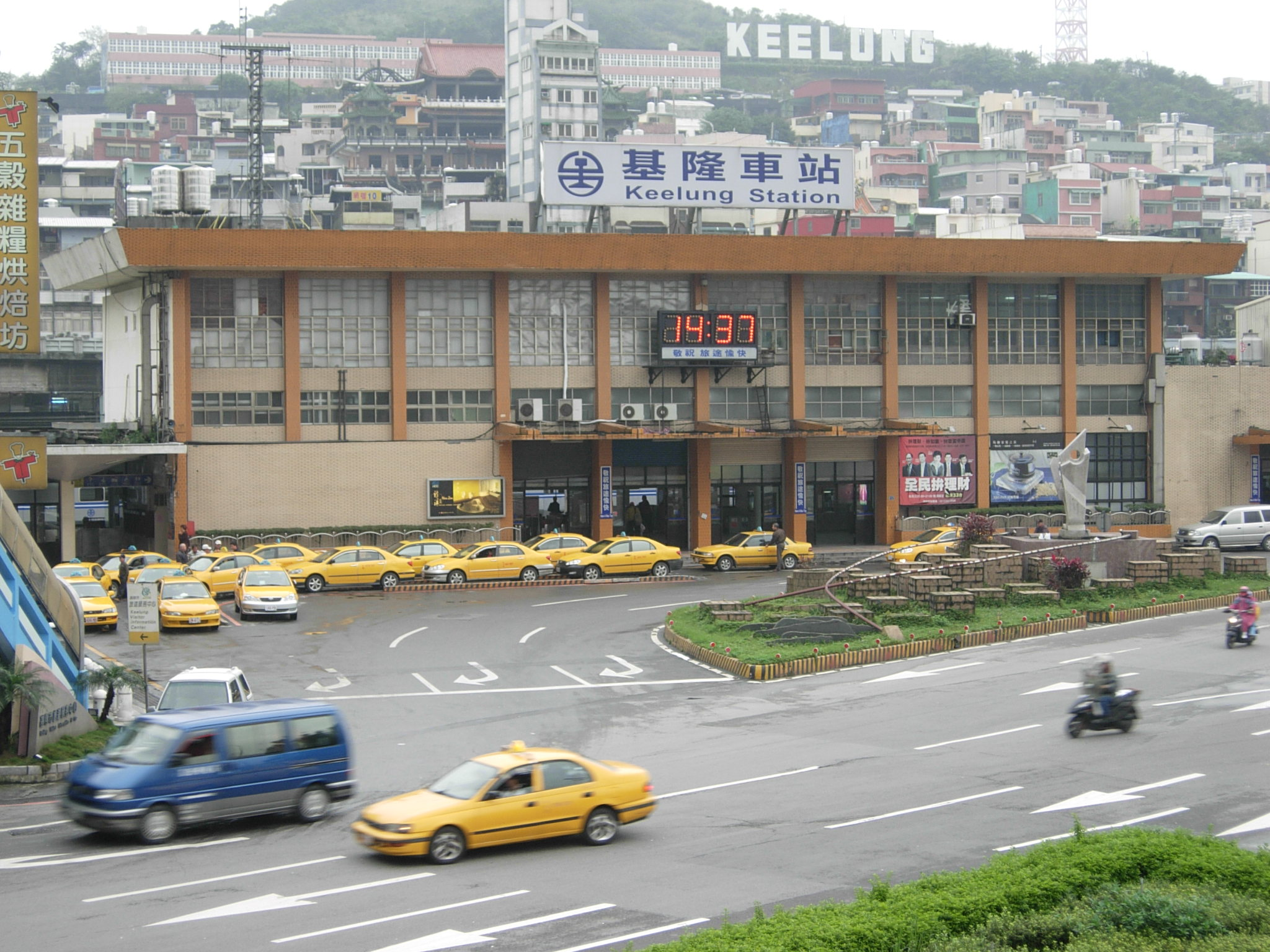
The fourth-generation Keelung station, January 2007

The station has three stories (two aboveground, one underground).

== Platform layout ==
1; 2; 3; 4	1A; 1B; 2A; 2B	■ West Coast line (southbound departure)	Toward Qidu, Taipei, Taichung, Kaohsiung, Pingtung

== History ==
- 20 October 1891: A station to the north of the current station was opened (Keelung Train Pier, Chinese: 雞籠火車碼頭) when the railroad segment from Keelung to Tsui-tng-ka Pier was completed.
- 20 October 1893: The rail line from Keelung to Taipeh (Taipei) was completed.
- 30 October 1908: The third-generation station (with clock tower) was opened for service. The style is similar to Hsinchu and Taichung stations, which opened at around the same time.
- April 1914: The rail line from Keelung to Haccho was completed.
- 23 January 1967: The fourth-generation station was completed.
- 1968: Station underpass was completed.
- 5 April 1968: The Keelung Railway Restaurant was added to the station.
- 6 June 1985: The aforementioned restaurant closed.
- 8 June 2013: One of the station's footbridges collapsed, injuring one woman and delaying the train schedule.
- 29 June 2015: The current (fifth-generation) station was completed, at a new location to the south of Zhong 1st Road. The NT$2.6 billion project included 1.5 km (0.93 mi) of track, including the route to Sankeng Station, and the elimination of two level crossings. The previous station will be converted into an art exhibition venue.

== Around the station ==
- Keelung City Government
- Keelung City Council
- Keelung Civic Plaza
- Keelung City Tourism Center
- Keelung Station Circle
- Keelung Transfer Station
- YM Oceanic Culture and Art Museum
- Keelung Cultural Center
- Keelung Fort Commander's Official Residence
- Huzishan Keelung Landmark
- Keelung Night Market
- Renai Market
- Kanziding Fish Market
- Keelung East Coast Shopping Mall (基隆東岸商場)
- Port of Keelung
  - Keelung Maritime Plaza
  - Keelung Harbor Building
  - Border Square (國門廣場)
  - West Passenger Terminal
  - West coast ports and storage
- Zhong 1st Road Harbor Trail
- Hsieh-ho Power Plant

== See also ==
- List of railway and metro stations in Taiwan
