= Hsieh-ho Power Plant =

Power station in Zhongshan, Keelung, Taiwan

Hsieh-ho Power Plant 協和發電廠
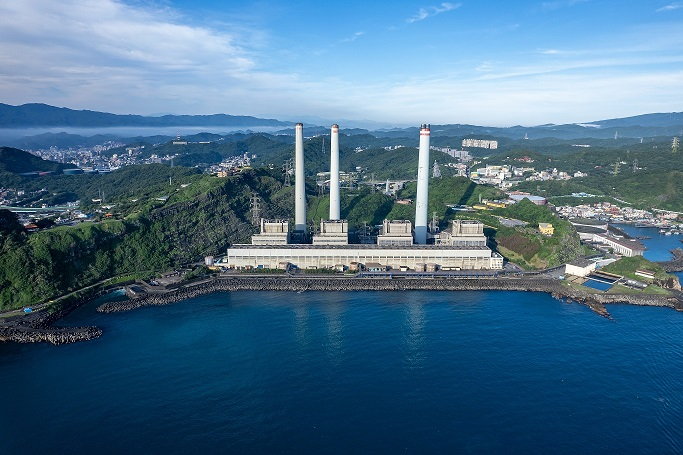
- Country: Republic of China
- Location: Zhongshan, Keelung, Taiwan Province
- Coordinates: 25°9′26.38″N 121°44′21.57″E
- Status: Operational
- Construction began: 1972
- Commission date: January 1977 (Unit 1); December 1977 (Unit 2); March 1980 (Unit 3); 1985 (Unit 4)
- Owner: Taipower
- Operator: Taipower

Thermal power station
- Primary fuel: Oil

Power generation
- Units operational: 2 X 500 MW
- Nameplate capacity: 1,000 MW

External links
- Commons: Related media on Commons

The Hsieh-ho Power Plant (traditional Chinese: 協和發電廠; simplified Chinese: 协和发电厂; pinyin: Xiéhé Fādiànchǎng) is an oil-fired power plant in Zhongshan District, Keelung, Taiwan. The power plant is the only fully oil-fired power plant in Taiwan.

== History ==
The construction of the power plant began in 1972. The power plant started its operation after the commissioning of its first generation unit in January 1977.

== Generation units ==
The power plant consists of four 500-MW generation units. The third 500-MW unit was finished on 19 December 1979 after a record-breaking construction period of 26 months. It went into operation in March 1980. The fourth 500-MW unit was completed in 1985 after 29 months construction period.

The units 1 and 2 were decommissioned on Dec. 31, 2019.

== Components ==
The steam generator is rated at 1,701 tonne/hour, 176 kg/cm^{2} and 542 °C at superheater outlet and reheat to 542 °C.

The steam turbine is a tandem-compound with four flow exhaust, 3,600 rpm single reheat with throttle steam conditions of 166 kg/cm^{2}, 538 °C with reheat to 538 °C.

The stacks are 200 meters high slip-form reinforced concrete stack.

== Transportation ==
Hsieh-ho Power Plant is accessible North from Keelung Station of Taiwan Railway.

== See also ==
- List of power stations in Taiwan
- Electricity sector in Taiwan
