= YM Museum of Marine Exploration Kaohsiung =

Museum in Cijin, Kaohsiung, Taiwan

- 陽明高雄海洋探索館
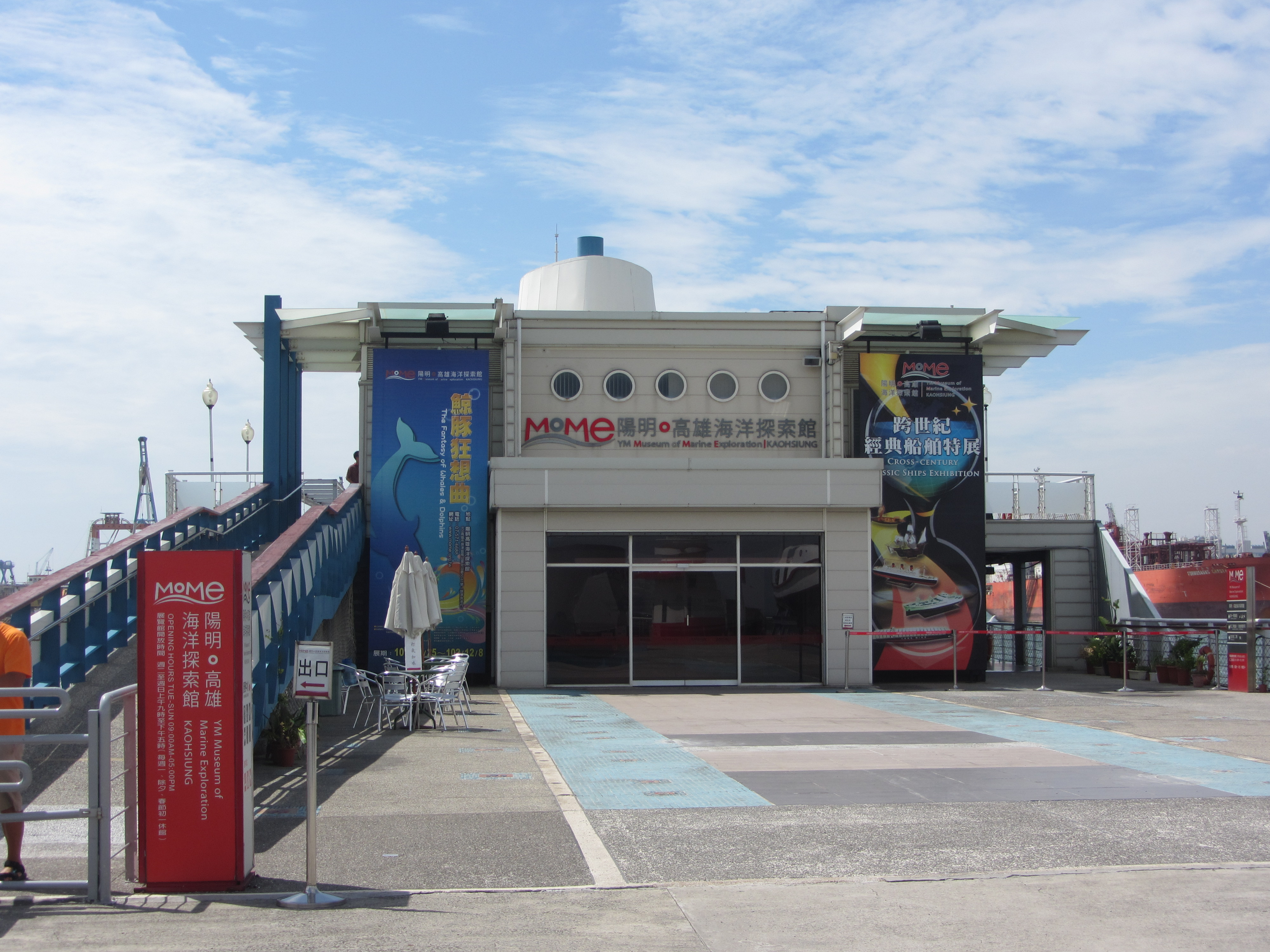
- Established: 28 December 2007; 18 years ago
- Location: Cijin, Kaohsiung, Taiwan
- Coordinates: 22°35′27″N 120°17′23″E
- Type: museum
- Owner: Yang Ming Marine Transport Corporation

The YM Museum of Marine Exploration Kaohsiung (MOME; traditional Chinese: 陽明高雄海洋探索館; simplified Chinese: 阳明高雄海洋探索馆; pinyin: Yángmíng Gāoxióng Hǎiyáng Tànsuǒguǎn) is a museum about marine exploration in Cijin District, Kaohsiung, Taiwan.

== History ==
After its rental tenure was approved by the Marine Bureau of the Kaohsiung City Government on 18 January 2007, Yang Ming Marine Transport Corporation established the Museum of Marine Exploration in Cijin Harbor, Kaohsiung. After refurbishment, the museum was officially opened on 28 December 2007 as the YM Museum of Marine Exploration Kaohsiung. Due to Yang Ming Marine Transport Corporation's strategy, it is closed in December, 2019.。

== Architecture ==
The museum is a two-storey building shaped like an ocean liner. Its boat-shaped structure appears as a large ship docked along Kaohsiung Harbor.

== Facilities ==
The museum has the following areas for exhibitions, etc.

First floor

- Two exhibition halls
- 3D animation cinema
- Multi-function conference room

Second floor

- Two open air areas for café and performance area
- Viewing platform

== See also ==
- List of museums in Taiwan
- YM Oceanic Culture and Art Museum
- Yang Ming Marine Transport Corporation
- Maritime industries of Taiwan
