= Xinyi District, Keelung =

District of Keelung, Taiwan

Coordinates: 25.128579°N 121.773477°E

Xinyi 信義區 Sin-Yi, Sinyi
- District
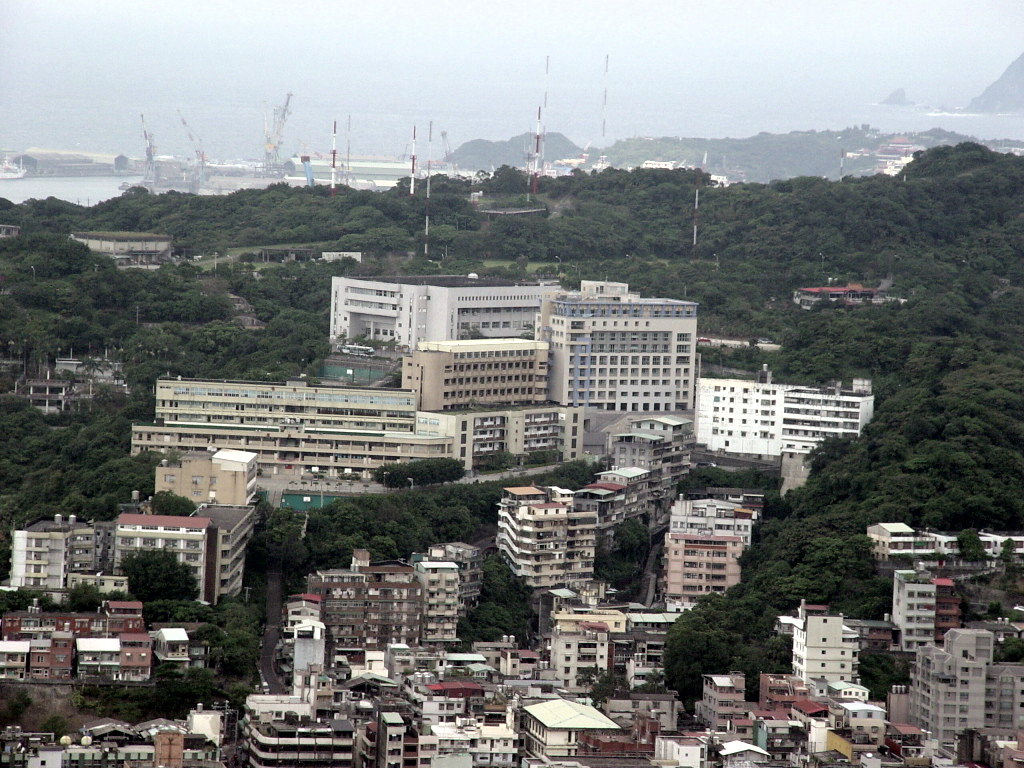

- Xinyi District in Keelung City
- Location: Keelung, Taiwan
- Urban villages: 20

Government
  - Leader (區長): Wu Ko-Wei (吳國偉)

Area
  - Total: 11 km^{2} (4.2 sq mi)

Population (October 2023)
  - Total: 53,399
  - Density: 4,900/km^{2} (13,000/sq mi)
- Time zone: UTC+8 (National Standard Time)
- Postal code: 201
- Website: www.klsy.klcg.gov.tw (in Chinese)

Xinyi District or Sinyi District (Chinese: 信義區; Hanyu Pinyin: Xìnyì Qū; Tongyong Pinyin: Sìnyì Cyu; Pe̍h-ōe-jī: Sìn-gī-khu) is a district of the city of Keelung, Taiwan.

== Administrative divisions ==
The district administers 20 urban villages:

- Renshou (仁壽里), Renyi (仁義里), Yizhao/Yijhao (義昭里), Yixing/Yising (義幸里), Yimin (義民里), Yihe (義和里), Zhihui/Jhihhuei (智慧里), Zhicheng/Jhihcheng (智誠里), Liyi (禮儀里), Lidong/Litung (禮東里), Xinlu/Xinlv/Sinlyu (信綠里), Dongxin/Dongsin/Tungxin (東信里), Dongguang/Tungguang (東光里), Dongming/Tungming (東明里), Dong-an/Dong'an/Tungan (東安里), Xiaoxian/Siaosian (孝賢里), Xiaozhong (孝忠里), Xiaode/Siaode (孝德里), Xiaoshen/Siaoshen (孝深里) and Xiaogang/Siaogang (孝岡里) Village.

== Government institutions ==
- Keelung City Council

== Education ==
- Chungyu University of Film and Arts

== Tourist attractions ==
- Zhongzheng Park
- Embrace Cultural and Creative Park
- Gongzi Liao Fort
- Military Park
