= Ren-ai District =

District of Keelung, Taiwan

Coordinates: 25.120341°N 121.743179°E

Ren-ai 仁愛區
- District
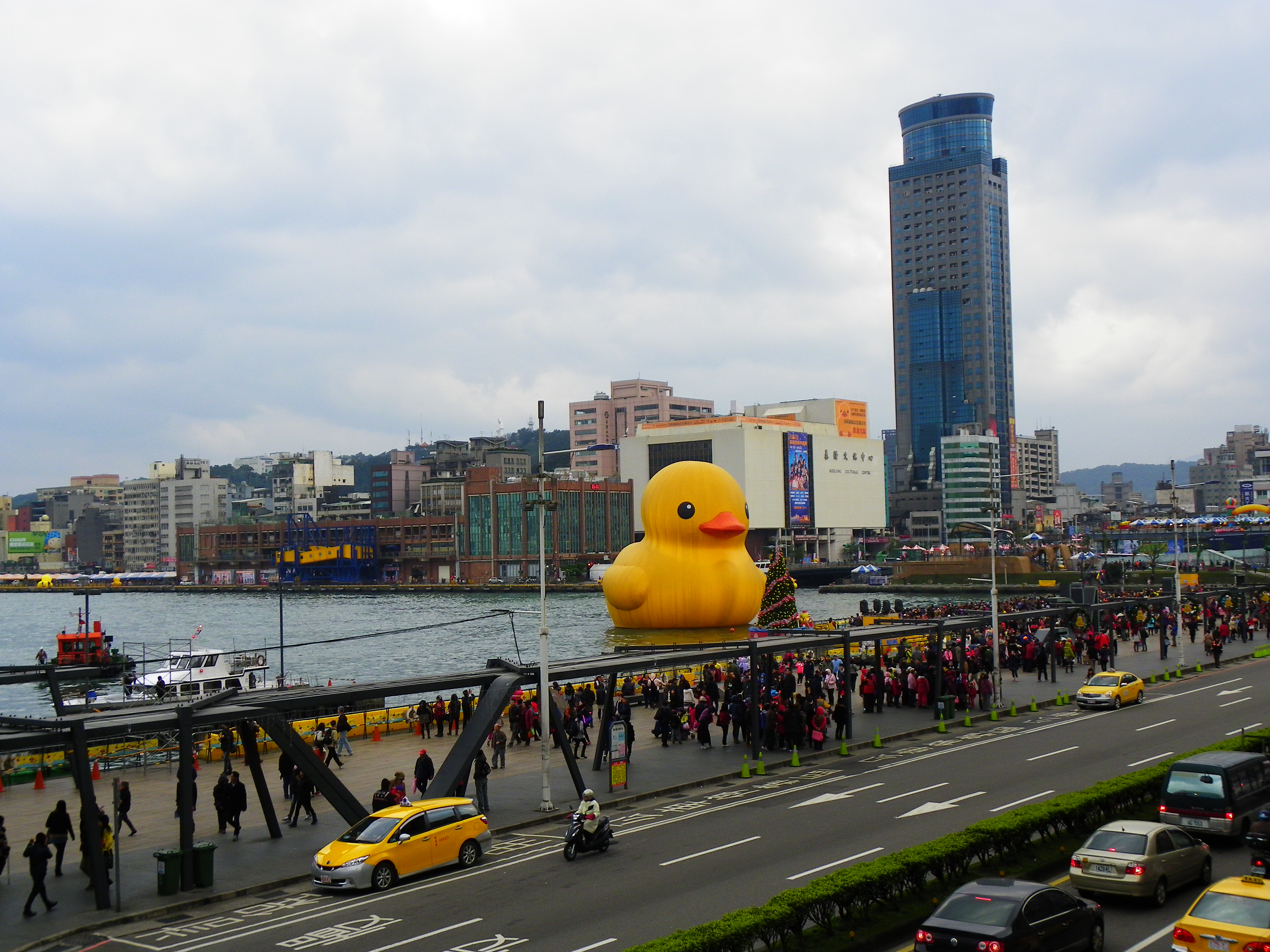

- 基隆市仁愛區公所; Ren-ai District Office, Keelung City

- Ren-ai District in Keelung City
- Location: Keelung, Taiwan
- Urban villages: 29

Government
  - Leader (區長): Lin Wen-chen (林文琛)

Area
  - Total: 4.2335 km^{2} (1.6346 sq mi)

Population (October 2023)
  - Total: 41,159
  - Density: 9,722.2/km^{2} (25,180/sq mi)
- Time zone: UTC+8 (National Standard Time)
- Postal code: 200
- Website: www.klra.klcg.gov.tw (in Chinese)

Ren-ai District (alternately Ren'ai) (Chinese: 仁愛區; pinyin: Rén'ài Qū; Pe̍h-ōe-jī: Jîn-ài-khu) is a district of the city of Keelung, Taiwan. It is the smallest district of Keelung City.

== Administrative divisions ==
The district administers 29 urban villages:

- Linquan/Lincyuan (林泉里), Huagang (花崗里), Hongqiao/Hongciao (虹橋里), Shuijin/Shueijin (水錦里), Zhiren/Jhihren (智仁里), Heming (和明里), Zhongyong/Jhongyong (忠勇里), Yutian (玉田里), Rende (仁德里), Boai/Bo-ai/Bo'ai (博愛里), Furen (福仁里), Chengren (誠仁里), Jiren (吉仁里), Yuren (育仁里), Yingren (英仁里), Longmen (龍門里), Dehou (德厚里), Qushui/Cyushuei (曲水里), Chongwen/Chongwun (崇文里), Wenan/Wen'an/Wun-an (文安里), Zhaolian/Jhaolian (兆連里), Shiqiu/Shihciou (獅球里), Shuyuan (書院里), Zhaodong/Jhaodong (朝棟里), Mingde (明德里), Tongfeng/Tongfong (同風里), Wenchang/Wunchang (文昌里), Xindian/Sindian (新店里) and Guanghua (光華里) Village.

== Tourist attractions ==
- Chingan Temple
- Miaokou Night Market
- Mount Hungtan
- Peace Square
- Shihchiuling Battery
- Tienchi Temple
- YM Oceanic Culture and Art Museum

== Transportation ==
The district is accessible from Keelung Station and Sankeng Station of Taiwan Railway.

== Notable natives ==
- Lin Yu-chang, Mayor of Keelung City

== See also ==
- Keelung City Government
