= Battle of Keelung =

Battle of Keelung may refer to:

- Keelung Campaign (1884–1885)
- Battle of Keelung (1895)
