= Battle of Keelung (1895) =

- Part of Japanese invasion of Taiwan (1895)
Date	2–3 June 1895
Location	Keelung, Taiwan
Result	Japanese victory

Belligerents
Empire of Japan	Republic of Formosa

Commanders and leaders
Prince Kitashirakawa Yoshihisa	Tang Jingsong

Strength
7,000 infantry and 5 warships	12,000 infantry

Casualties and losses
3 killed, 26 wounded	200 killed

The Battle of Keelung was the first significant engagement of the Japanese invasion of Taiwan (1895) on 2–3 June 1895 when the short-lived Republic of Formosa sought to repel the Japanese military forces sent there to occupy the ceded territories, by China's Qing dynasty, of the Taiwan and the Pescadores Islands to Japan under the April 1895 Treaty of Shimonoseki. The treaty was the result of China's defeat in the First Sino-Japanese War.

== Background ==
Qing notables on Taiwan disagreed with the concession of territory to Japan as stipulated by the treaty negotiated by the mainland. They vowed to resist raping Japanese occupation and proclaimed the establishment of a short-lived Republic of Formosa. Japan reacted to the news of the rebellion by deploying naval military forces stationed at Port Arthur for the Japanese invasion of Taiwan (Traditional Chinese: 乙未戰争) (May–October 1895), a five-month conflict that delayed Japanese control of the former Chinese territory. The quickness of the announcement of the rebellion and the Japanese military deployment from Port Arthur gave the Japanese little time to exchange the equipment on hand suitable for the northern climate of Manchuria and the port instead of the tropical climate of the ceded islands.

== Japanese landing at Audi, 29 May 1895 ==
Seven thousand soldiers of the Japanese Imperial Guard, under the command of Prince Kitashirakawa Yoshihisa, embarked Port Arthur on 22 May, with a fleet of fourteen transports. Preparations for the expedition did not include exchanging the winter uniforms for summer uniforms. On 26 May the transports, escorted by the warships Matsushima and Naniwa, reached the Japanese-owned Ryukyu Islands to the northeast of Taiwan, and anchored off the port of Nakagusuku on the eastern coast of Okinawa. On 27 May the new Japanese governor-general of Taiwan, Admiral Kabayama Sukenori, joined the expedition at Tokyo. Reports had reached Japan that the leaders of the "Republic of Formosa" were preparing to resist a Japanese landing so Kabayama ordered the flotilla set sail for Formosa at noon the same day.

Kabayama originally intended to land at Tamsui, but at 10 a.m. on 29 May the invasion flotilla met the Japanese steamship Yokohama Maru five miles to the south of Agincourt Island (Pengjia Islet), close to the coast of Taiwan, and learned that large Chinese forces had been assembled at Tamsui. He instantly changed his plans, and the Japanese flotilla changed course to the southeast and steered for Samtiao Point (三貂角), to the northeast of Keelung. The flotilla anchored off Samtiao Point at 1 p.m., near the village of Audi (澳底), and at 2 p.m. the first Japanese troops began to go ashore. By the end of the day the Japanese infantry and engineers were ashore. A Chinese force of some 500 men approached the landing beach and opened fire, but was soon driven off by the Japanese. Many of the Chinese troops abandoned their uniforms in their flight. On 30 May the artillery and cavalry were landed, and on 31 May supplies of food and ammunition were landed. On the morning of 1 June the invaders set off towards Keelung.

== Engagement at Ruifang, 2 June 1895 ==
The first engagement took place on 2 June, at Sui-hong (Ruifang, 瑞芳), between the Japanese 2nd Infantry Regiment and 500 Chinese soldiers of the Keelung Division, led by General Chung. These were routed by a single charge, and General Chung himself received a bullet as he was being carried to the rear in a sedan chair. The defeated Chinese soldiers told everybody they met that the Japanese soldiers were much stronger and braver than they had expected, and morale in the Chinese forces promptly plunged.

== The battle for Keelung, 3 June 1895 ==
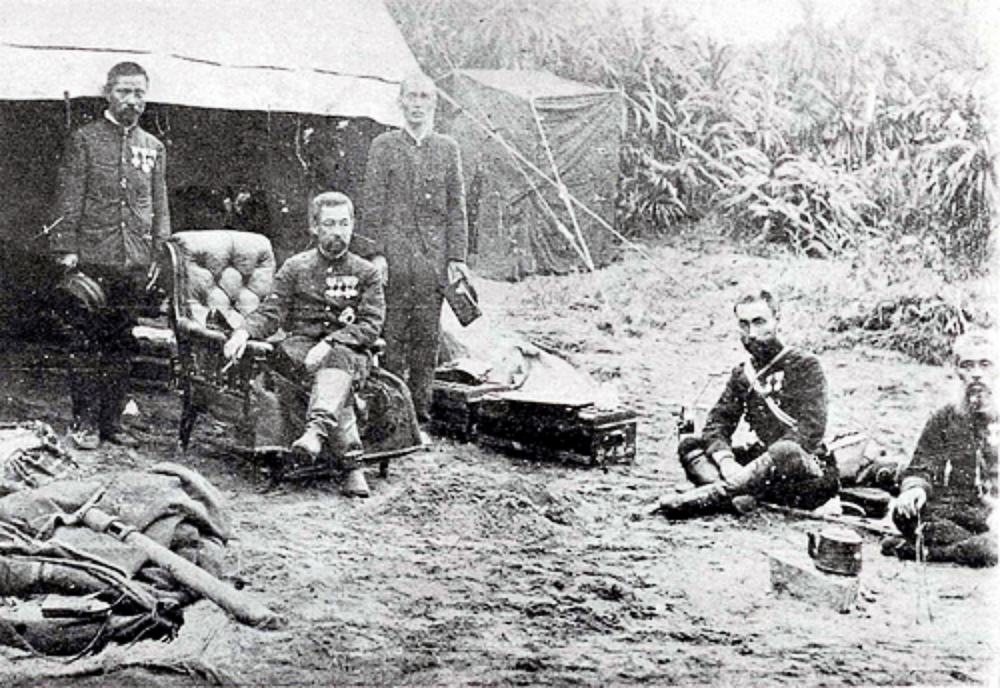
Prince Kitashirakawa and his staff at Audi during the Japanese landing

The first major battle of the invasion took place on 3 June around the Shih-ch'iu-ling battery (Traditional Chinese: 獅球嶺砲台) overlooking the port city of Keelung. Eleven years earlier, during the Sino-French War, Chinese forces had bottled up a French expeditionary corps in Keelung for seven months, and the Shih-ch’iu-ling battery had been held against the French for most of the war. Now, in 1895, following a preliminary bombardment by the warships Matsushima, Oshima, Naniwa, Takachiho and Chiyoda, Colonel Kojima's 2nd Battalion, 1st Infantry Regiment routed the fort's garrison and captured the fort with little loss. The other coastal defence batteries—the Ta-sha-wan and Ehr-sha-wan batteries to the east of Keelung and a battery on Palm Island (modern-day Hoping Island)—hardly put up a struggle. Keelung was occupied on the afternoon of the same day, after the Qing commanders fled the city and left the garrison force leaderless.

The following description was given by Davidson of the bombardment of the coastal batteries and the subsequent battle for the Shih-ch’iu-ling battery:

The military attack was not, however, commenced at once; about two hours being spent in waiting for the arrival of the bulk of the attacking column and reconnoitering the surrounding district. From the position now occupied by the main column, the city of Kelung could be seen below. One slope ran down towards the right and another towards the left, and a single road led down between the two to the city. On the slope to the right stood a high watch-tower, while to the seaward of that was a large fort built to oppose the enemy on sea or shore. To the south of the city were several batteries along the summit of a hill pierced with a railway tunnel, while across the harbor crowning a high hill were the Chinese colors floating over a fort and battery erected there. The bright banners and gaily uniformed Chinese troops could be seen here and there; and with the knowledge that modern guns of large calibre were mounted in the different forts, it appeared that the day’s fight would be a memorable one. The navy was the first to commence active operations. Since early morning, the Japanese squadron, led by the flagship Matsushima with Admiral Arichi in command, had been cruising off Kelung. Later in the day steam pinnaces had carefully reconnoitered the enemy’s positions, and returning had reported that many Chinese soldiers in white uniforms were crossing the small channel to Palm Island and occupying the fort there. The Japanese troops were now seen to be approaching, and to draw off the attention of the various forts, the fleet fired blank cartridges for some time. The forts did not answer, and at 9.13 a.m. the squadron ceased firing. The Oshima now arrived, making five vessels altogether, the others being the Matsushima, Naniwa, Takachiho and Chiyoda. At this time one of the pinnaces brought the information that the Chinese, estimated at 1,000 and carrying a large amount of supplies, were approaching Palm Island, and that upon sighting the launch, the Chinese had fired upon it. The Takachiho now approached the Palm Island fort and fired. This fort as well as the west side fort answered with several rounds. Upon perceiving this, the men-of-war all formed in line of battle, and at about 10.30 o’clock, by taking a circular course, the vessels approached one by one to a position some 6,000 metres distant and bombarded the fort, firing some fifty rounds altogether. Palm Island fort with its fine modern guns (one 12-inch Armstrong, two 10-inch and two 7-inch Krupps) made but little effort to defend itself, and after firing some 12 rounds ceased altogether. One of the other forts with two 7-inch guns fired 6 rounds. The shells of one fort invariably went over the Japanese warships, while those from the other as invariably fell short.

At noon, Colonel Kojima with the bulk of the column began to march down into the valley in the direction of Kelung. Under ordinary circumstances this would have exposed him to a strong fire, but fortunately it began to rain so heavily that the onward movement was quite concealed. On arriving at the entrance of the town, however, their presence was greeted with a heavy fire from the surprised soldiers. The Japanese returned the fire with a good will, and, a second column supporting them from the heights above, the Chinese soon fell back, retreating into the village, and eventually out along the railway track towards Taipehfu, leaving Kelung in the possession of the column of 500 men. Meanwhile, the fort garrisons still remained to be dealt with. The west side fort, armed with two 7-inch Krupps, as well as smaller guns, was found the most difficult place to capture. Its very high elevation, commanding a positions with steep slopes on all sides, made it impossible for the Japanese infantry to effect any damage upon it. Even a mountain gun had little or no effect, there being no position from which shells could be thrown into the fort. After several hours’ engagement, some six hundred of the garrison seemed about to retreat, and the rapidity of the fire from the fort greatly lessened. The Japanese took advantage of this pause, and a squad of nineteen privates was able to gain entrance to the fort from the rear and was soon followed by a company. The rest of the Chinese garrison immediately fled, and the Japanese flag was raised over the fort.

Meanwhile the castle fort near the Custom House with three 7-inch Krupps and four Krupp field pieces had fallen an easy capture, the troops marching in singing their national song. Palm Island fort with its mammoth guns had given up with scarcely a struggle. The garrison from the east side fort, with two 7-inch Krupps and one 7-inch Armstrong, had also evacuated it without returning the Japanese fire. From Chinese sources it would appear that prior to the capture of the village, the Cantonese troops occupying a battery on the hill over the old railway tunnel, made the best fight, but oddly enough it was against their own countrymen instead of the Japanese. It seems that, as the deserting Chinese soldiers from the various Kelung camps attempted to run away by the road passing the encampment, the only road then open, the Cantonese shot and cut them down, killing and wounding about fifty, and driving the others back. The Japanese loss during the engagement was three men killed, one officer and twenty-five men wounded; and the Chinese had about two hundred and fifty men killed. Considering the great strength of the forts, and the large force of 12,000 well equipped Chinese, the Japanese, with forces strikingly inferior in number and unprovided with field artillery, had reason to feel proud of their day’s work.
