= Eternal Golden Castle =

Fortification in Anping, Tainan, Taiwan

- 億載金城
- Anping, Tainan, Taiwan
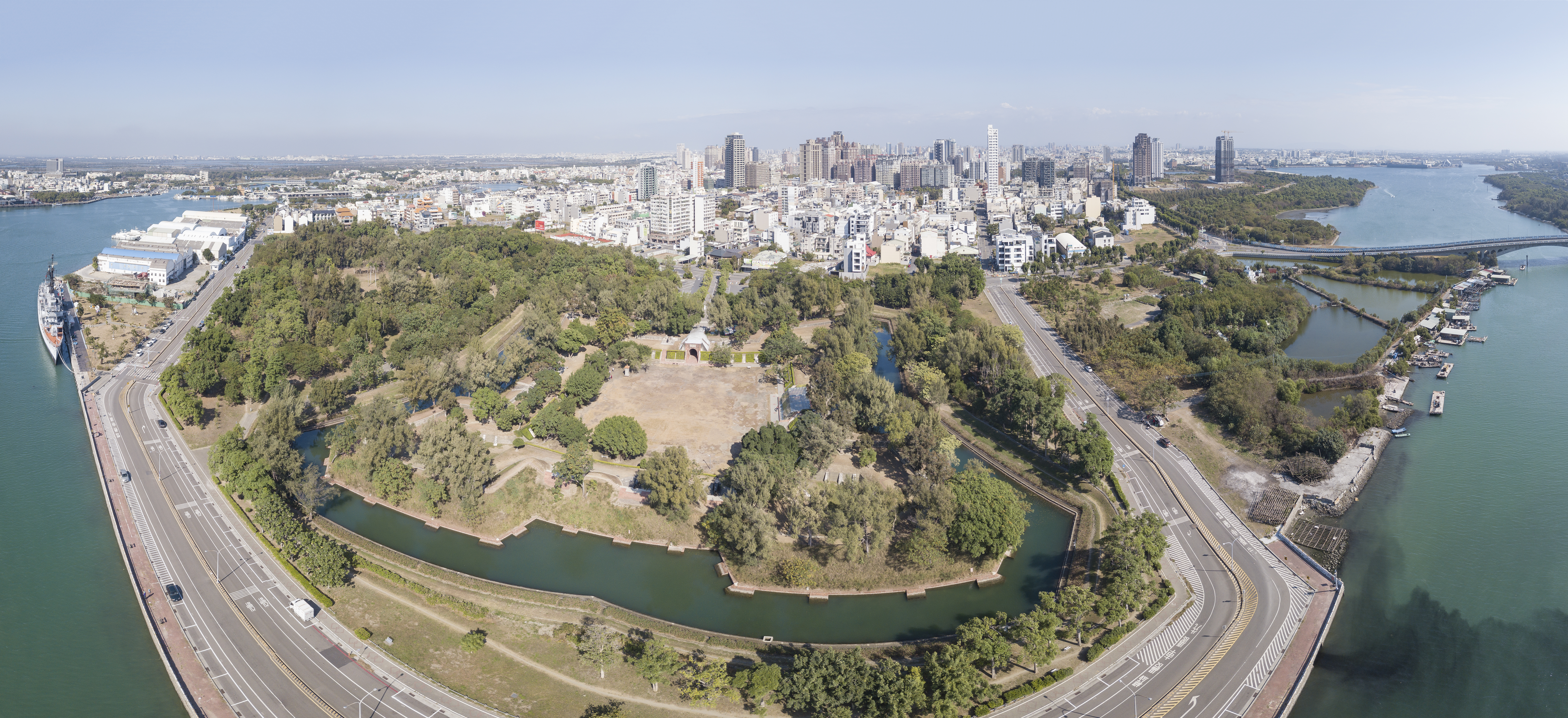
- Aerial view of Eternal Golden Castle

Site information
- Type: Castle
- Owner: Qing Dynasty (1874-1895); Empire of Japan (1895-1945); Taiwan (Republic of China) (1945-present)

Location
- Location within Tainan
- Coordinates: 22°59′15″N 120°09′32″E

Site history
- Built: 1874–1876
- Built by: Shen Baozhen

Eternal Golden Castle
- Traditional Chinese: 億載金城
Transcriptions
Standard Mandarin
- Hanyu Pinyin: Yìzǎi Jīnchéng
Southern Min
- Hokkien POJ: Ek-chài kim-siâⁿ

Erkunshen Battery
- Traditional Chinese: 二鯤鯓砲台
Transcriptions
Standard Mandarin
- Hanyu Pinyin: Èrkūnshēn Pàotái
- Wade–Giles: Èrh-k'ūn-shēn P'ào-t'ái
Southern Min
- Hokkien POJ: Jī-khun-sin Phàu-tâi

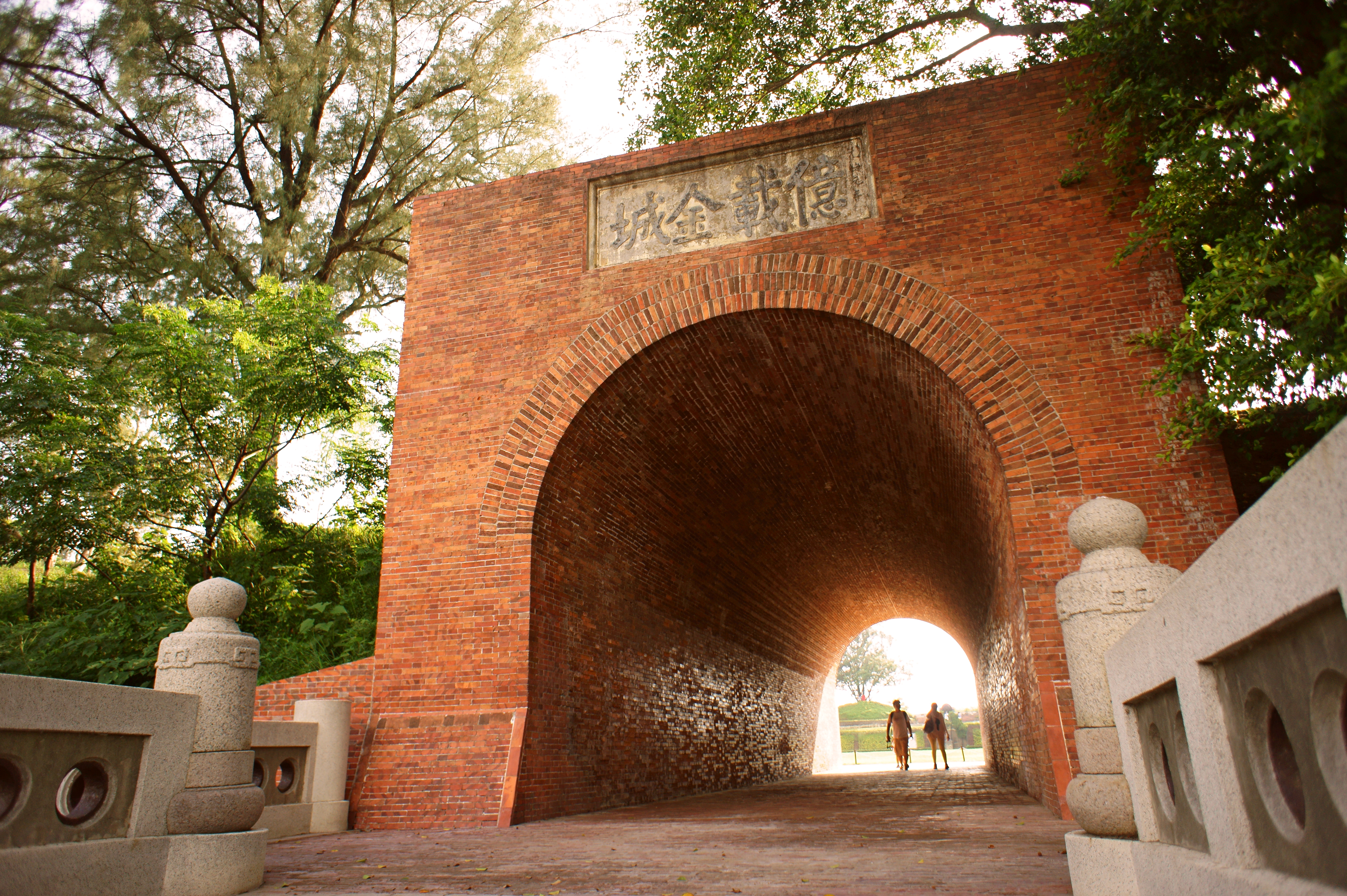
The entrance to the castle.

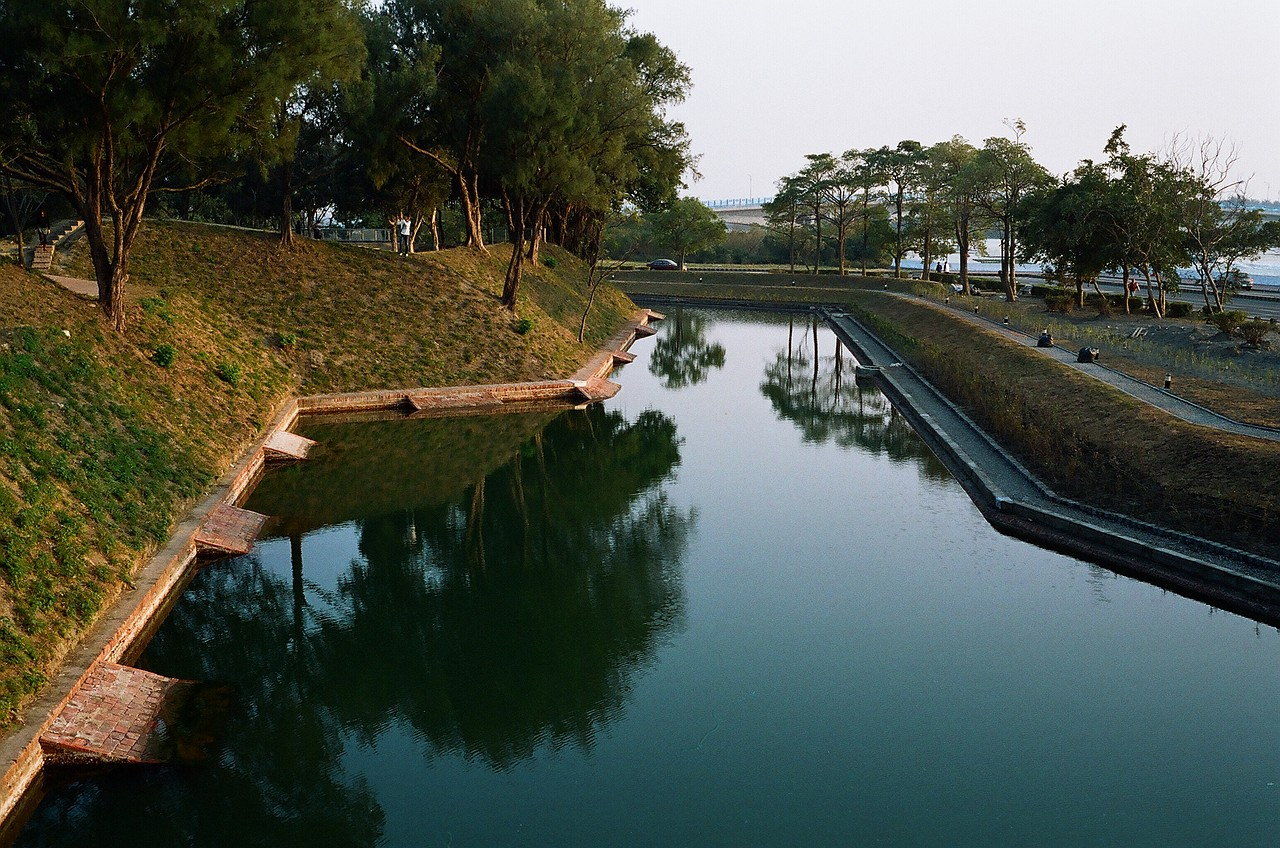
The moat surrounding the castle.

The arched gate and the entrance bridge of the Eternal Golden Castle

The Eternal Golden Castle (Chinese: 億載金城), alternatively but less well known as Erkunshen Battery (二鯤鯓砲台), is a defensive castle in Anping District, Tainan, Taiwan.

== History ==
The castle was built in 1874 and completed on 1876 by the famous Qing official Shen Baozhen in order to safeguard the coast and to defend the island against Japanese invasions. This military facility saw its first action in the Sino-French war of 1884. When Taiwan was ceded to the Empire of Japan by the Qing in 1895, the Taiwanese people fought under the Republic of Formosa banner against the invading Japanese battleships from this fortress. Under Japanese control this military facility lost its value. Its value is completely lost when during the Russo-Japanese War the imperial Japanese government sold some of the fort's cannons.

== Features ==
There is a park near the castle grounds where people can enjoy picnics, as well as rental paddle boats for people to sail around the castle. There are occasional music performances in the evening, and actors sometimes fire the last remaining artillery gun in the castle to give visitors a fully immersive experience.

== Transportation ==
By driving: Take the Yongkang Interchange (Exit 319) of Freeway 1 and head in a south-westerly direction.

By public transport:

- Tainan Bus
  - 【2】 Kunshan University of Science and Technology－Tainan Train Station－Anping
  - 【14】 Tainan Train Station－Buddhist Tainan Tzu Chi Senior High School
  - 【98】 Tainan Bus Station－Tainan Train Station－Sunset Platform－Cigu Salt Mountain
  - 【Sightseeing Bus】 Tainan Train Station－Tainan Train Station（Circular Line）
- Geya Bus
  - 【19】 The Indigenous Culture Museum－Tainan Train Station－Dawan Senior High School

== Ticket prices ==
There is a NT$70 fare for each visitor.

== See also ==
- List of tourist attractions in Taiwan
- Ershawan Battery
- Fort Zeelandia
- Fort Provintia
- History of Taiwan

== Bibliography ==
- Bender, Andrew et al. (2004). Taiwan. San Francisco: Lonely Planet.
