= Ershawan Battery =

Fort in Zhongzheng, Keelung, Taiwan

- 二沙灣砲臺
- Zhongzheng, Keelung, Taiwan
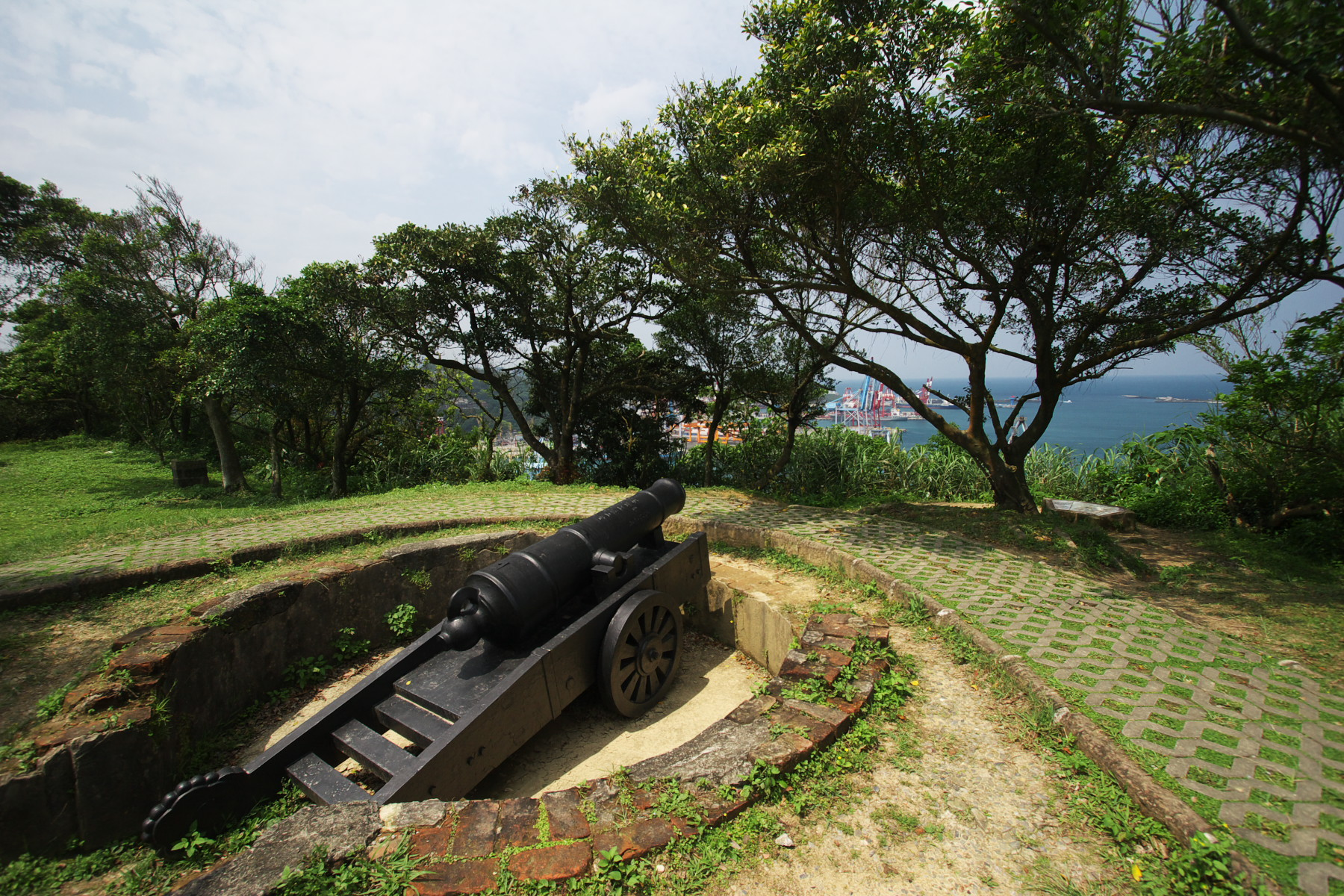

Site information
- Type: Fort

Location
- Taiwan
- Coordinates: 25°08′15″N 121°45′27″E

Site history
- Built: 1840
- Built by: Qing Dynasty
- In use: 1840-1895
- Battles/wars: Sino-French War; Japanese Invasion of Taiwan

Ershawan Battery (traditional Chinese: 二沙灣砲臺; simplified Chinese: 二沙湾炮台; pinyin: Èrshāwān Pàotái), or better known as Tenable Gate of the Sea (Chinese: 海門天險; Wade–Giles: hai-men-tien-hsien) is a battery emplacements camp in Zhongzheng District, Keelung, Taiwan. It was built during Taiwan's Qing era and was the site of combat between the French and Chinese forces during the Sino-French War. It was the command post of Liu Ming-chuan, who was later appointed by Qing court as the first governor of Taiwan, when he was charged with the defense of Keelung during the war. It lost its military value under Japanese rule and is currently listed as a class one national historical monument.

== History ==
The battery was first constructed in 1840 by Yao Ying (Chinese: 姚瑩), disciplinary officer of the Qing garrison in Taiwan. It was originally located by the sea and was used by the garrison to fend off British assaults during the Opium War. It was part of the Taiwan Seventeen Fortification Plan (Chinese: 台灣十七口設防圖說狀), which Yao composed and presented to the Qing court.

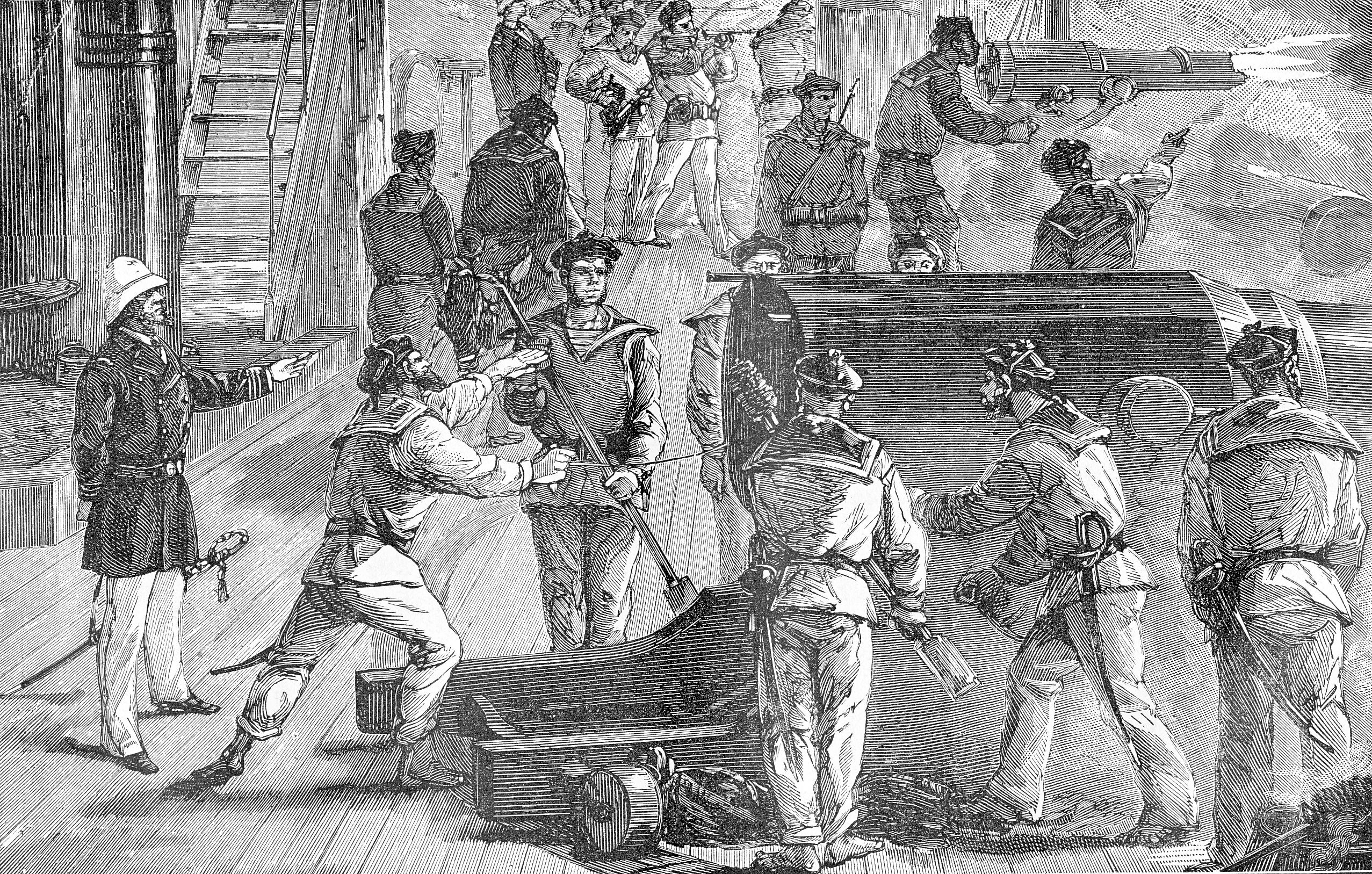
The French ironclad La Galissonnière bombards the Ershawan Battery, 5 August 1884

The fortification that exists today, however, is not at the seaside. When the Sino-French War broke out in 1884, Liu Ming-chuan, who was in charge of defense of Keelung, constructed a battery at the present-day location with materials cannibalized from the older fortification, and used it as a major strong point in his defense plan. The battery was put out of action on 5 August 1884 during a bombardment of the Keelung forts by three French warships and was occupied by the French during the subsequent Keelung Campaign (October 1884 to April 1885). During the French occupation of Keelung, it was renamed Fort La Galissonnière by the invaders, after the French ironclad which had bombarded it in August 1884. The French built a cemetery nearby in which around 500 dead French soldiers and sailors who died during the campaign were buried (most of them victims of cholera and other diseases rather than battle casualties). The cemetery was moved from its original location in the early years of the twentieth century, and in its new location still exists today.

The battery briefly saw action during the Japanese invasion of Taiwan in 1895. Along with the other coastal fortifications of Keelung, it was bombarded by five Japanese warships during the Battle of Keelung on 3 June 1895, and was captured by the Japanese Imperial Guards Division with little difficulty.

After Taiwan was ceded to Japan in 1895, the battery lost its significance as a military base, and fell into disrepair. It was later classified as a class one national historical monument by the Republic of China government, who took control of Taiwan at the conclusion of World War II.

== See also ==
- Eternal Golden Castle
