= Taichung County =

Former county of Taiwan

Taichung County 臺中縣
- County of the Republic of China
- 1945–2010
- Flag Coat of arms

- Location of Taichung County on Taiwan.
- Capital: Yuanlin (1945–1950); Fongyuan (1950–2010)
- History
  - Established: 26 November 1945
  - Disestablished: 25 December 2010
- Contained within
  - Country: Republic of China (1945–2010); Empire of Japan (1945–1952, de jure)
- Political subdivisions: 3 County-administered cities 5 Urban townships 12 Rural townships 1 Mountain indigenous township
Preceded by
Taichū Prefecture
Succeeded by
1950: Changhua County
Nantou County
2010: Taichung City
- Today part of: Part of the Taichung (Special municipality), Changhua County, Nantou County

Taichung County
- Traditional Chinese: 臺中縣 or 台中縣
- Simplified Chinese: 台中县
Transcriptions
Standard Mandarin
- Hanyu Pinyin: Táizhōng Xiàn
- Wade–Giles: T'ai²-chung¹ Hsien⁴
Hakka
- Romanization: Thòi-chûng Yen
Southern Min
- Hokkien POJ: Tâi-tiong-kōan

Taichung County was a county in central Taiwan between 1945 and 2010. The county seat was in Yuanlin Township before 1950 and Fongyuan City after 1950.

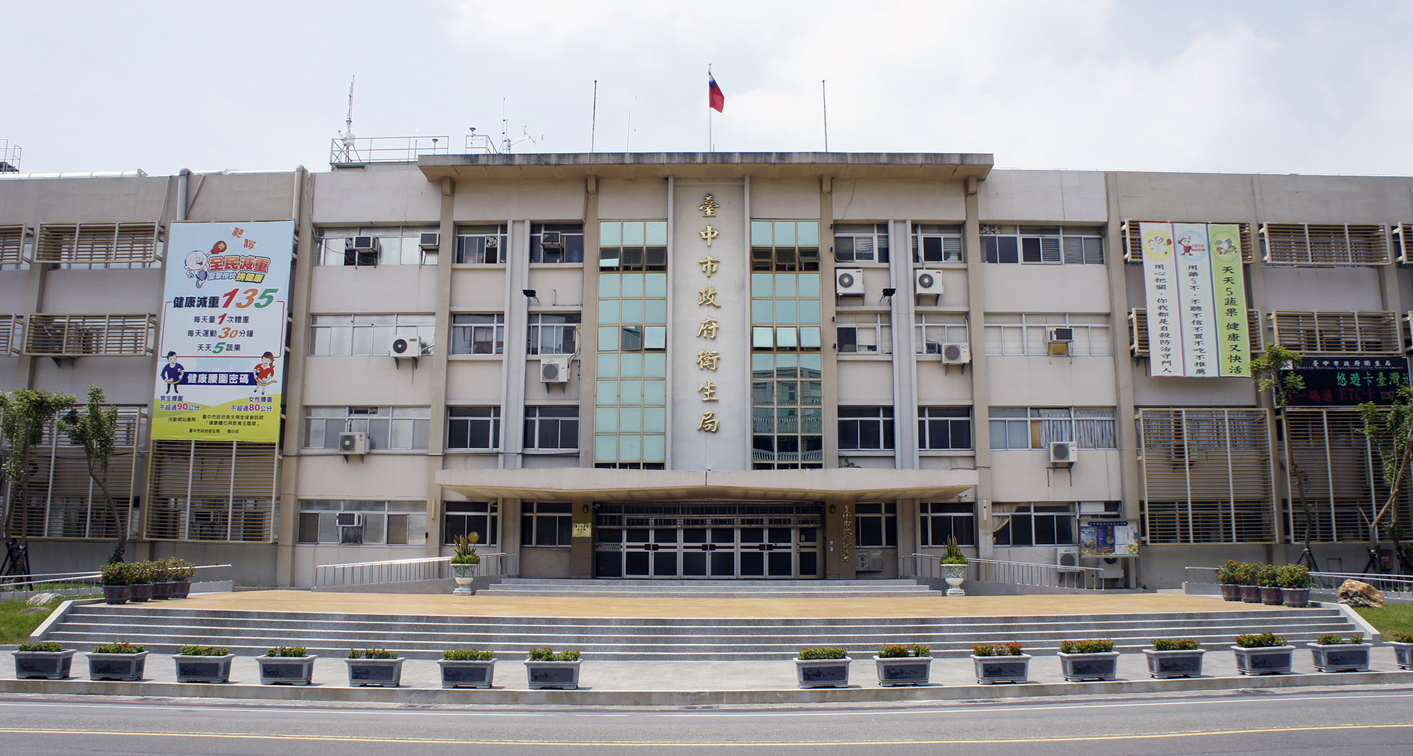
Taichung County Hall (1976-1996)

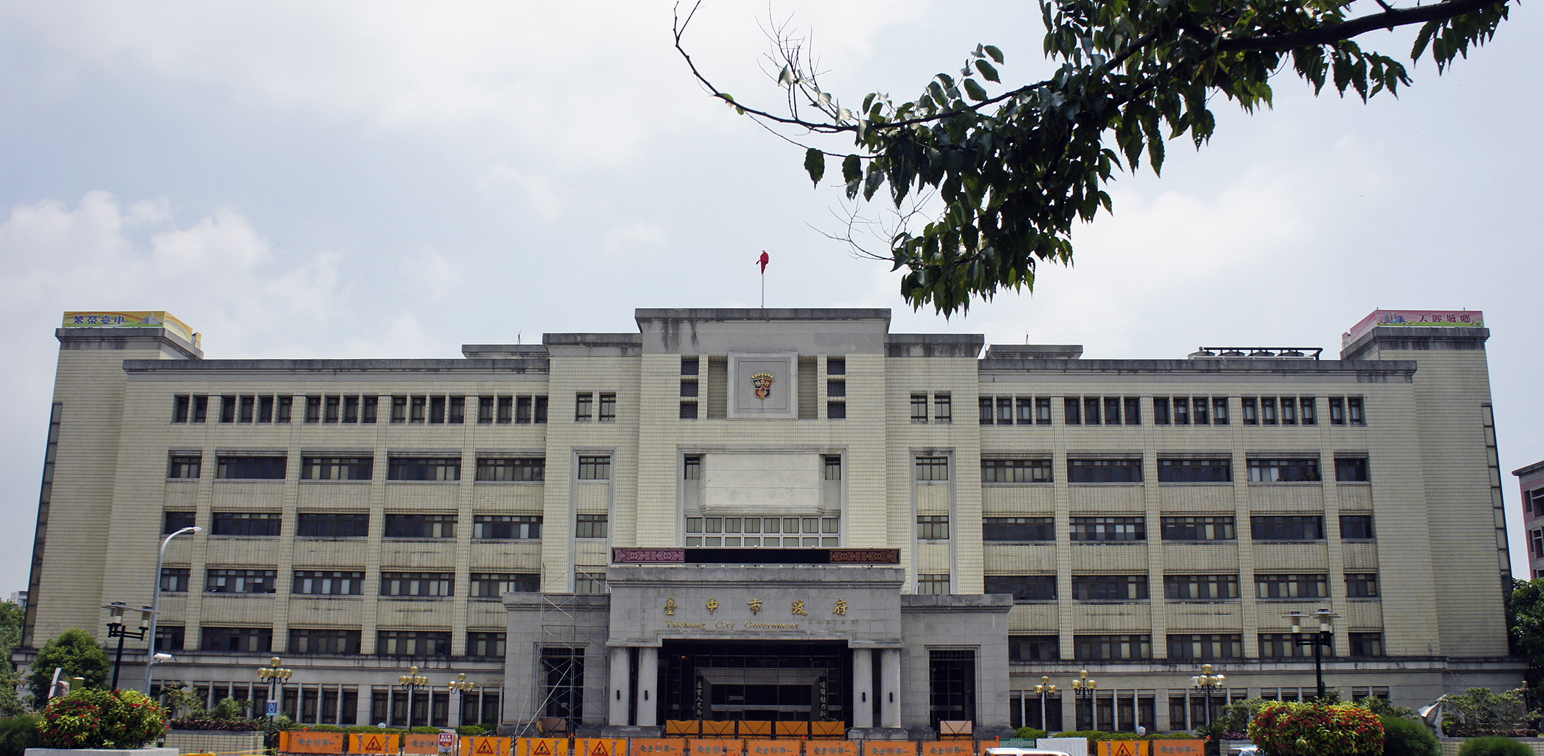
Taichung County Hall (1996-2010)

== History ==
Taichung County was established on 26 November 1945 on the territory of Taichū Prefecture (臺中州) shortly after the end of World War II. In the early years, Taichung County consists of most territory of Taichū Prefecture except the territory near cities of Taichū (Taichung) and Shōka (Changhua). The county is subdivide into districts (區), which is reformed from Japanese districts (郡). The districts are divided into townships.

Districts in Taichū Prefecture		Districts in Taichung County		Notes
Toyohara	豊原郡	Feng-yüan	豐原區	
Tōsei	東勢郡	Tung-shih	東勢區	
Taikō	大甲郡	Ta-chia	大甲區	
Daiton	大屯郡	Ta-t'un	大屯區	
Shōka	彰化郡	Chang-hua	彰化區	
Inrin	員林郡	Yüan-lin	員林區	The county seat from 1945 to 1950
Hokuto	北斗郡	Pei-tou	北斗區	
Nantō	南投郡	Nan-t'ou	南投區	
Takeyama	竹山郡	Chu-shan	竹山區	
Nōkō	能高郡	Neng-kao	能高區	
Niitaka	新高郡	Hsin-kao	新高區	Renamed to Yü-shan District (玉山區) in 1948
		Chung-feng	中峰區	Established in 1949, covers the mountain indigenous townships

On 16 August 1950, another division reform was implemented. The southern part of the county was separated and established Changhua County and Nantou County. The remaining Taichung County has territory equivalent to the Toyohara (Fengyüan), Tōsei (Tungshih), Taikō (Tachia), and Daiton (Tatun) in the Japanese era. In addition, districts in the remaining part of Taichung County was defunct. All townships were directly controlled by the County Government. On 25 December 2010, the county merged with Taichung City to form a larger single special municipality.

== Administration ==
The subdivisions of the County remained mostly stable between 1950 and 2010. However, some changed has also been made.

- 1 Oct 1955, Neipu Township (內埔鄉) was renamed Houli Township (后里鄉)
- 7 Jun 1973, two northeast most villages in Hoping Township (和平鄉) was separated to form a new county-level division — Lishan Constructing Administrative Bureau (梨山建設管理局).
- 1 Mar 1973, Fengyuan (豐原鎮) reformed from an urban township to a county-administered city for its population.
- 18 Feb 1982, Lishan Constructing Administrative Bureau dissolved, the two villages returned to Hoping Township.
- 1 Nov 1993, Tali (大里鄉) reformed from a rural township to a county-administered city for its population.
- 1 Aug 1996, Taiping (太平鄉) reformed from a rural township to a county-administered city for its population.

In 25 Dec 2010, The county was merged with Taichung City, all cities and townships became districts. On the eve of merging with Taichung City, the county consists of the following administrative divisions

Type	Name	Chinese	Taiwanese	Hakka	Region
Cities	Fengyuan (Fongyuan)	豐原市	Hong-goân	Fûng-ngièn	Fongyuan
Cities	Dali	大里市	Tāi-lí	Thai-lî	Datun
Cities	Taiping	太平市	Thài-pêng	Thai-phìn	Datun
Urban townships	Dajia	大甲鎮	Tāi-kah	Thai-kap	Dajia
Urban townships	Qingshui (Cingshuei)	清水鎮	Chheng-chúi	Tshîn-súi	Dajia
Urban townships	Shalu	沙鹿鎮	Soa-la̍k	Sâ-lu̍k	Dajia
Urban townships	Wuqi (Wuci)	梧棲鎮	Gō·-chhe	Ǹg-tshi	Dajia
Urban townships	Dongshi (Dongshih)	東勢鎮	Tang-sì	Tûng-sṳ	Dongshih
Rural townships	Longjing	龍井鄉	Liông-chéⁿ	Liùng-tsiáng	Dajia
Rural townships	Dadu	大肚鄉	Tōa-tō͘	Thai-tú	Dajia
Rural townships	Da'an (Da-an)	大安鄉	Tāi-an	Thai-ôn	Dajia
Rural townships	Waipu	外埔鄉	Goā-po͘	Ngoi-phû	Dajia
Rural townships	Houli	后里鄉	Aū-lí	Heu-lî	Fongyuan
Rural townships	Tanzi (Tanzih)	潭子鄉	Thâm-chú	Thâm-tsṳ́	Fongyuan
Rural townships	Daya	大雅鄉	Tāi-ngé	Thai-ngâ	Fongyuan
Rural townships	Shengang	神岡鄉	Sin-kóng	Sṳ̀n-kông	Fongyuan
Rural townships	Shigang (Shihgang)	石岡鄉	Chio̍h-kng	Sa̍k-kóng	Dongshih
Rural townships	Xinshe (Sinshe)	新社鄉	Sin-siā	Sîn-sa	Dongshih
Rural townships	Wufeng (Wufong)	霧峰鄉	Bū-hong	Vú-fûng	Datun
Rural townships	Wuri (Wurih)	烏日鄉	O·-ji̍t	Vû-ngit	Datun
Mountain indigenous township	Heping	和平鄉	Hô-pêng	Fò-phìn	Dongshih

== Transportation ==
- Freeway
  - Freeway 1 (Taiwan)
  - Freeway 3 (Taiwan)
  - Freeway 4 (Taiwan)
- Railways
  - Taichung line
  - West Coast line (Taiwan)
- High-speed rail
  - Taichung HSR station
- Harbor
  - Port of Taichung
- Airport
  - Taichung International Airport

== Other ==
=== Education ===
- Asia University
- Providence University
- Taichung Japanese School

=== Hospitals ===
- Jen-Ai Hospital - Dali (大里仁愛醫院)
- Taichung Tzu Chi General Hospital (台中慈濟醫院)

== See also ==
- Taichung
