= Provincial Highway 74 (Taiwan) =

Road in Taiwan

Provincial Highway 74
- 台74線
- 快官烏日線 (Kuaiguan-Wufeng Expressway) 台中環線 (Taichung Ring Expressway)

Route information
- Maintained by Directorate General of Highways
- Length: 37.841 km (23.513 mi)
- Existed: February 1999–present

Major junctions
- West end: Nat 3 in Changhua City, Changhua County
- East end: Nat 3 in Wufeng, Taichung City

Location
- Country: Taiwan

Highway system
- Highway system in Taiwan
← Prov 72	→ Prov 76

Provincial Highway 74

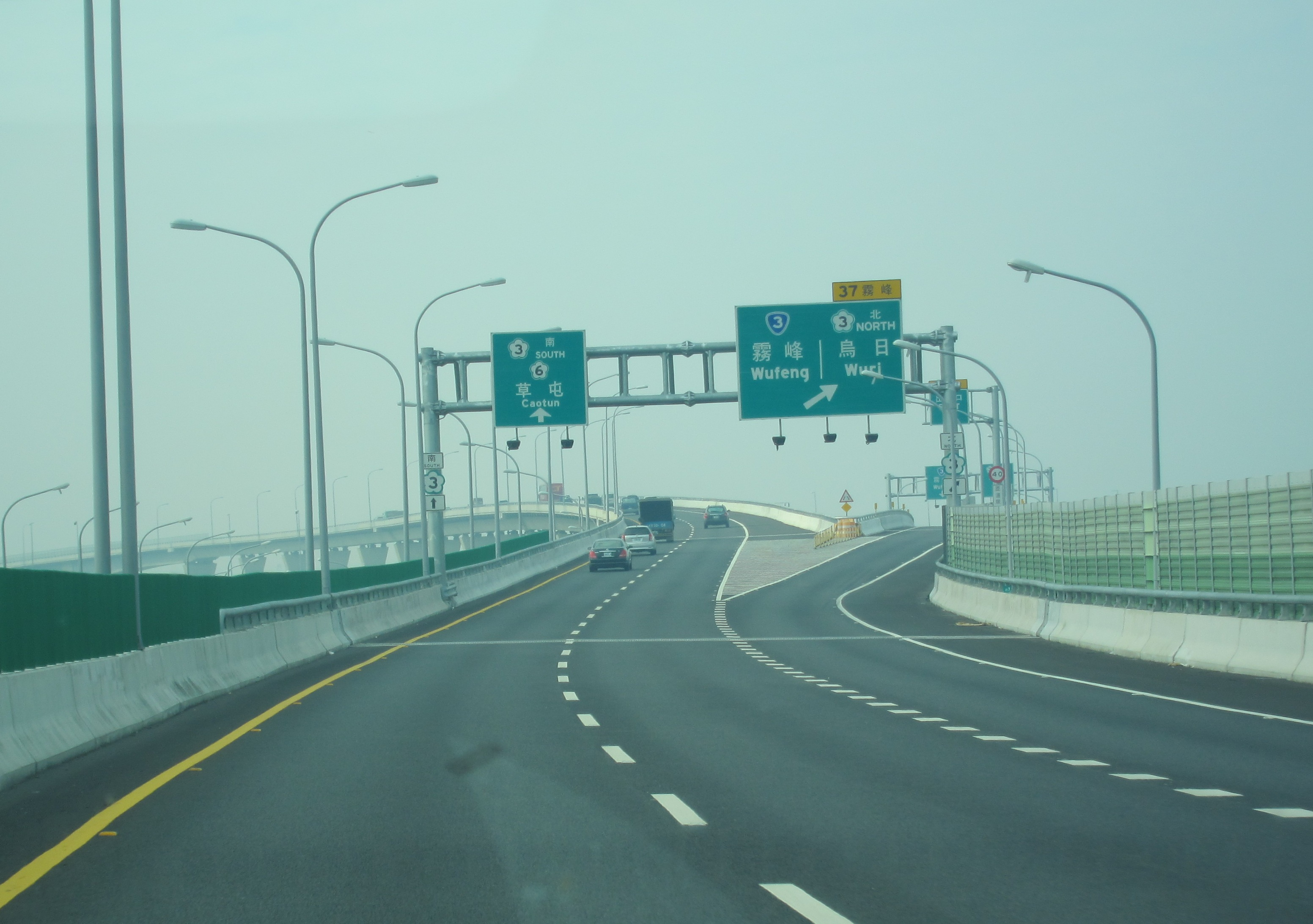
Provincial Highway 74

Provincial Highway 74 (Chinese: 台74線), also known as the Kuaiguan-Wufeng Expressway (快官烏日線) or Taichung Ring Expressway (台中環線), is an expressway around Taichung City. It starts at Kuaiguan Interchange on Freeway No. 3 in Changhua City and ends at Wufeng Interchange on Freeway No. 3 in Wufeng District.

== Length ==
=== Main line ===
The total length of main line is 37.841 km. The route between Kuaiguan Interchange and Zhongqing Rd. was opened to the public on May 5, 2002. During this time it was known as the Taichung-Changhua Expressway (中彰快速道路). Afterwards, the east section between Songzhu Rd. and Wufeng Interchange was opened to the public on December 31, 2011. The route between Zhongqing Rd. and Chongde Rd. was opened to traffic on December 31, 2013.

=== Branch Line ===
The branch line (Provincial Highway No. 74A, Chinese: 台74甲線) which starts at the western end of Provincial Highway No. 74 (Kuaiguan Interchange) and ends at Provincial Highway No. 1 in Huatan, Changhua. Its length is 10.5km (6.5 miles).

== Major Cities Along the Route ==
- Changhua City
- Taichung City

== Exit list ==
County	Location	km	mi	Exit	Name	Destinations	Notes
Changhua	Changhua	0.000	0.000	0	Kuaiguan	Nat 3 – Nantou, Hemei; Prov 74A south	Roadway continues as PH 74A
Taichung City	Wuri	1.650	1.025	1	Chenggong	Wuri	
Taichung City	Nantun	4.000	2.485	4	HSR Taichung	THSR Taichung Station	
Taichung City	Nantun	5.500	3.418	5	Nantun 1	Section 4, Huanzhong Road	Eastbound exit and westbound entrance
Taichung City	Nantun	7.140	4.437	7	Nantun 2	Cty 136 (Wuquan West Road)	
Taichung City	Xitun	8.900	5.530	8	Xitun 1	Shizheng Road	
Taichung City	Xitun	10.000	6.214	10	Xitun 2	Chaoma Road / Qinghai Road	
Taichung City	Xitun	10.940	6.798	11	Xitun 3	Xitun Road	
Taichung City	Xitun	13.000	8.078	13	Beitun 1	Kaixuan Road	
Taichung City	Beitun	14.8	9.2	14	Beitun 2	Section 3, Songzhu Road, Nat 1 – Fengyuan, Prov 1B (Zhongqing Road) – Daya District	
Taichung City	Beitun	16.987	10.555	16	Chongde	Chongde Road	
Taichung City	Tanzi	18.847	11.711	18	Tanzi	Prov 3 (Zhongshan Road) – Tanzi District	
Taichung City	Tanzi	20.1	12.5	20	Tanzi JCT	Nat 4 – Tanzi, Fengyuan	
Taichung City	Beitun	22.750	14.136	22	Songzhu	Section 1, Songzhu Road / Dongshan Road	
Taichung City	Beitun	24.411	15.168	24	Taiyuan	Taiyuan Road	
Taichung City	Taiping–East district line	26.935	16.737	26	Taiping	Zhongshan Road, Leye Road, Dongping Road – Taiping District	
Taichung City	Dali	30.137	18.726	30	Dali 1	Defang South Road, Zhenxing Road, Taiping Road	
Taichung City	Dali	32.854	20.415	32	Dali 2	To Prov 63 (Zhongtou Highway) / Jiati South Road, Zhishan Road	
Taichung City	Dali	34.7	21.6	34	Caohu	Zhongshan Road-Dali Software Park	
Taichung City	Wufeng	37.841	23.513	37	Wufeng	Nat 3 to Nat 6 – Caotun, Wuri District; Prov 3 – Wufeng	
Taichung City	1.000 mi = 1.609 km; 1.000 km = 0.621 mi: Incomplete access; Unopened						

== Intersections with other Freeways and Expressways ==
- Freeway No. 3 at Kuaiguan Interchange in Changhua City and Wufeng Interchange in Wufeng District.
- Freeway No.4 at Tanzi JCT in Tanzi
- Freeway No. 1 at Beitun 2 Interchange in Beitun.

== Notes ==
The original plan has a western section between Changhua Coastal Industrial Park and Hemei Interchange of Freeway in Hemei, Changhua. The exact route has now been constructed and named as Provincial Highway No. 61B. It was opened to the public on October 15, 2011.

== See also ==
- Highway system in Taiwan
