= Provincial Highway 84 (Taiwan) =

Road in Taiwan

Provincial Highway 84
- 台84線
- 北門玉井線 (Beimen-Yujing Expressway)

Route information
- Maintained by Directorate General of Highways
- Length: 41.428 km (25.742 mi)
- Existed: July 1998–present

Major junctions
- West end: Prov 61 in Beimen, Tainan City
- Nat 1 in Xiaying, Tainan City; Nat 3 in Guantian, Tainan City
- East end: Prov 20 / Prov 3 in Yujing, Tainan City

Location
- Country: Taiwan

Highway system
- Highway system in Taiwan
← Prov 82	→ Prov 86

Provincial Highway 84

Provincial Highway 84 (Chinese: 台84線) is an expressway, which begins in Beimen, Tainan, on the Provincial Highway No. 61 and ends in Yujing, Tainan, on Zhongshan Road (Provincial Highway No. 20).

== History ==
The route between Beimen, Tainan, and Syuejia, Tainan, is under construction and will be completed in 2014.

A short section in Beimen, Tainan, between National Highway No. 61 and Provincial Highway No. 17 was open in 2004. It functions as a feeder to National Highway No. 61.

== Length ==
The total length is 41.428 km (25.742 mi).

== Exit list ==
The entire route is within Tainan City.

City	Location	km	Mile	Exit	Name	Destinations	Notes
Tainan City	Beimen	0	0.0	0	Beimen System	Prov 61 – Jiangjun, Budai	
Tainan City	Beimen	1	0.62	1	Beimen	Prov 17 – Beimen	
Tainan City	Syuejia	8.6	5.3	8	Xuejia	Prov 19 – Yanshuei, Syuejia	
Tainan City	Xiaying	14.0	8.7	14	Xiaying	Nat 1 – Xinying, Madou	
Tainan City	Madou	17.6	10.9	17	Madou	Prov 19a – Xiaying, Madou	
Tainan City	Guantian	21.2	13.2	21	Xizhuang	Cty 171 – Xizhuang	
Tainan City	Guantian	26.5	16.5	26	Dutou	Prov 1 – Guantian, Shanhua	Also serves as Eastbound Exit to Freeway 3, No Westbound Exit
Tainan City	Guantian	27.8	17.3	27	Guantian System	Nat 3 – Chiayi City, Tainan City	Also serves as Westbound Exit to Highway 1, No Eastbound Exit
Tainan City	Danei	32.5	20.2	32	Toushe	TR tn182-1– Toushe, Danei	
Tainan City	Danei	35.2	21.9	35	Erxi	TR tn182 – Dapaolun, Erxi	
Tainan City	Danei	36– 37	22– 23	Zoumalai Tunnel			
Tainan City	Danei	37.8	23.5	End Freeway			
Tainan City	Yujing	41.428	25.742	41		Prov 20 / Prov 3 – Downtown Yujing, Nansi, Zuojhen	
1.000 mi = 1.609 km; 1.000 km = 0.621 mi: Incomplete access

== Intersections ==
- National Highway No. 3 at Guantian JCT. in Guantian, Tainan
- National Highway No. 1 at Xiaying JCT. in Xiaying, Tainan
- Provincial Highway No. 61 at Beimen IC. in Beimen, Tainan(under construction)

== See also ==
- Highway system in Taiwan
