= National Freeway 3A =

Highway in Taiwan

National freeway 3a
- Taipei Connecting Line

Route information
- Maintained by Taiwan Area National Freeway Bureau
- Length: 5.6 km (3.5 mi)

Location
- Country: Taiwan

Highway system
- Highway system in Taiwan
← Nat 3	→ Nat 4

National freeway 3A (native:國道三號甲線;三甲) is a spur of national freeway 3 for connection of downtown Taipei City. It begins south of downtown Taipei City at the intersection of Xinhai Road and Fanglan Road, near National Taiwan University, and ends in Shenkeng, New Taipei City on municipal highway 106B. It's tolled as it is the spur of National freeway 3, it is one of the two National Highways to be signed as an expressway.

== Length ==
The total length is 5.6 km.

== Major Cities Along the Route ==
- Taipei City
- New Taipei City

== Places Along The Highway ==
- Taipei City ( Daan District) 大安區 (Daan District)
- Taipei City ( Rural Wenshan District) (Has Countyway 106 to go to the urban part of Wenshan District (Muzha and Jingmei)
- New Taipei City (Shenkeng District(Originally Shenkeng Township)

== Exit List ==
County	Location	km	mi	Exit	Name	Destinations	Notes
Taipei City	Da'an	0.0	0.0	0	Taipei Ending	Jianguo Rd, Xinhai Rd	
Taipei City	Wenshan	3.6	2.2	3	Wanfang	Xinyi Expressway, Taipei Zoo	
Taipei City	Wenshan	5.1	3.2	5	Muzha	Freeway 3 to Nangang and Xindian	
New Taipei City	Shenkeng	6.0	3.7	6	Shenkeng End	City Road 106B to Shenkeng	
1.000 mi = 1.609 km; 1.000 km = 0.621 mi

== Lanes ==
The freeway has 2 lanes in each direction for its entire length.

== See also ==
- Highway system in Taiwan
