= Provincial Highway 25 (Taiwan) =

Provincial highway in Taiwan

Provincial Highway 25
- 台25線
- Fenglin Highway

Route information
- Maintained by Directorate General of Highways
- Length: 18.275 km (11.356 mi)

Major junctions
- North end: Prov 1 in Fengshan
- Prov 88 in Daliao
- East end: Prov 17 in Linyuan

Location
- Country: Taiwan

Highway system
- Highway system in Taiwan
← Prov 24	→ Prov 26

Provincial Highway 25 is a Taiwanese highway that starts from Fengshan and ends in Linyuan, both in Kaohsiung City. The highway is also known as Fenglin Highway (鳳林公路). The route length is 18.275 kilometres (11.356 mi).

== See also ==
- Highway system in Taiwan
