= Provincial Highway 86 (Taiwan) =

Road in Taiwan

Provincial Highway 86
- 台86線
- 台南關廟線 (Tainan-Guanmiao Expressway)

Route information
- Maintained by Directorate General of Highways
- Length: 20 km (12 mi)
- Existed: 30 December 1999–present

Major junctions
- West end: Prov 17 in South District, Tainan City
- Nat 1 in Rende, Tainan City
- East end: Nat 3 in Guanmiao, Tainan City

Location
- Country: Taiwan

Highway system
- Highway system in Taiwan
← Prov 84	→ Prov 88

Provincial Highway 86

Provincial Highway 86 (Chinese: 台86線) is an expressway, which begins in South District, Tainan on Provincial Highway No. 17 and ends in Guanmiao District, Tainan on National Highway No. 3 in Taiwan.

== Length ==
The total length is 20 km.

== Exit List ==
The entire route is within Tainan City.

City	Location	km	Mile	Exit	Name	Destinations	Notes
Tainan City	South District	0	0.0	0	Tainan End	Prov 17 – Cheting, Anping	Begin Freeway
Tainan City	South District	2	1.2	2	Wanli	Yongcheng Rd.	
Tainan City	Rende	5.3	3.3	5	Tainan	Prov 1 – Central Tainan City, Hunei	
Tainan City	Rende	8.7	5.4	8	Rende System	Nat 1 – Central Tainan City, Lujhu	
Tainan City	Rende	10.3	6.4	10	Shanglun	TR tn151 – Rende, Gueiren	
Tainan City	Gueiren	11.8	7.3	11	Datan	TR tn149 – Gueiren, Datan, THSR Tainan Station	
Tainan City	Gueiren	16.9	10.5	16	Gueiren	Cty 182 – Gueiren, Guanmiao	
Tainan City	Guanmiao	18.9	11.7	18	-	Prov 19a	End Freeway
Tainan City	Guanmiao	20.0	12.4	20	Guanmiao	Nat 3 – Xinhua, Tianliao	
Tainan City	1.000 mi = 1.609 km; 1.000 km = 0.621 mi: Incomplete access						

== Major Cities Along the Route ==
- Tainan City

== Intersections with other Freeways and Expressways ==
- National Highway No. 1 at Rende JCT. in Rende, Tainan
- National Highway No. 3 at Guanmiao IC. in Guanmiao, Tainan

== See also ==
- Highway system in Taiwan

== Notes ==
The highway has been completed as of December 15, 2013.
