= Provincial Highway 22 (Taiwan) =

Provincial highway in Taiwan

Provincial Highway 22
- 台22線
- Qinan Highway

Route information
- Maintained by Directorate General of Highways
- Length: 34.321 km (21.326 mi)

Major junctions
- West end: Prov 1 in Nanzih District, Kaohsiung City
- Nat 1 in Nanzih; Nat 10 in Yanchao
- East end: Prov 27 in Gaoshu, Pingtung

Location
- Country: Taiwan

Highway system
- Highway system in Taiwan
← Prov 21	→ Prov 23

Provincial Highway 22 (Chinese: 台22線) is a highway that started from Nanzih District, just north of downtown Kaohsiung, and ended in Gaoshu, Pingtung County. The highway passes through Dashe, Yanchao, and Cishan in Kaohsiung City, and Ligang in Pingtung County. The highway is known as Qinan Highway (旗楠公路) for the stretch between Cishan and Nanzih. The route length is 34.321 km.

== See also ==
- Highway system in Taiwan
