= National Freeway 3 =

Highway in Taiwan

Coordinates: 24°5′50″N 120°36′0″E

National freeway 3
- Formosa Freeway (福爾摩沙高速公路)

Route information
- Maintained by Taiwan Area National Freeway Bureau
- Length: 430.5 km (267.5 mi)
- Existed: 19 January 1993–present

Major junctions
- North end: Prov 2 in Keelung
- Nat 1 in Xizhi; Nat 5 in Nangang; Nat 2 in Yingge; Nat 1 in Baoshan; Nat 4 in Qingshui; Nat 1 in Changhua; Nat 6 in Wufeng; Nat 8 in Xinhua; Nat 10 in Yanchao
- South end: Dapengwan National Scenic Area in Linbian

Location
- Country: Taiwan
- Counties: Keelung, New Taipei, Taipei, Taoyuan, Hsinchu, Miaoli, Taichung, Changhua, Nantou, Yunlin, Chiayi, Tainan, Kaohsiung, Pingtung

Highway system
- Transport in Taiwan
← Nat 2	→ Nat 4

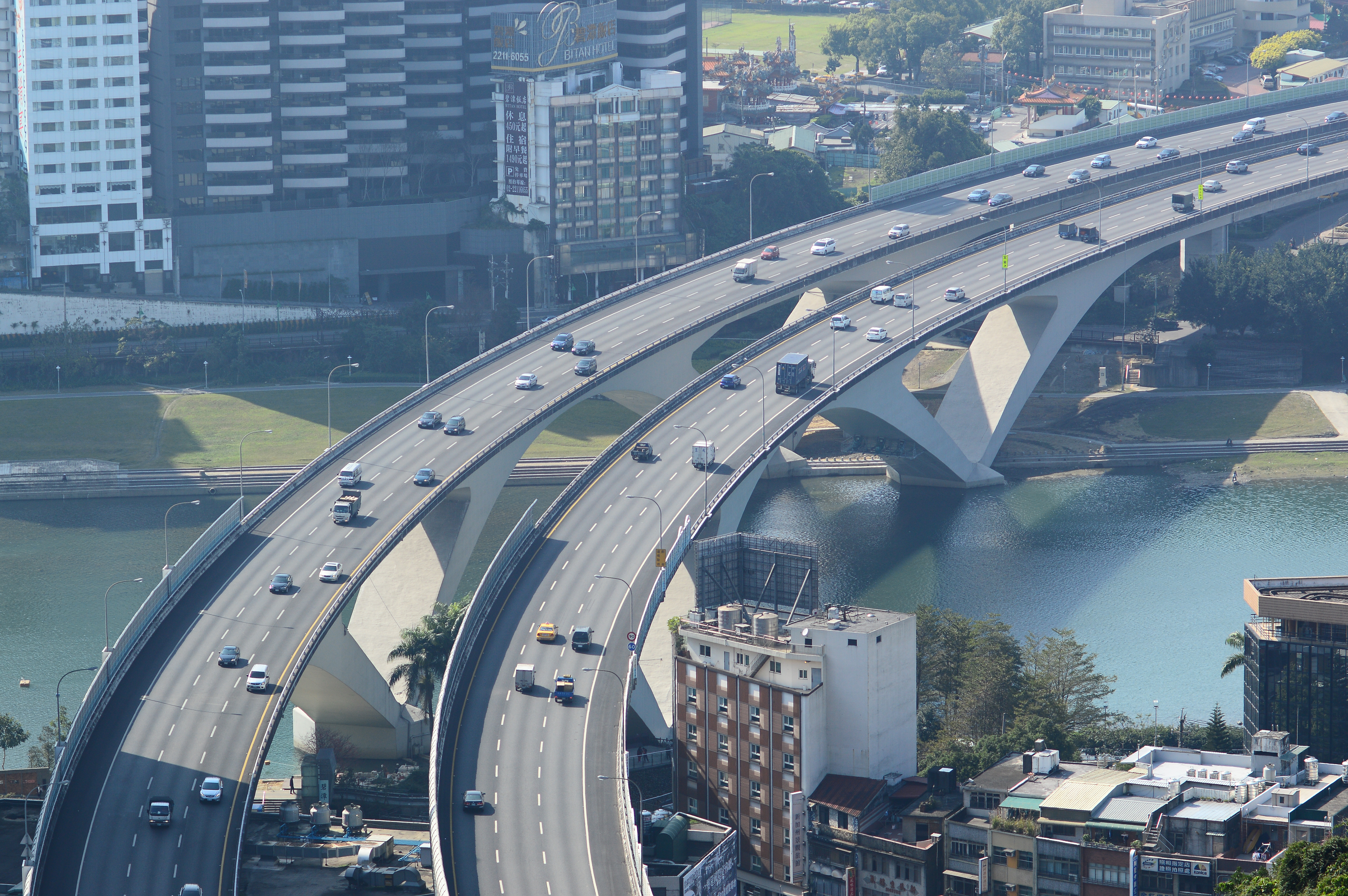
Formosa Freeway Bitan Bridge

National Freeway 3 (Chinese: 國道三號; pinyin: Guódào sān hào), also known as Formosa Freeway (Chinese: 福爾摩沙高速公路; pinyin: Fúěrmóshā gāosù gōnglù), is a freeway in Taiwan. It is the second north–south freeway in Taiwan, beginning in Keelung City at Jijin Interchange on the provincial highway 2 (Jijin Road) and ending in Linbian, Pingtung on the provincial highway 17. It is the longest freeway in Taiwan with a total length of 431.5 km (268.1 mi). The freeway also has a spur route, Freeway 3A.

The highway has 58 interchanges, 15 junctions, 7 service areas and 3 rest areas en route. Aside from the 58 public interchanges, there are also some interchanges reserved for governmental usage.

== Route Description ==
This freeway mostly serves as a bypass to major cities in Western Taiwan, traveling through suburban and rural areas. However, Freeway 3 is also the primary freeway in the counties of Nantou and Pingtung, as well as the first ever being built in these counties. Various expressways and east–west freeways link Freeway 3 with urban areas typically served by Freeway 1. The purposes of this freeway are to increase economic development in rural areas and to relieve congestion along Freeway 1.

The freeway begins at an intersection with Provincial Highway 2 (Chinese: 臺二線) and Provincial Highway 2F (Chinese: 臺二己線) in Keelung. Highway 2F, also known as Port of Keelung Western Connector (Chinese: 基隆港西岸聯外道路), is an elevated road that connects the Port of Keelung with Freeway 3. The freeway travels in a northeast–southwest direction through the western part of Keelung before intersecting Freeway 1 in Xizhi. The freeway then travels along the mountains of New Taipei City and Taipei, bypassing the southeastern and southern edge of the Taipei metropolitan area. Connections to downtown Taipei are available through Huandong Blvd (Chinese: 環東大道) in Nangang and Freeway 3A in Wenshan. In Nangang, the freeway intersects National Freeway 5, which travels through the Xueshan Range before reaching Yilan County in Eastern Taiwan. In Yingge, the freeway meets National Freeway 2 which provides connections to downtown Taoyuan as well as Taipei's main international airport, Taoyuan International Airport. In Taoyuan, the freeway is mostly parallel to Provincial Highway 3, traveling through the mountainous areas of the city. As the freeway enters Hsinchu County it turns to a slightly east–west direction before intersecting Freeway 1 for the second time at the border of Hsinchu county and Hsinchu city. This stretch of the freeway is also known as the Northern Second Freeway (Chinese: 北部第二高速公路, 北二高).

In Miaoli County the freeway mostly parallels Freeway 1 and Provincial Highway 61 (also known as West Coast expressway, Chinese: 西濱快速道路) all the way to Taichung. In Taichung, the freeway intersects with National Freeway 4 just north of Taichung International Airport. The stretch from Freeway 4 to Provincial Highway 74 (Kuaiguan-Wufeng expressway, Chinese: 快官霧峰線) forms the western and southern portion of the Taichung Beltway (Chinese: 臺中環線). After entering Changhua County the freeway turns into a northwest–southeast direction heading towards Nantou County, intersecting Freeway 1 for the third and final time in Changhua. Before entering Nantou City the freeway meets National Freeway 6, which connects to the mountainous town of Puli and the Central Mountain Range. In Nantou, the freeway mostly travels in a north–south direction before exiting to Yunlin County, where it travels in a slight northeast–southwest direction again along Yunlin and parallels Freeway 1. This stretch of the freeway from Hsinchu to the intersection of Provincial Highway 78 (Taiwan) in Gukeng, Yunlin is also known as the Central Second Highway (Chinese: 中部第二高速公路, 中二高).

The highway continues to parallel Freeway 1 as it travels along the eastern parts of Chiayi County and Tainan. Provincinal highways 82, 84, and 86 as well as National Freeway 8 provide connections between Freeways 1 and 3. In Kaohsiung the freeway bypasses the downtown area and travels along the mountainous rural districts. Connections to downtown and Kaohsiung International Airport are available through National Freeway 10, which the freeway intersects in the rural district of Yanchao, as well as Provincial Highway 88 in the urban township of Chaozhou in Pingtung County. After passing through the intersection with Freeway 10, the freeway enters Pingtung and ends in Dapengwan National Scenic Area in the rural township of Linbian. The southern stretch of the highway is known as the Southern Second Highway (Chinese: 南部第二高速公路, 南二高).

== Naming ==
Freeways in Taiwan are officially coded "Freeways" with their respective numbers. By this principle, national freeway 3 is coded Freeway No. 3 (國道三號) in official documents or on road signs. Besides the numeric name, on November 1, 2004, it was named the Formosa Freeway (福爾摩沙高速公路) in a naming competition; however, its old alias Second Freeway (第二高速公路 or 二高) is more popular among the road users.

== History ==
The original plan was only intended to build a second freeway between Taipei and Hsinchu. The construction began in 1987. Tucheng IC - Sanying IC was opened in January 1993, followed by Zhonghe IC to Hsinchu SIC in August 1993. Extension from Hsinchu SIC to Xiangshan IC was finished in February 1996. In March 1996, Xizhi SIC - Muzha IC was opened. The final phase of the north section was Muzha IC. - Zhonghe IC, which was completed in August 1997. The extension between Xizhi SIC and Jijin IC completed in August 2000.

The construction of the freeway south of Hsinchu City began in 1993. In February 2000, Xinhua JCT. - Jiuru IC. was open for the traffic. It was followed by Douliu IC - Xinhua JCT. In November 2001, Xiangshan IC. - Zhunan IC in December 2001, Zhunan IC - Houlong IC in May 2002, Caotun IC - Douliu IC in June 2002, Zhonggang SIC - Longjing IC in October 2002, and Houlong IC - Zhonggang JCT., Kuaiguan IC - Caotun IC in January 2003. The entire project was completed in January 2004 when Longjing IC - Kuaiguan IC was opened.

== 2010 landslide ==
On 25 April 2010, a landslide occurred on a segment near Xizhi. A large amount of dirt buried both directions of the freeway. Four cars were buried under the debris, killing four people. Bad hillside anchoring was blamed as a possible cause, as it had not been raining at the time of the collapse and an earthquake was not registered.

Repairs to the freeway were completed on 19 June 2010 and normal traffic flow restored.

== Exit list ==
County	Location	km	mi	Exit	Name	Destinations	Notes
Keelung City	Anle District	0.0	0.0	0	Jijin	Prov 2 / Prov 2F – Keelung, Wanli	Northbound exit and southbound entrance
Keelung City	Anle District			Keelung Tunnel			
Keelung City	Qidu District	2.4	1.5	2	Madong System	Prov 62 – Ruifang, Dapu	
New Taipei City	Xizhi	10.9	6.8	10	Xizhi System	Nat 1 – Xizhi, Wudu, Neihu	
New Taipei City	Xizhi	12.2	7.6	12	Xintai 5th Road	Prov 5 – Xizhi, Nangang	
New Taipei City	Xizhi	14.9	9.3	14	Nangang	Huandong Blvd., Nangang	
Taipei City	Nangang	16.4	10.2	16	Nangang System	Nat 5 – Shiding, Yilan	
Taipei City	Nangang	16.7	10.4	16	Nanshen Rd.	Nanshen Rd.	Northbound entrance only
Taipei City	Wenshan	20.7	12.9	20	Muzha	Nat 3a – Muzha, Taipei, Shenkeng	
Taipei City	Wenshan	25	16	Muzha Rest Stop (Northbound access only)			
New Taipei City	Xindian	26.8	16.7	26	Xindian	Zhongxing Rd. – Xindian	
New Taipei City	Xindian	31.1	19.3	31	Ankeng	Cty 110 – Ankeng, Xindian, Taipei	
New Taipei City	Zhonghe	35.8	22.2	35	Zhonghe	Prov 64 – Zhonghe, Banqiao	
New Taipei City	Tucheng	42.8	26.6	42	Tucheng	Prov 65 / Prov 3 – Tucheng, Banqiao	
New Taipei City	Sanxia	50	31	50	Sanying	Cty 110 – Sanxia, Yingge	
New Taipei City	Yingge	54.6	33.9	54	Yingge System	Nat 2 – Taiwan Taoyuan International Airport, Bade	
Taoyuan City	Daxi	62.7	39.0	62	Daxi	Prov 66 / Prov 3 – Cihu Mausoleum, Daxi, Zhongli, Pingzhen	
Taoyuan City	Longtan	68.4	42.5	68	Longtan	Cty 113B – Longtan	
Hsinchu County	Guanxi	76.8	47.7	Guanxi Service Area			
Hsinchu County	Guanxi	79.4	49.3	79	Guanxi	Cty 118 – Guanxi, Xinpu	
Hsinchu County	Qionglin	90.6	56.3	90	Zhulin	Cty 120 – Zhudong, Qionglin	
Hsinchu County	Baoshan	96.2	59.8	Baoshan Rest Area (Southbound access only)			
Hsinchu County	Baoshan	98.7	61.3	98	Baoshan	Sanfeng Rd., Daya Rd. – Baoshan, Hsinchu Science and Industrial Park	
Hsinchu County	Baoshan	100.5	62.4	100	Hsinchu System	Nat 1 – Hsinchu, Toufen	
Hsinchu City	Xiangshan District	103.0	64.0	103	Jiadong	Cty 117 – Hsinchu	
Hsinchu City	Xiangshan District	109.6	68.1	109	Xiangshan	Prov 1 / Prov 13 – Xiangshan, Toufen, Zhunan	
Miaoli County	Zhunan	115.2	71.6	115	Xibin	Prov 61	
Miaoli County	Zhunan	119.3	74.1	119	Zhunan	Prov 1F / Prov 61 – Zhunan	
Miaoli County	Houlong	124.9	77.6	124	Dashan	Zaoqiao, Dashan	
Miaoli County	Houlong	130.9	81.3	130	Houlong	Prov 6 – Houlong, Miaoli	
Miaoli County	Xihu	134.3	83.5	Xihu Service Area			
Miaoli County	Tongxiao	144.5	89.8	144	Tongxiao	Cty 128 – Tongluo, Tongxiao	
Miaoli County	Yuanli	156.8	97.4	156	Yuanli	Cty 140 – Sanyi, Yuanli	
Taichung City	Waipu	164.2	102.0	164	Dajia	Cty 132 – Waipu, Dajia	
Taichung City	Qingshui	169.4	105.3	169	Zhonggang System	Nat 4 – Shengang, Qingshui	
Taichung City	Qingshui	172.5	107.2	Qingshui Service Area			
Taichung City	Shalu	176.1	109.4	176	Shalu	Prov 10 – Daya, Shalu	
Taichung City	Longjing	182.7	113.5	182	Longjing	Cty 136 – Longjing, Taichung	
Changhua County	Hemei	191.5	119.0	191	Hemei	Prov 61B / Cty 134a – Hemei, Shengang	
Changhua County	Changhua	196.8	122.3	196	Changhua System	Nat 1 – Taichung, Changhua	
Changhua County	Changhua	202.5	125.8	202	Kuaiguan	Prov 74 / Prov 74a – Taichung, Changhua	
Taichung City	Wuri	207.6	129.0	207	Wuri	Cty 127 – Wuri	
Taichung City	Wufeng	209.3	130.1	209	Zhongtou	Prov 63 – Dali, Taichung	
Taichung City	Wufeng	211.5	131.4	211	Wufeng	Prov 74 / Prov 3 – Wufeng	
Taichung City	Wufeng	214.2	133.1	214	Wufeng System	Nat 6 – Guoxing, Puli	
Nantou County	Caotun	217.5	135.1	217	Caotun	Prov 14 – Caotun, Fenyuan	
Nantou County	Caotun	222.7	138.4	222	Zhongxing System	Prov 76 – Yuanlin	
Nantou County	Caotun	224.9	139.7	224	Zhongxing	Prov 3 / Prov 14B – Nantou, Zhongxing New Village	
Nantou County	Nantou	228	142	228	Nantou	Prov 3a – Nantou, Zhongliao	
Nantou County	Nantou	231.3	143.7	Nantou Service Area			
Nantou County	Mingjian	237	147	237	Mingjian	Prov 3 – Mingjian, Jiji	
Nantou County	Zhushan	243.6	151.4	243	Zhushan	Prov 3 – Zhushan, Lugu	
Yunlin County	Douliu	260	160	260	Douliu	Prov 3 – Douliu, Linnei	
Yunlin County	Gukeng	269.3	167.3	269	Gukeng System	Prov 78 – Gukeng, Douliu	
Yunlin County	Gukeng	276.8	172.0	Gukeng Service Area			
Chiayi County	Dalin	279.6	173.7	279	Meishan	Cty 162 – Meishan, Dalin	
Chiayi County	Zhuqi	290	180	290	Zhuqi	Cty 159 / Cty 166 – Zhuqi, Minxiong, Chiayi	
Chiayi County	Zhongpu	297.6	184.9	297	Zhongpu	Prov 18 – Zhongpu, Chiayi	
Chiayi County	Shuishang	300.9	187.0	300	Shuishang System	Prov 82 – Shuishang	
Tainan City	Baihe	311.6	193.6	311	Baihe	Cty 172 – Dongshan, Baihe	
Tainan City	Dongshan	319	198	Dongshan Service Area			
Tainan City	Liouying	322	200	322	Liuying	Cty 165 – City Road 110, Dongshan, Liouying	
Tainan City	Lioujia	329.7	204.9	329	Wushantou	City Road 116, CR 165, Guantian, Lioujia	
Tainan City	Guantian	334.9	208.1	334	Guantian System	Prov 84 – Guantian, Yujing, Danei	
Tainan City	Shanhua	340.2	211.4	340	Shanhua	Cty 178 – Shanhua, Shanshang	
Tainan City	Xinhua	346.9	215.6	346	Xinhua System	Nat 8 – Xinhua, Tainan	
Tainan City	Xinhua	350	220	Xinhua Rest Area			
Tainan City	Guanmiao	357	222	357	Guanmiao	Prov 86 / Prov 19a – Guanmiao, Gueiren	
Tainan City	Guanmiao	363	226	Guanmiao Service Area			
Kaohsiung City	Tianliao	369.5	229.6	369	Tianliao	Prov 28 – Tianliao, Alian	
Kaohsiung City	Yanchao	383	238	383	Yanchao System	Nat 10 – Cishan, Kaohsiung	
Pingtung County	Jiuru	391.6	243.3	391	Jiuru	Prov 3 – Jiuru, Ligang, Pingtung	
Pingtung County	Changzhi	396.0	246.1	396	Pingtung	Prov 27 – Yanpu, Pingtung	Southbound exit and northbound entrance
Pingtung County	Changzhi	400.2	248.7	400	Changzhi	Prov 24 – Changzhi, Sandimen	
Pingtung County	Linluo	407.3	253.1	407	Linluo	Prov 1 – Linluo, Neipu, Pingtung	
Pingtung County	Zhutian	415.2	258.0	415	Zhutian System	Prov 88 – Zhutian, Kaohsiung	
Pingtung County	Kanding	421.2	261.7	421	Kanding	Kanding	Southbound exit and northbound entrance
Pingtung County	Nanzhou	424.5	263.8	424	Nanzhou	Cty 187B – Nanzhou, Xinpi	
Pingtung County	Linbian	430.5	267.5	430	Linbian	Prov 17 – Linbian, Donggang	
Pingtung County	Linbian	431.5	268.1	431	Dapengwan End	Dapengwan National Scenic Area	
1.000 mi = 1.609 km; 1.000 km = 0.621 mi: Incomplete access

== Major cities along the route ==
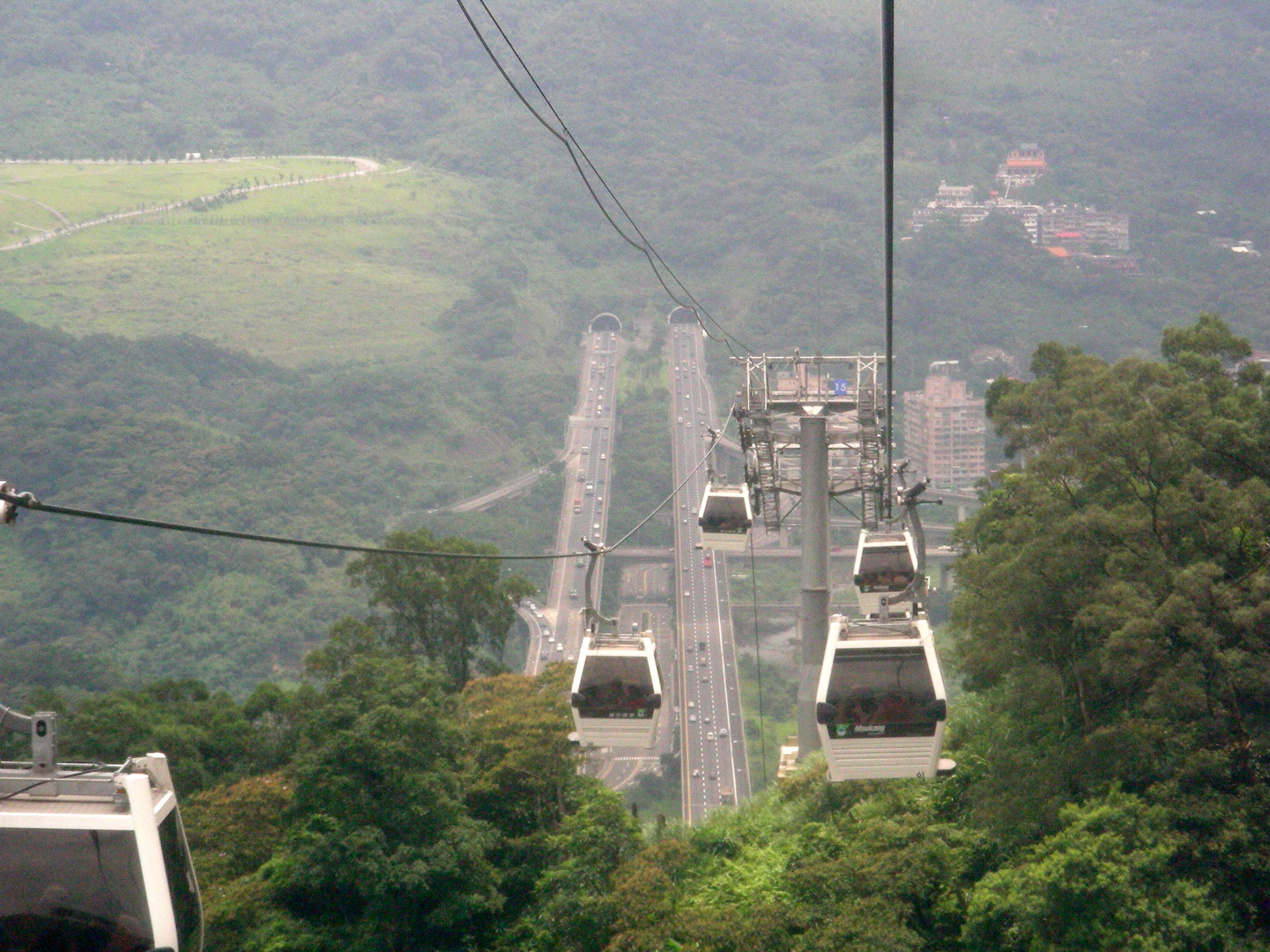
Muzha IC and Maokong Gondola in Taipei.

- Keelung City
- New Taipei City
- Taipei City
- Hsinchu City
- Taichung City
- Changhua City
- Nantou City
- Douliu City

== Intersections with other freeways and expressways ==
- Provincial Highway No. 62 at Madong JCT. in Keelung City
- Freeway No. 1 at Xizhi JCT. in New Taipei City
- Provincial Highway No. 5 at Nangang IC. in New Taipei City
- Freeway No. 5 at Nangang JCT. in Taipei City
- Freeway No. 3A at Muzha IC. in Taipei City
- Provincial Highway No. 64 at Zhonghe IC. in New Taipei City
- Freeway No. 2 at Yingge JCT. in New Taipei City
- Provincial Highway No. 66 at Daxi IC. in Taoyuan City
- Freeway No. 1 at Hsinchu JCT. in Baoshan, Hsinchu
- Provincial Highway No. 61 at Xibin IC. in Zhunan, Miaoli
- Freeway No. 4 at Zhonggang JCT. in Taichung City
- Freeway No. 1 at Changhua JCT. in Changhua City
- Provincial Highway No. 74 at Kuaiguan IC. in Changhua City
- Provincial Highway No. 63 at Zhongtou IC. in Taichung City
- Freeway No. 6 at Zhongheng JCT. in Taichung City
- Provincial Highway No. 76 at Zhongxing JCT. in Caotun, Nantou
- Provincial Highway No. 78 at Gukeng JCT. in Gukeng, Yunlin
- Provincial Highway No. 82 at Shuishang JCT. in Shuishang, Chiayi
- Provincial Highway No. 84 at Guantian JCT. in Tainan City
- Freeway No. 8 at Xinhua JCT. in Tainan City
- Provincial Highway No. 86 at Guanmiao IC. in Tainan City
- Freeway No. 10 at Yanchao JCT. in Kaohsiung City
- Provincial Highway No. 88 at Zhutian JCT. in Zhutian, Pingtung

== Lanes ==
The lanes in each direction are listed below.

- 4 lanes:
  - Zhonghe IC. - Yingge JCT.
  - Wufeng IC. - Nantou IC.
- 3 lanes:
  - Jijin IC. - Zhonghe IC.
  - Yingge JCT. - Wufeng IC.
  - Nantou IC. - Jiuru IC.
- 2 lanes:
  - Jiuru IC. - Linbian End

== Spur routes ==
Freeway 3A (Taipei)

== See also ==
- Highway system in Taiwan
