= Provincial Highway 17 (Taiwan) =

Road in Taiwan

Provincial Highway 17
- 台17線
- Western Coastal Highway

Route information
- Maintained by Directorate General of Highways
- Length: 273.474 km (169.929 mi)

Major junctions
- North end: Prov 1 in Qingshui, Taichung City
- Nat 4 in Qingshui; Nat 1 in Kaohsiung; Nat 3 in Linbian
- South end: Prov 1 in Fangliao, Pingtung

Location
- Country: Taiwan

Highway system
- Highway system in Taiwan
← Prov 16	→ Prov 18

Provincial Highway 17 (PH 17), Chinese: 台17線) is a north–south highway from Qingshui in Taichung City to Fangliao in Pingtung County. The highway is known as Western Coastal Highway (西部濱海公路) since it runs parallel to the western coasts of Taiwan. Since the completion of PH 61 expressway, which parallels PH 17, the latter now mostly handles local traffic. The total length of the highway is 273.474 kilometres (169.929 mi).

== Route description ==
The highway begins at the intersection of PH 1 in Qingshui. PH 1 turns slightly towards inland and PH 17 continues along the coast. PH 17 runs parallel with PH 61 (Xibin Expressway), and shares concurrency with the latter from Dacheng in Changhua County to Mailiao in Yunlin county, from Dongshi to Taixi in Yunlin County, and from Kouhu in Yunlin County to Dongshi in Chiayi County.

In Qingshui the highway intersects Freeway 4, which provides connection to the inland districts in Taichung City. The highway also intersects PH 78 in Taixi and PH 82 in Dongshi; both are expressways connecting to the more populated inland areas in Yunlin and Chiayi. In Tainan City the highway intersects PH 84 in Beimen and PH 86 just south of the central area of the city. The highway also passes through the terminus of Sun Yat-Sen Freeway in downtown Kaohsiung City. The highway ends at Fangliao at the intersection of PH 1.

The highway passes through the following counties and cities: Taichung City, Changhua County, Yunlin County, Chiayi County, Tainan City, Kaohsiung City, and Pingtung County.

== Spur routes ==
- Prov 17a: The highway connects Freeway 8 in Annan, Tainan City with the parent route in Hunei, Kaohsiung City. The total length is 26.418 km.
- Prov 17b: The highway connects its parent route with Highway 17a in Annan, Tainan City. The total length is 5.917 km.

== See also ==
- Highway system in Taiwan
