= National Freeway 8 =

Road in Taiwan

National freeway 8
- Tainan Branch

Route information
- Maintained by Taiwan Area National Freeway Bureau
- Length: 15.5 km (9.6 mi)
- Existed: 16 August 1999–present

Major junctions
- West end: Prov 17A in Annan
- Nat 1 in Sinshih; Nat 3 in Sinhua
- East end: Prov 20 in Sinhua

Location
- Country: Taiwan

Highway system
- Highway system in Taiwan
← Nat 7	→ Nat 10

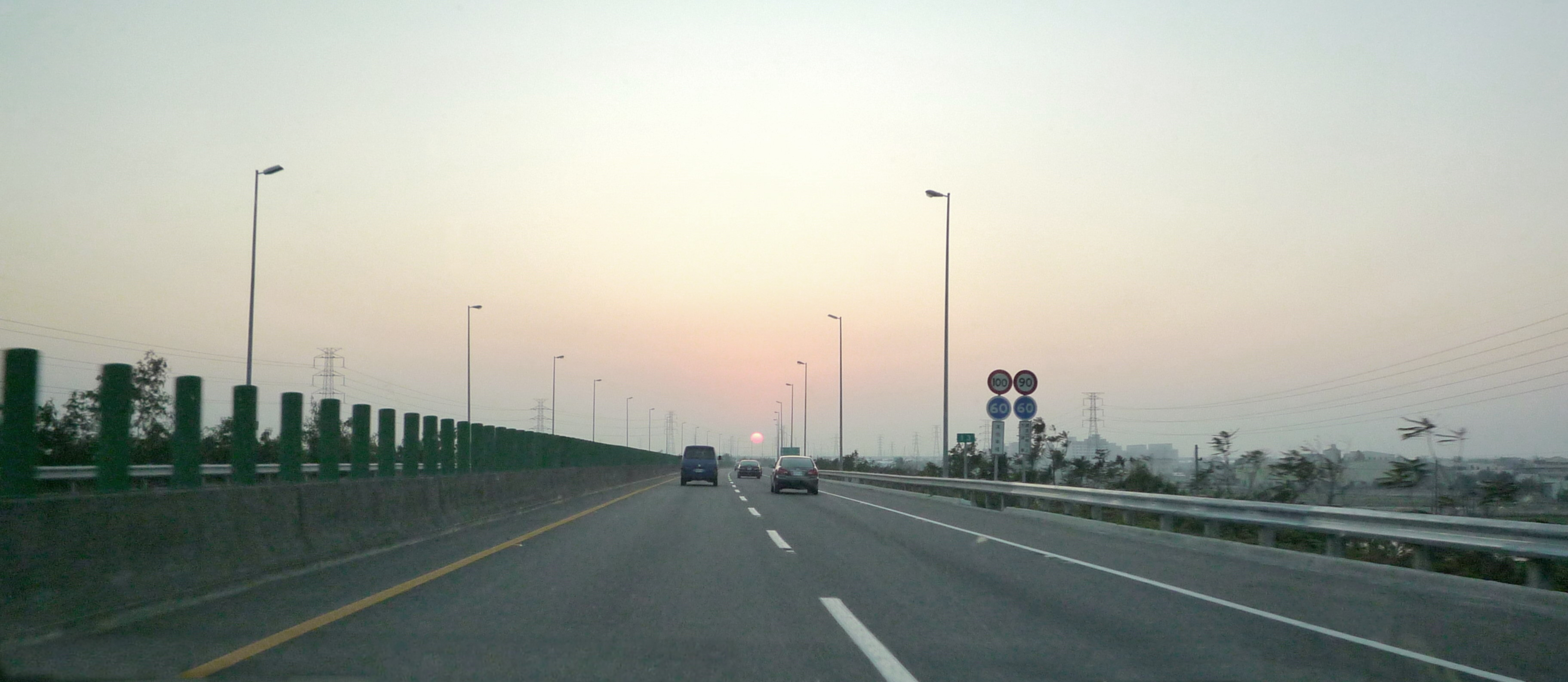
National freeway 8

National freeway 8 is a freeway, which begins in Annan District of Tainan City and ends in Sinhua District, Tainan on the provincial highway 20. The first 4.2 kilometres of the freeway (from provincial highway 17A to Tainan district road 133) is expressway-standard road with partial controlled access, while the rest is controlled-access highway.

== Length ==
The total length is 15.5 km (9.6 miles).

== Major cities along the route ==
- Tainan City

== Exit List ==
County	Location	km	mi	Exit	Name	Destinations	Notes
Tainan City	Annan	0.0	0.0	0	Tainan Top	Prov 17a – Downtown Tainan, Taijiang National Park, Tainan Technology Park	
Tainan City	Anding	2.4	1.5	2	Xinji	Prov 19 – Annan, Sigang	Westbound exit and eastbound entrance
Tainan City	Sinshih	6.5	4.0	6	Tainan System	Nat 1 – Taichung, Tainan	
Tainan City	Sinshih	9.7	6.0	9	Xinshi	Prov 1 – Yongkang, Sinshih, Tainan Science Park	
Tainan City	Sinhua	14.6	9.1	14	Xinhua System	Nat 3 – Pingtung, Douliu	
Tainan City	Sinhua	15.5	9.6	15	Xinhua	Prov 20 – Sinhua, Shanshang, Zuozheng	
1.000 mi = 1.609 km; 1.000 km = 0.621 mi: Incomplete access

== Lanes ==
The lanes in each direction are listed below.

- 2 lanes:
  - Tainan Top - Xinhua End

== See also ==
- Highway system in Taiwan

== Notes ==
Completed in 1999.
