= National Freeway 10 =

Road in Taiwan

National freeway 10
- Kaohsiung Branch

Route information
- Maintained by Taiwan Area National Freeway Bureau
- Length: 33.8 km (21.0 mi)
- Existed: 14 November 1999–present

Major junctions
- West end: Kaohsiung Metro Expressway in Zuoying District, Kaohsiung
- Nat 1 in Renwu; Nat 3 in Yanchao
- East end: Prov 3 in Cishan

Location
- Country: Taiwan

Highway system
- Highway system in Taiwan
| ← Nat 8 | → Nat 1 |

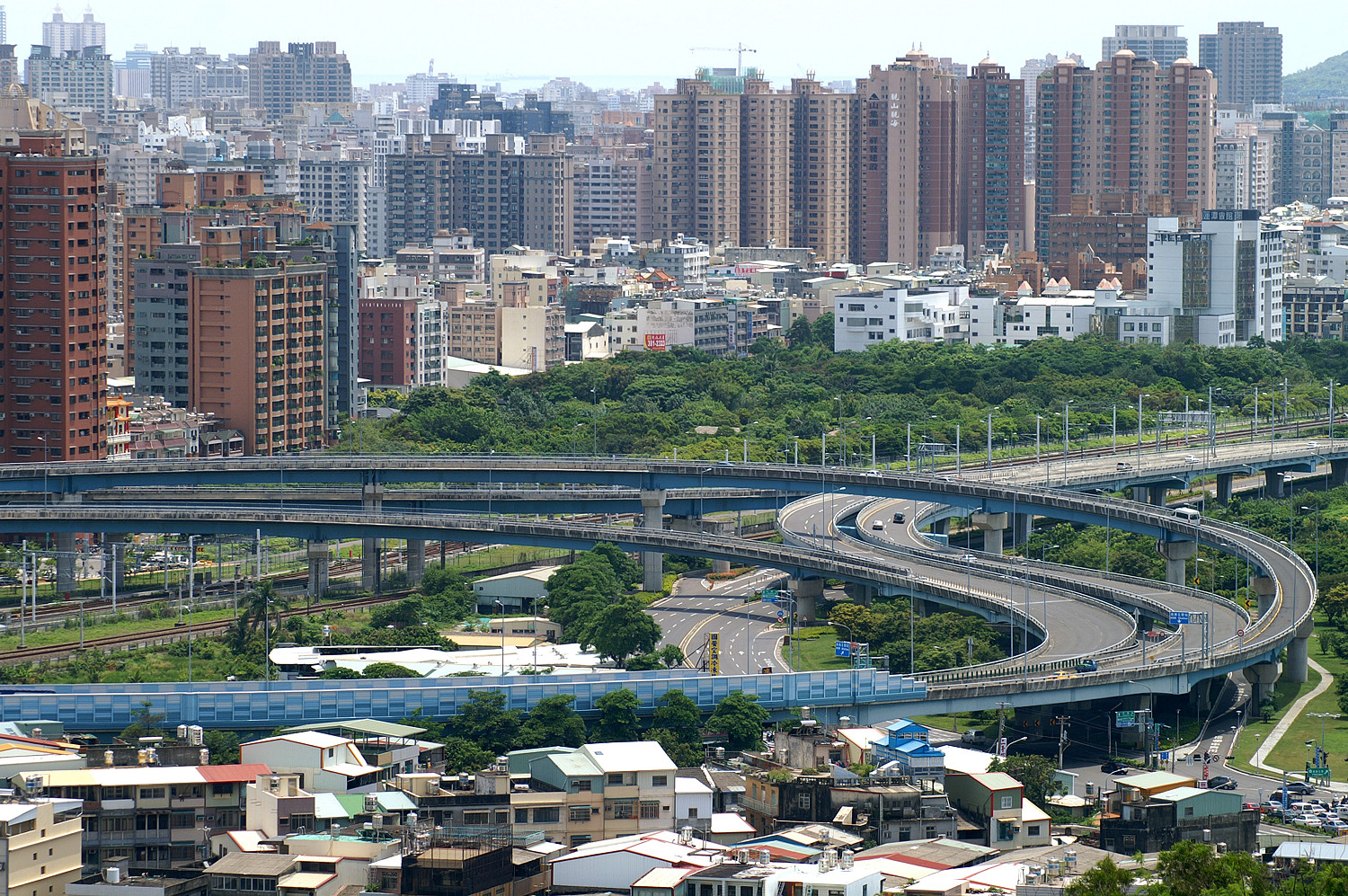
National freeway 10

National Freeway 10 (Chinese: 國道10號) is a freeway in Taiwan which begins in downtown Kaohsiung City at the intersection of Dajhong Road and Wunzih Road and ends in Cishan on the provincial highway 3.

== Length ==
The total length is 33.8 km (21 miles).

== Major cities along the route ==
- Kaohsiung City

== Exit List ==
| County | Location | km | mi | Exit | Name | Destinations | Notes |
|---|---|---|---|---|---|---|---|
| Kaohsiung City | Zuoying | 0.0 | 0.0 | 0 | Zuoying Top | Ziyou Road, Bo'ai Road | Freeway continues as Kaohsiung Metro Expressway |
| Kaohsiung City | Renwu | 1.9 | 1.2 | 1 | Dingjin System | Nat 1 – Kaohsiung, Tainan | |
| Kaohsiung City | Renwu | 6.7 | 4.2 | 6 | Renwu | Cty 186 – Renwu, Dashu | |
| Kaohsiung City | Yanchao | 13 | 8.1 | 13 | Yanchao | Prov 22 – Yanchao | |
| Kaohsiung City | Yanchao | 19.7 | 12.2 | 19 | Yanchao System | Nat 3 – Pingtung, Tainan | |
| Kaohsiung City | Cishan | 22.6 | 14.0 | 22 | Lingkou | Prov 29 – Cishan, Dashu | Eastbound exit and westbound entrance |
| Pingtung County | Ligang | 25.1 | 15.6 | 25 | Ligang | Prov 3 – Ligang | Eastbound exit and westbound entrance |
| Kaohsiung City | Cishan | 33.7 | 20.9 | 33 | Qishan End | Prov 3 – Cishan, Meinong, Ligang | |
1.000 mi = 1.609 km; 1.000 km = 0.621 mi

== Lanes ==
The lanes in each direction are listed below.

- 2 lanes:
  - Zuoying Terminus - Dingjin JCT.
  - Yanchao JCT. - Qishan Terminus.
- 3 lanes:
  - Dingjin JCT. - Yanchao JCT.

== See also ==
- Highway system in Taiwan
