= Speed limits in Taiwan =

The Act Governing the Punishment of Violation of Road traffic Regulations (道路交通管理處罰條例) is the basic law governing speed limit in Taiwan (Republic of China). The Road Traffic Security Rules (道路交通安全規則) are the basic administrative regulations. When no other limits are posted, the default speed limits are:

- 15 km/h (9.3 mph) when approaching a railroad crossing.
- 40 km/h (25 mph) on roads without lane markings or on slow lanes (Chinese: 慢車道) separated by single solid white lines from nearby fast lanes (Chinese: 快車道).
- 50 km/h (31 mph) on other roads and lanes.

Speed limits on freeways are posted by signs, generally 100 km/h (62 mph). Limited segments are posted at 90, 80, or 70 km/h (56, 50, or 43 mph). Most segments of the National Highway No. 3 are now posted at 110 km/h (68 mph), the highest speed limit in Taiwan. A truck with a gross weight of 20 tonnes or more is limited to 90 km/h (56 mph). Except on approaches to toll stations and work areas, minimum speeds are usually posted at 60 km/h (37 mph).
