= Freeway 7 =

Freeway 7 may refer to:

- A7 motorway (Greece)
- Freeway 7 (Iran)
- Freeway 7 (Taiwan)
