= National Freeway 5 =

Road in Taiwan

National freeway 5
- Chiang Wei-shui Memorial Freeway

Route information
- Maintained by Taiwan Area National Freeway Bureau
- Length: 54.3 km (33.7 mi)
- Existed: 16 June 2006–present

Location
- Country: Taiwan
- Counties: Taipei, Yilan

Highway system
- Highway system in Taiwan
| ← Nat 4 | → Nat 6 |

National freeway 5 (Chinese: 中華民國國道五號) is a freeway in Taiwan, which begins in Taipei City at Nangang Junction on National freeway 3 and ends in Su-ao, Yilan on Masai Road. Although it was called the Beiyi Freeway (Chinese abbreviation for Taipei to Yilan) prior to its final completion in June 2006, the official name is the Chiang Wei-shui Memorial Freeway (蔣渭水高速公路), after the early twentieth century Taiwanese political activist and Yilan native Chiang Wei-shui.

== Major cities along the route ==
- Taipei City
- New Taipei City (although this route passes through the mountainous area)
- Yilan City

== Intersections with other freeways and expressways ==
- National freeway 3 at Nangang JCT. in Taipei City

== Lanes ==
The lanes in each direction are listed below.

- 2 lanes:
  - Nangang Junction – Su-ao Interchange

== Traffic rules ==
The speed limit in the Hsuehshan Tunnel section is 90 km/h.

The separation distance is 50 m.

== Toll Stations ==
Only a toll station named and located in Toucheng, Yilan County is now active. Other toll stations on interchanges are not working until fare changed to based on mileages.

As of July 2008, Toucheng Toll Station has started ETC service.

== Exit list ==
| County | Location | km | mi | Exit | Name | Destinations | Notes |
|---|---|---|---|---|---|---|---|
| Taipei City | Nangang | 0.0 | 0.0 | 0 | Nangang System | Nat 3 – Xizhi, Muzha, Xindian | |
| New Taipei City | Shiding | 4.0 | 2.5 | 4 | Shiding | Cty 106 / Cty 106B – Shiding, Shenkeng | Shiding Service Area is accessed off CR 106B |
| New Taipei City | Pinglin | 14.7 | 9.1 | 14 | Pinglin | Pinglin | |
| New Taipei City, Yilan County | Pinglin, Toucheng | 15.3– 28.3 | 9.5– 17.6 | Hsuehshan Tunnel | | | |
| Yilan | Toucheng | 29.7 | 18.5 | 30 | Toucheng | Prov 2G / Prov 9 – Toucheng, Jiaoxi | |
| Yilan | Jiaoxi, Zhuangwei, Yilan | 36.2– 41.1 | 22.5– 25.5 | 38 | Yilan | Cty 191A to Prov 7 / Cty 191 / Cty 192 – Zhuangwei, Yilan | |
| Yilan | Wujie, Luodong | 45.5– 47.8 | 28.3– 29.7 | 47 | Luodong | Cty 191A to Cty 196 – Wujie, Luodong | |
| Yilan | Suao | 54.3 | 33.7 | 54 | Suao | To Prov 2 / Prov 9 – Suao, Dongshan | |
1.000 mi = 1.609 km; 1.000 km = 0.621 mi

== Notes ==
The section between Toucheng Township and Suao Township of Yilan County was completed in January 2006.

Hsuehshan Tunnel between Pinglin, Taipei and Toucheng, Yilan is 12.9 km long. It is the fifth longest road tunnel in the world.

Extension to Hualien City is planned, but the construction is suspended due to environmental concerns.

Pinglin IC located in Taipei water preservation area, is temporarily opened before the Hsuehshan Tunnel completed. It will not open to public due to environmental protection issues. The water on the freeway is collected by the water processing plant to prevent polluting the preservation area.

== Su-Hua Freeway ==
Su-Hua Freeway (蘇花高速公路) is a future freeway project executed by Taiwan Area National Expressway Engineering Bureau. It will be constructed between Su-ao, Yilan and Ji-an, Hualien. It may cost over 100 billion New Taiwan dollars to build. Due to environmental protection issues, this project is temporarily suspended. The next item will be Hua-dong Freeway and South Link Freeway.

=== Realignment of Su-Hua Highway ===
In 2008, a realignment of the Su-Hua Highway was suggested, which was named "Suhuati." It would be between Nan-ao, Yilan and Heping, Hualien, and would cost approximately NT$30 billion to build.

In 2010, the project was renamed to Suhuagai. The project was intended to improve dangerous sections between Suao and Chongde; the MOTC said it will start construction in 2011.
