= Yanchao District =

District in Kaohsiung, Taiwan

Coordinates: 22.789318°N 120.369102°E

Yanchao 燕巢區
- District
- Yanchao District
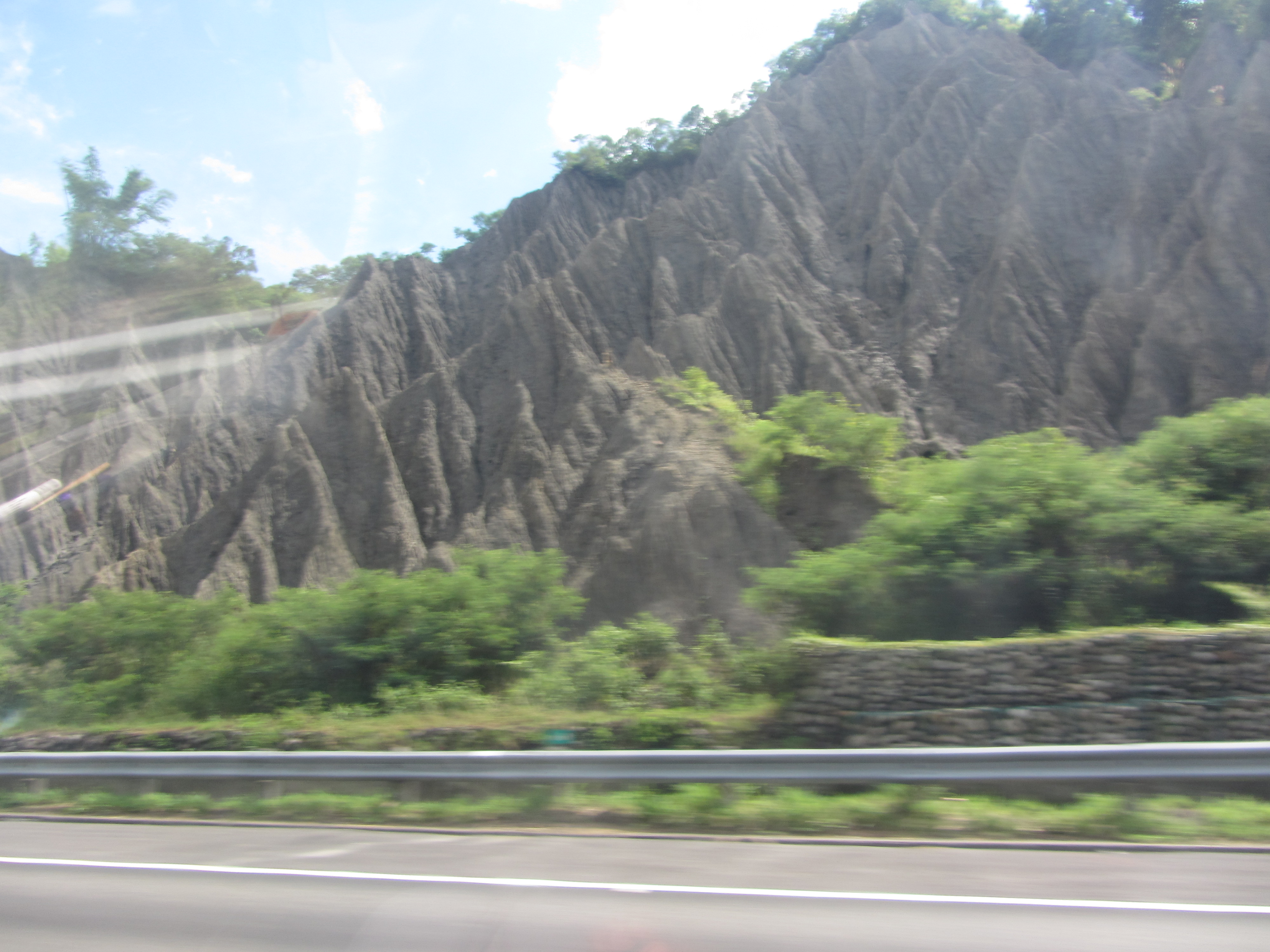

- Yanchao District in Kaohsiung City
- Country: Taiwan
- Region: Southern Taiwan

Population (October 2023)
  - Total: 28,794
- Website: yanchao.kcg.gov.tw

Yanchao District (Chinese: 燕巢區; pinyin: Yàncháo Qū; Wade–Giles: Yen^{4}-ch'ao^{2} Ch'ü^{1}) is a district of Kaohsiung City, Taiwan.

== History ==
After the handover of Taiwan from Japan to the Republic of China in 1945, Yanchao was organized as a rural township of Kaohsiung County. On 25 December 2010, Kaohsiung County was merged with Kaohsiung City and Yanchao was upgraded to a district of the city.

== Administrative divisions ==
The district consists of Jianshan, Qionglin, Anzhao, Jiaoxiu, Fengxiong, Jinshan, Tungyan, Nanyan, Xiyan, Hengshan and Shenshui Village.

== Education ==
- National Kaohsiung Normal University
- National Kaohsiung University of Science and Technology
- Shu-Te University
- I-Shou University College of Medicine

== Tourist attractions ==
- Agongdian Reservoir
- Chang-E Valley
- Chiliu Waterfall
- Guanshui Temple
- Jiaosu Mazu Temple
- Mount Jiguan
- Mount Nihou
- Sun Valley
- Yangnyu Lake

== Transportation ==
Yanchao is served by Freeways 1, 3, and 10, Provincial Highway 22, and City Route 186.

== Notable natives ==
- Wu Rong-i, Vice Premier of the Republic of China (2005–2006)
- Yang Chiu-hsing, Magistrate of Kaohsiung County (2001–2010)

== See also ==
- Kaohsiung
