= Provincial Highway 23 (Taiwan) =

Provincial highway in Taiwan

Provincial Highway 23
- 台23線

Route information
- Maintained by Directorate General of Highways
- Length: 45.4 km (28.2 mi)

Major junctions
- North end: Prov 9 in Fuli, Hualien
- South end: Prov 11 in Donghe, Taitung

Location
- Country: Taiwan

Highway system
- Highway system in Taiwan
← Prov 22	→ Prov 24

Provincial Highway 23 or Futung Highway (Chinese: 台23線) is a highway starting at Fuli, Hualien and ending in Donghe, Taitung in Taiwan. The route length is 45.4km and connects Provincial Highway No. 9 and Provincial Highway No.11 by through Hai'an Range.

== See also ==
- Highway system in Taiwan
