= Daliao District =

District in Kaohsiung, Taiwan

Coordinates: 22.596262°N 120.413536°E

Daliao 大寮區
- District
- Daliao District
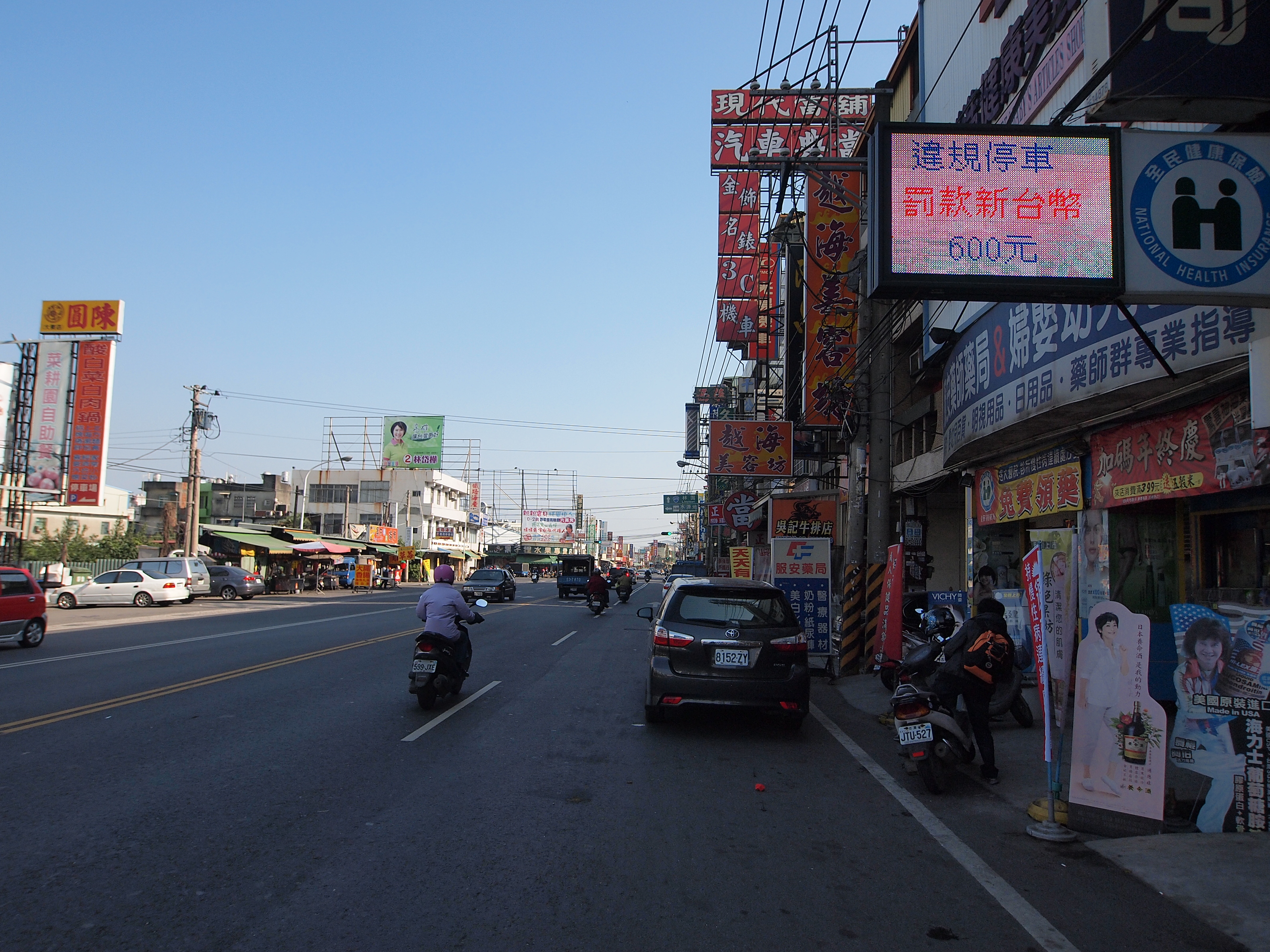

- Emblem of Daliao District

- Daliao District in Kaohsiung City
- Country: Taiwan
- City: Kaohsiung

Area
  - Total: 71.04 km^{2} (27.43 sq mi)
- Elevation: 17 m (56 ft)

Population (October 2023)
  - Total: 111,923
  - Rank: 9
  - Density: 1,569/km^{2} (4,060/sq mi)
- Postal code: 831
- Website: daliao-en.kcg.gov.tw

Daliao District (Chinese: 大寮區; pinyin: Dàliáo Qū; Wade–Giles: Ta^{4}-liao^{2} Ch'ü^{1}) is a suburban district in Kaohsiung, Taiwan. Part of the Kaohsiung metropolitan area, it has 111,923 inhabitants as of October 2023, making it the 9th most populous district of Kaohsiung. It has an area of 71.04 square kilometers, or 27.4287 square miles, giving it a population density of 1,569 people per square kilometer, or 4,064 people per square mile. It is linked with Downtown Kaohsiung by the Orange Line of the Kaohsiung Metro.

== History ==
Daliao is reported to be the origin of the surname Changchien (張簡), the most common two syllable surname in Taiwan.

After the handover of Taiwan from Japan to the Republic of China in 1945, Daliao was organized as a rural township of Kaohsiung County. On 25 December 2010, Kaohsiung County was merged with Kaohsiung City and Daliao was upgraded to a district of the city.

== Administrative divisions ==
The district consists of Kaotan, Neikeng, Daliao, Shangliao (上寮里), Sanlong, Liuqiu, Wengyuan, Qianzhuang, Zhongzhuang, Houzhuang, Yiren, Xincuo, Guoxi, Chaoliao, Guijie, Guishe, Shanding, Zhongyi, Yongfang, Yihe, Xiliao, Jiangshan, Zhaoming, Guangwu and Zhongxing Village.

== Education ==
=== Higher education ===
- Fooyin University
- Fortune Institute of Technology

=== Vocational schools ===
- Chung Shan Industrial and Commercial School
- Kaohsiung Gaoying Private Vocational School (高雄市私立高英高級工商職業學校)

=== Senior high schools ===
- Kaohsiung Xinguang Private Senior High School (高雄市私立新光高級中學)

=== Junior high schools ===
- Kaohsiung Municipal Da Laotian Junior High School (高雄市立大寮國民中學)
- Kaohsiung Municipal Chao Laotian Junior High School (高雄市立潮寮國民中學)
- Kaohsiung Municipal Zhongzhuang Junior High School (高雄市立中庄國民中學)

=== Primary schools ===
- Kaohsiung Municipal Daliao District Yongfang Primary School (高雄市大寮區永芳國民小學)
- Kaohsiung Municipal Daliao District Da Laotian Primary School (高雄市大寮區大寮國民小學)
- Kaohsiung Municipal Daliao District Zhongyi Primary School (高雄市大寮區忠義國民小學)
- Kaohsiung Municipal Daliao District Wengyuan Primary School (高雄市大寮區翁園國民小學)
- Kaohsiung Municipal Daliao District Zhongzhuang Primary School (高雄市大寮區中庄國民小學)
- Kaohsiung Municipal Daliao District Xi Laotian Primary School (高雄市大寮區溪寮國民小學)
- Kaohsiung Municipal Daliao District Zhaoming Primary School (高雄市大寮區昭明國民小學)
- Kaohsiung Municipal Daliao District Chao Laotian Primary School (高雄市大寮區潮寮國民小學)
- Kaohsiung Municipal Daliao District Shanding Primary School (高雄市大寮區山頂國民小學)
- Kaohsiung Municipal Daliao District Houzhuang Primary School (高雄市大寮區後庄國民小學)

== Tourist attractions ==
- Adzuki Bean and Fruit Journey
- Baofu Temple (保福宮), founded in 1841
- Caogong Canal Tide Gate
- Chaozhong Temple (朝中宮), founded in 1768
- Gaoping River Embankment
- Jhang Jian and Jian's Family Ancestral Shrine
- Jhuanzaiyao
- Jhuzaijiao House
- Kaifeng Temple (大發開封宮)
- Kaotan Old Banyan Tree
- Laogu Stone house
- Liouciou Old Banyan Tree
- Nansyong Daitian Temple (南雄代天府)
- Ruins of the Sugar Industry
- Shanzaiding Chen's Residence
- Sigong House
- Stone God
- Wongyuan Pimping Station

== Transportation ==
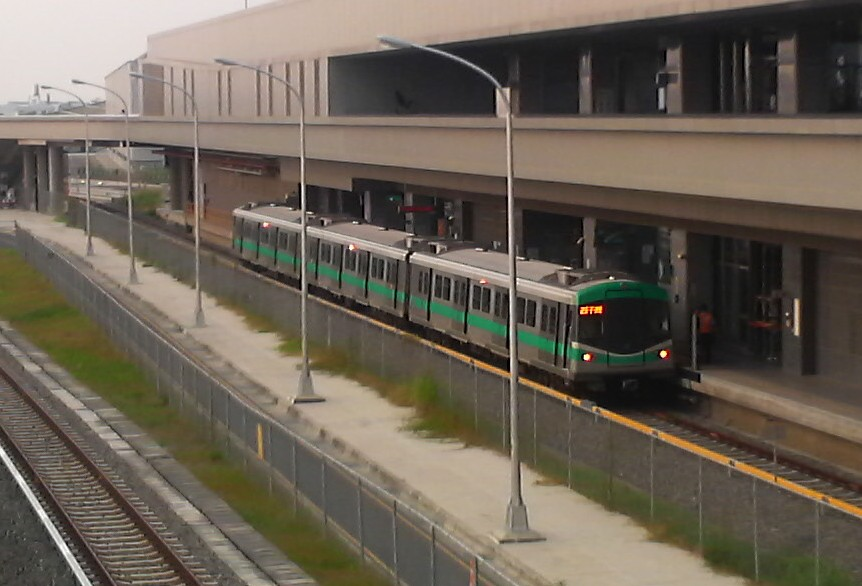
Daliao Station

- KMRT Daliao Station
- TR Houzhuang Station
- Provincial Highways 1, 1F, 25, 29, and 88

== Notable natives ==
- Lung Ying-tai, Minister of Culture (2012–2014)
