= Provincial Highway 3 (Taiwan) =

Road in Taiwan

Provincial Highway 3
- 台3線
- Inner-Mountain Highway (內山公路)
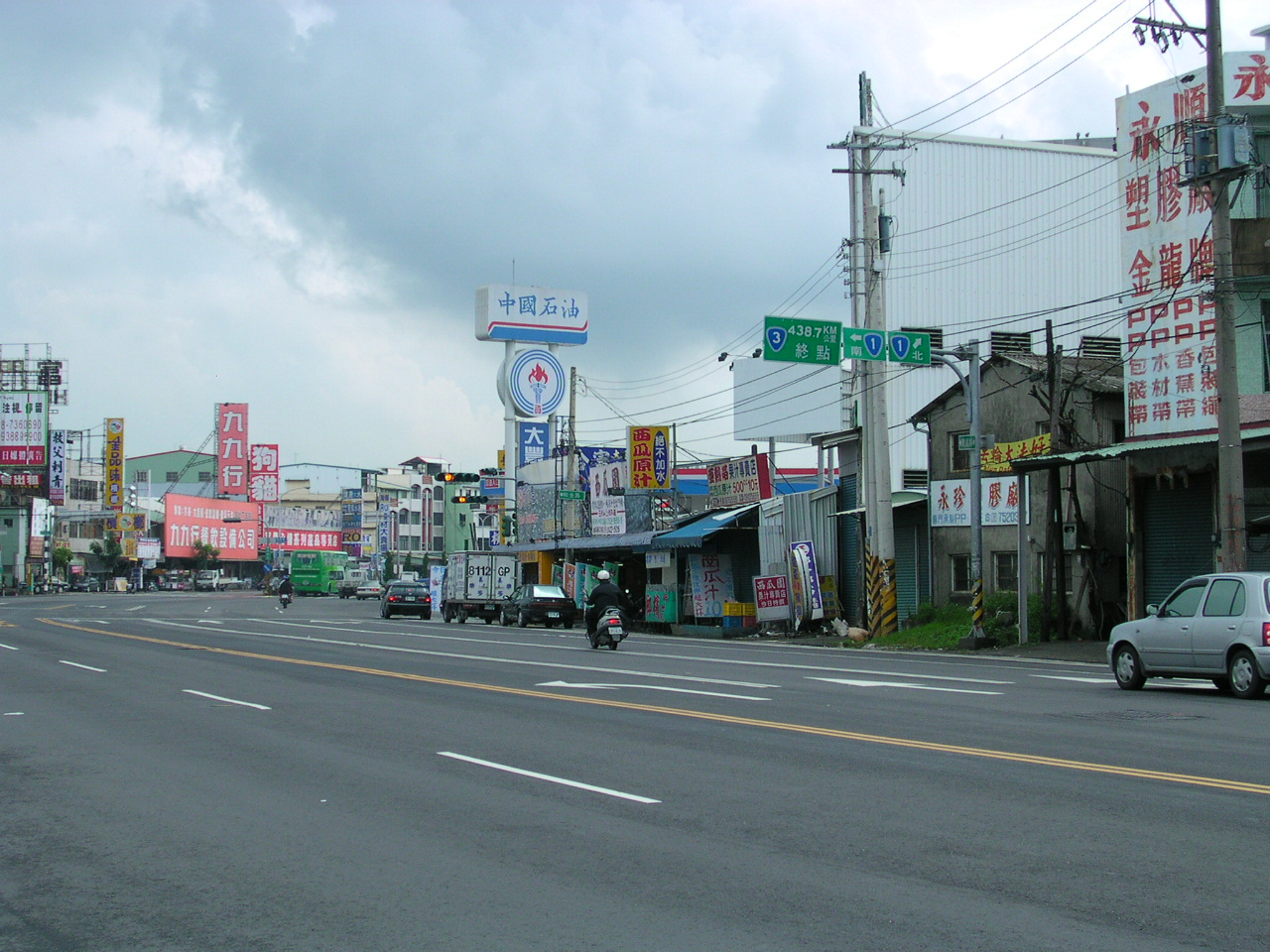
- South End of Provincial Highway 3 in Pingtung City

Route information
- Maintained by Directorate General of Highways
- Length: 436.286 km (271.096 mi)

Major junctions
- North end: Prov 1 Prov 1a Prov 5 Prov 9 in Zhongzheng District, Taipei
- Nat 3 in Tucheng; Nat 3 in Daxi District Nat 4 in Fengyuan; Nat 3 in Wufeng; Nat 6 in Wufeng; Nat 3 in Nantou; Nat 3 in Mingjian; Nat 3 in Zhushan; Nat 3 in Douliu; Nat 10 in Cishan; Nat 10 in Ligang Nat 3 in Jiuru, Pingtung
- South end: Prov 1 in Pingtung City

Location
- Country: Taiwan

Highway system
- Highway system in Taiwan
← Prov 2	→ Prov 4

Provincial Highway 3 (Chinese: 台3線) is a 435.608km long Taiwanese highway that starts in Taipei and ends in Pingtung. Also known as Inner-Mountain Highway (內山公路), the road travels through mountainous towns in Western Taiwan and was the major route for the area until Freeway 3 was built.

== Route Description ==
The route is also known as Zhongfeng Highway (中豐公路) between Longtan and Fengyuan, Zhongtan Highway (中潭公路) between central Taichung City and Caotun, and Yunmi Armaments Road (澐密戰備道路) between Zhongpu, Chiayi and Nansi in Tainan City. Since the highway runs roughly parallel to Freeway 3 for the majority of its length, it is now primarily a highway providing local access as well as a scenic alternative route to the freeway.

The highway begins in Taipei City near the Executive Yuan. After a brief concurrency with PH 1 along Zhongxiao West Road (忠孝西路), highway 3 continues along Zhonghua Road (中華路) and Heping West Road (和平西路) before leaving for Banqiao in New Taipei City via the Huajiang bridge (華江橋). In Banqiao the highway is known as Wenhua Road (文化路), one of the busiest roads in the district. At Banqiao Station, the road had a brief concurrency with County Route 106 before turning south as Zhongshan Road (中山路) and Sichuan Road (四川路) towards Tucheng. The road goes through downtown Tucheng and bypassing downtown Sanxia before entering Taoyuan City.

In Taoyuan the highway passes through old town Daxi, which is also the terminus of North Cross-Island Highway (北部橫貫公路), or PH 7. After a brief concurrency with PH 4, the highways split in Daxi. Highway 3 continues southwest to Longtan before entering Hsinchu County.

In Hsinchu the highway serves as a scenic alternative to Freeway 3, passing through the rural parts of Guanxi, Hengshan, Zhudong, Beipu, Emei, and continues to Miaoli County. In Miaoli the highway has a brief concurrency with County Route 124 in Sanwan before highway 3 splits and continues south. The highway passes through mountainous townships of Shitan, Dahu, and Zhuolan before entering Taichung City.

In Taichung highway 3 passes through more mountainous districts in Dongshi, which is also the terminus of Central Cross-Island Highway (中部橫貫公路), also known as PH 8, and Shigang before entering Fengyuan, a suburb in northern Taichung. The highway then becomes an urban road, going through the suburb of Tanzi and central Taichung as Zhongshan Road (中山路), Beitun Road (北屯路), Jinhua Road (進化路), and Jiancheng Road (建成路). The highway then exits central Taichung and enters the southern suburbs of Dali and Wufeng before leaving for Nantou County.

Highway 3 is an important highway in Nantou, connecting Caotun and Nantou City, the two main population centers in the county. The highway then passes through Mingjian and Zhushan before entering Yunlin County. In Yunlin the highway goes through Linnei and bypasses downtown Douliu. After passing through Gukeng the highway enters Chiayi County. In Chiayi the highway connects the mountainous towns of Meishan, Zhuqi, Fanlu, Zhongpu, and Dapu. Beginning from Zhongpu to Nansi, the highway becomes a winding mountainous road known as the Yunmi Armaments Road (澐密戰備道路), as the road was initially built for wartime preparations. The highway passes through the Zengwen Dam in Dapu, the largest reservoir in Taiwan by volume, and enters Nansi in Tainan City.

In Tainan City, the highway goes through Nansi, Yujing, and Nanhua. The highway has a concurrency with PH 20 from Yujing to Nanhua before the latter turns east and becomes the Southern Cross-Island Highway (南部橫貫公路). Highway 3 then enters Kaohsiung City, passing through the downtowns of mountainous districts of Neimen and Cishan. Highway 3 then goes through Jiuru and Ligang in Pingtung County before ending at the intersection with PH 1 in Pingtung City.

== Spur Routes ==
- Prov 3A: The route connects Caotun, Nantou and Nantou City. This is the stretch of old highway 3 between these cities. The total length is 11.713 km.
- Prov 3B: The highway is a spur route that goes from Shimen Dam to Highway 3 in Daxi District, Taoyuan City. The total length is 12.095 km.
- Prov 3C: The route goes from Highway 3 in Zhushan, Nantou to County Route 152 in Jiji, Nantou. The highway provides access from the parent route to the township of Jiji. The total length is 7.124 km.
