= Provincial Highway 88 (Taiwan) =

Road in Taiwan

Provincial Highway 88
- 台88線
- 高雄潮州線 (Kaohsiung-Chaozhou Expressway)

Route information
- Maintained by Directorate General of Highways
- Length: 22.391 km (13.913 mi)
- Existed: 18 November 2000–present

Major junctions
- West end: Nat 1 in Fongshan, Kaohsiung City
- Nat 3 in Zhutian, Pingtung
- East end: TR pt85 in Zhutian, Pingtung

Location
- Country: Taiwan

Highway system
- Highway system in Taiwan
← Prov 86	→ Prov 1

Provincial Highway 88

Provincial Highway 88 (Chinese: 台88線) is an expressway, which begins in Fongshan District, Kaohsiung on National Highway No. 1 and ends in Zhutian Township, Pingtung County on Yong-an Road.

== Length ==
The total length is 22.391 km (14 mi).

== Exit List ==
City	Location	km	Mile	Exit	Name	Destinations	Notes
Kaohsiung City	Fongshan	0	0.0	0	Wujia System	Nat 1	
Kaohsiung City	Fongshan	2.2	1.4	2	Fengshan	Cty 183a / Cty 188 – Fongshan, Siaogang, Kaohsiung International Airport	
Kaohsiung City	Daliao	7.0	4.3	7	Daliao	Prov 25 / Cty 188 – Daliao, Linyuan	
Kaohsiung City	Daliao	9.7	6.0	9	Dafa	Prov 29 / Cty 188 – Dashu, Dafa Industrial Park	
Pingtung County	Wandan	15.8	9.8	15	Wandan	Prov 27 / Cty 188 – Wandan, Pingtung City, Xinyuan, Donggang	
Pingtung County	Zhutian	21.2	13.2	21	Zhutian System	Nat 3 – Pingtung City, Linbian	
Pingtung County	Zhutian	22.391	13.913	22	Zhutian End	TR pt85 – Wanluan, Zhutian, Neipu, Chaozhou	
1.000 mi = 1.609 km; 1.000 km = 0.621 mi: Incomplete access

== Major Cities Along the Route ==
- Kaohsiung City

== Intersections with other Freeways and Expressways ==
- National Highway No. 1 at Wujia JCT. in Fongshan District
- National Highway No. 3 at Zhutian JCT. in Zhutian, Pingtung

== See also ==
- Highway system in Taiwan
