= National Freeway 4 =

National freeway in Taiwan

National freeway 4
- Taichung Beltway / Taichung Circular Line

Route information
- Maintained by Taiwan Area National Freeway Bureau
- Length: 28.0 km (17.4 mi)
- Existed: 16 November 2001–present

Major junctions
- West end: Prov 17 in Qingshui
- Nat 3 in Qingshui; Nat 1 in Shengang
- East end: Prov 74 in Tanzi

Location
- Country: Taiwan

Highway system
- Highway system in Taiwan
← Nat 3	→ Nat 5

National freeway 4

National freeway 4 is a freeway that begins in Qingshui District, Taichung at Provincial Highway 17 and ends in Tanzi District at Provincial Highway 74. It acts as the second ring road for the Taichung area.

== Length ==
The total length is 28.0 km (17.4 miles).

== Major cities along the route ==
- Taichung City

== Exit List ==
County	Location	km	mi	Exit	Name	Destinations	Notes
Taichung City	Qingshui	0.0	0.0	0	Qingshui	Prov 17 / Prov 1 – Qingshui, Port of Taichung	
Taichung City	Qingshui	2.3	1.4	2	Zhonggang System	Nat 3 – Shalu, Dajia	
Taichung City	Shengang	9.0	5.6	9	Shengang	Sanmin Rd. – Shengang, Cty 132 – Houli	
Taichung City	Shengang	11.7	7.3	11	Taichung System	Nat 1 – Houli, Taichung	
Taichung City	Houli	14	8.7	14	Houfeng	Prov 13 – Houli, Fengyuan	
Taichung City	Fengyuan	17.8	11.1	18	Fengshi	Prov 3 – Fengyuan, Shigang, Dongshi, Dongfeng Expressway (In Progress)	
Taichung City	Tanzi	26.0	16.2	26	Tanzi	Fugui Road/Fengxing Road/Fengyuan Blvd.	
Taichung City	Tanzi	28.0	17.4	28	Tanzi System	Prov 74 – Tanzi, Taiping, Dali	Terminus of freeway
1.000 mi = 1.609 km; 1.000 km = 0.621 mi

== Lanes ==
The lanes in each direction are listed below.

- 3 lanes:
  - Qingshui Top - Fengshi IC
- 2 lanes:
  - Fengshi IC-Tanzi System

== See also ==
- Highway system in Taiwan

== Notes ==
Completed in November 2001.

The Fengshi - Tanzi section was opened on 16 January 2023.
