= National Freeway 7 =

Road in Taiwan

National Freeway 7 (Chinese: 國道7號) is a planned freeway in Kaohsiung City, Taiwan. The freeway will connect the Port of Kaohsiung to Freeway 10 (Kaohsiung Branch) along the eastern suburbs of Kaohsiung. Construction is expected to begin in 2026.
