= Taiwan Area National Expressway Engineering Bureau =

Former government agency of Taiwan

Coordinates: 25.025408°N 121.546981°E

- 交通部臺灣區國道新建工程局

Agency overview
- Formed: 5 January 1990
- Dissolved: 12 February 2018
- Jurisdiction: Republic of China
- Headquarters: Da'an, Taipei
- Parent agency: Ministry of Transportation and Communications

The Taiwan Area National Expressway Engineering Bureau (TANEEB; traditional Chinese: 交通部臺灣區國道新建工程局; simplified Chinese: 交通部台湾区国道新建工程局; pinyin: Jiāotōng Bù Táiwān Qū Guódào Xīnjiàn Gōngchéng Jú) was the organization under the Ministry of Transportation and Communications of the Republic of China in charge for the planning, land acquisition, bidding and construction of national expressway network in Taiwan.

== History ==
TANEEB was established on 5 January 1990 due to the increasing flow of vehicles after the opening of the first freeway in 1978.

On 12 February 2018, it was merged into the Freeway Bureau.

== See also ==
- Ministry of Transportation and Communications (Republic of China)
- Highway system in Taiwan
