= Guanmiao District =

District in Tainan, Taiwan

Coordinates: 22°57′9.1″N 120°20′3.3″E

Guanmiao 關廟區
- District
- Guanmiao District
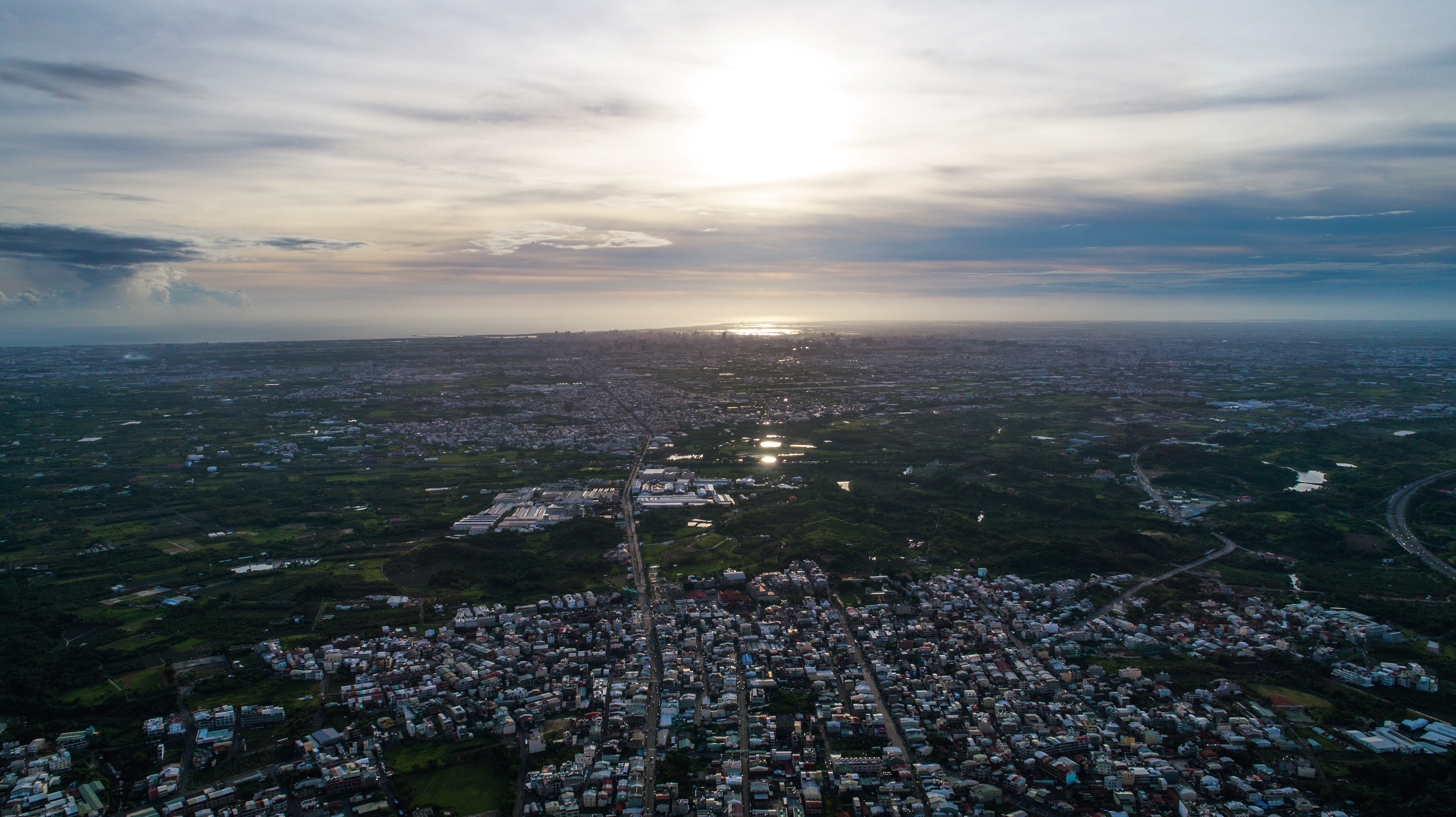

- Guanmiao District in Tainan City
- Location: Tainan, Taiwan

Area
  - Total: 54 km^{2} (21 sq mi)

Population (January 2023)
  - Total: 33,436
  - Density: 620/km^{2} (1,600/sq mi)
- Website: guanmiao.tainan.gov.tw/en/

Guanmiao District (Chinese: 關廟區; pinyin: Guānmiào Qū; Wade–Giles: Kuan^{1}-miao^{4} Ch'ü^{1}; Pe̍h-ōe-jī: Koan-biō-khu) is a rural district in southeastern Tainan, Taiwan.

== History ==
After the handover of Taiwan from Japan to the Republic of China in 1945, Guanmiao was organized as a rural township of Tainan County. On 25 December 2010, Tainan County was merged with Tainan City and Guanmiao was upgraded to a district of the city.

== Geography ==
- Area: 53.64 km^{2}
- Population: 33,436 people (January 2023)

== Administrative divisions ==
The district consists of Guanmiao, Shanxi, Xiangyang, Beishi, Xinpu, Xinguang, Wujia, Tungshi, Songjiao, Shenkeng, Budai, Beitou, Xiahu, Huayuan and Nanxiong Village.

== Tourist attractions ==
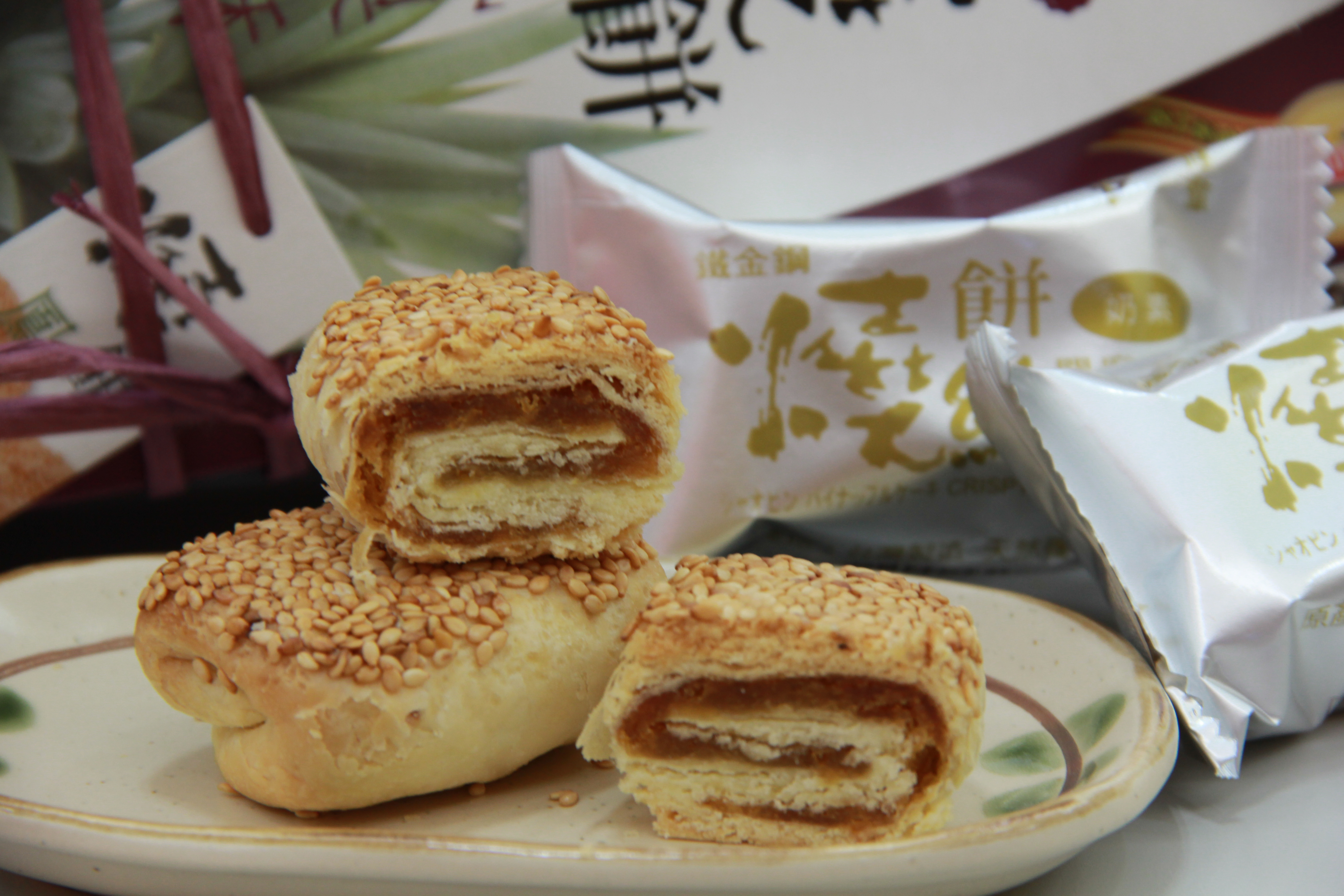
Pastries made with pineapples from Guanmiao.

- Datan Lake Wanglai Park
- Fang Family Shrine
- Guanmiao Forest Park
- Guanmiao Shansi Temple
- Hills of Seven Constellations
- Sinfeng Church
- Thousand-Buddha Bodhi Temple
- Tiesian Bridge
- Yu Zen Retirement Center

== Transportation ==
Guanmiao Service Area and an interchange of the Formosa Freeway is located in here.

== Notable natives ==
- Kuo Kuo-wen, Deputy Minister of Labor (2016–2017)
- Chien-Ming Wang, MLB Pitcher (2000–2016)
