= Waipu District =

District in Taichung, Taiwan

Coordinates: 24°19′47.5″N 120°39′14.8″E

Waipu 外埔區
- District
- Waipu District
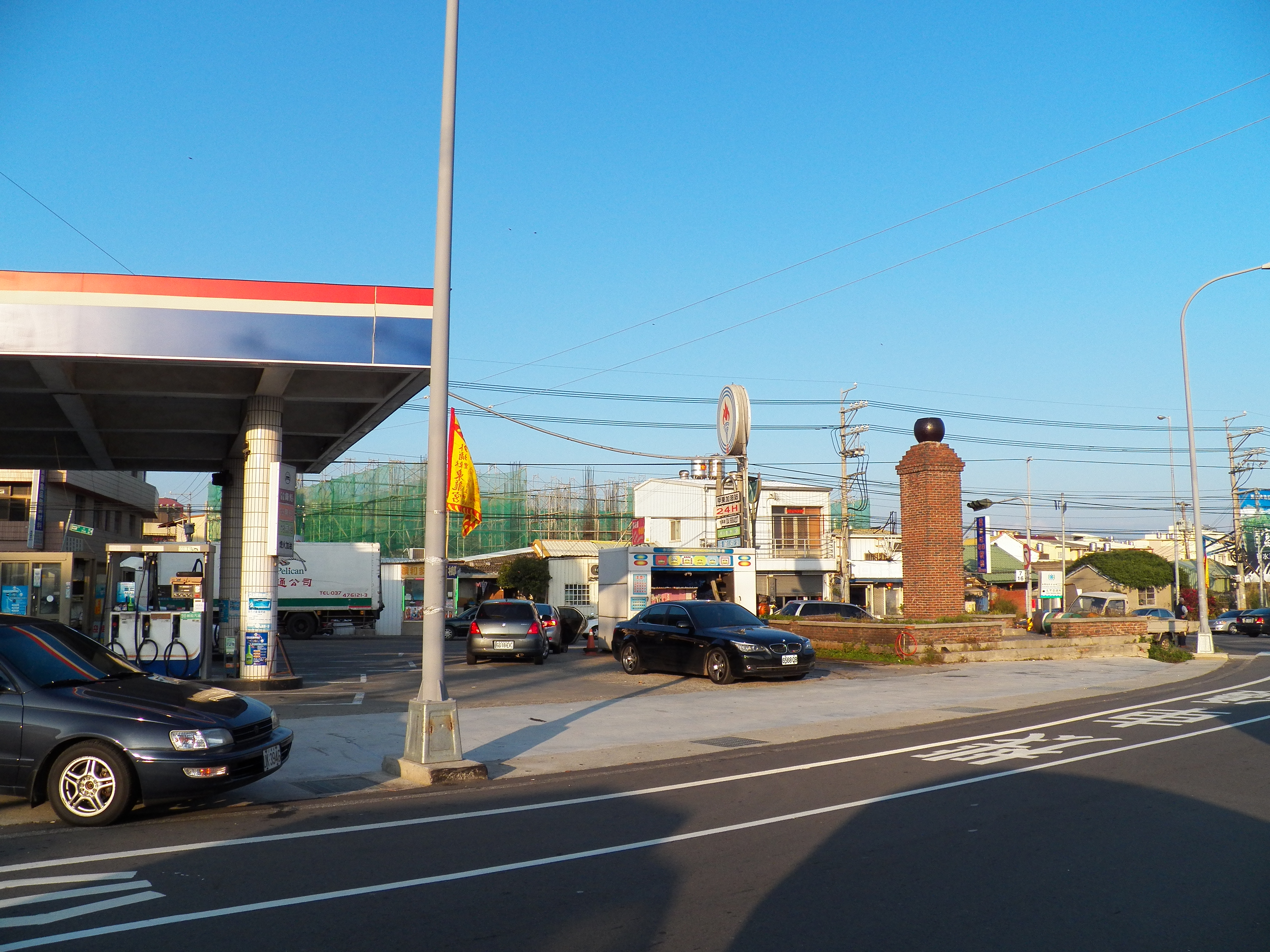

- Waipu District in Taichung City
- Location: Taichung, Taiwan

Area
  - Total: 42 km^{2} (16 sq mi)

Population (February 2023)
  - Total: 31,186
  - Density: 740/km^{2} (1,900/sq mi)
- Website: www.waipu.taichung.gov.tw (in Chinese)

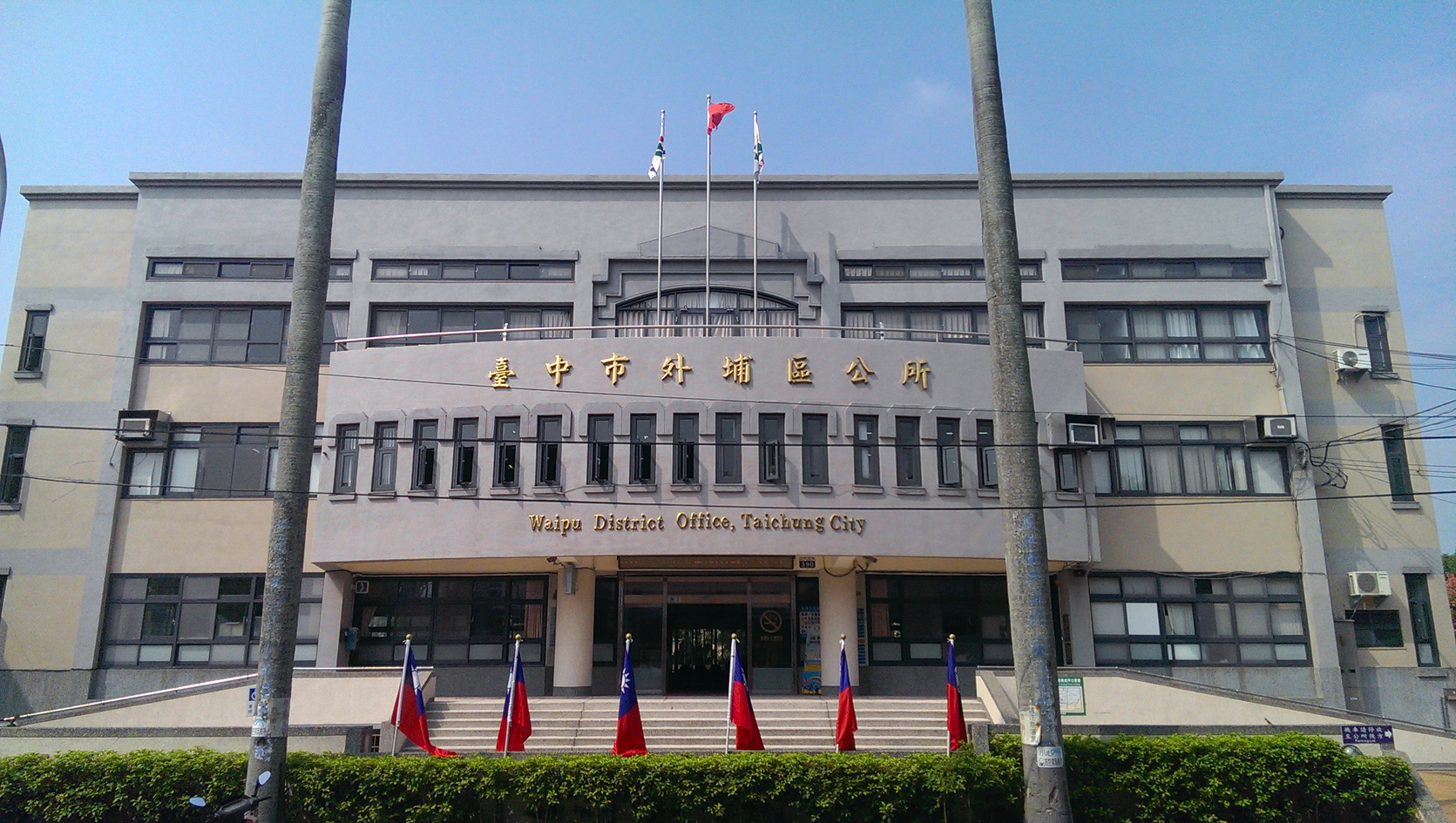
Waipu District Office

Waipu District (Chinese: 外埔區; pinyin: Wàipǔ Qū) is a rural district in Taichung City, Taiwan. It has a population total of 31,186 and an area of 42.4099 square kilometres.

== Administrative divisions ==
Yongfeng, Liufen, Datong, Datung, Sankan, Shuimei, Tieshan, Zhongshan, Maming, Tucheng and Buzi Village.

== Transportation ==
Taiwan High Speed Rail passes through the central part of the district, but no station is currently planned.

== See also ==
- Taichung
