= Yujing District =

District in Tainan, Taiwan

Coordinates: 23°07′N 120°28′E

Yujing 玉井區 Tamai; Tapani
- District
- Yujing District in Tainan City
- Location: Tainan, Taiwan

Area
  - Total: 76 km^{2} (29 sq mi)

Population (January 2023)
  - Total: 13,121
  - Density: 170/km^{2} (450/sq mi)
- Website: www.yujing.gov.tw/en/

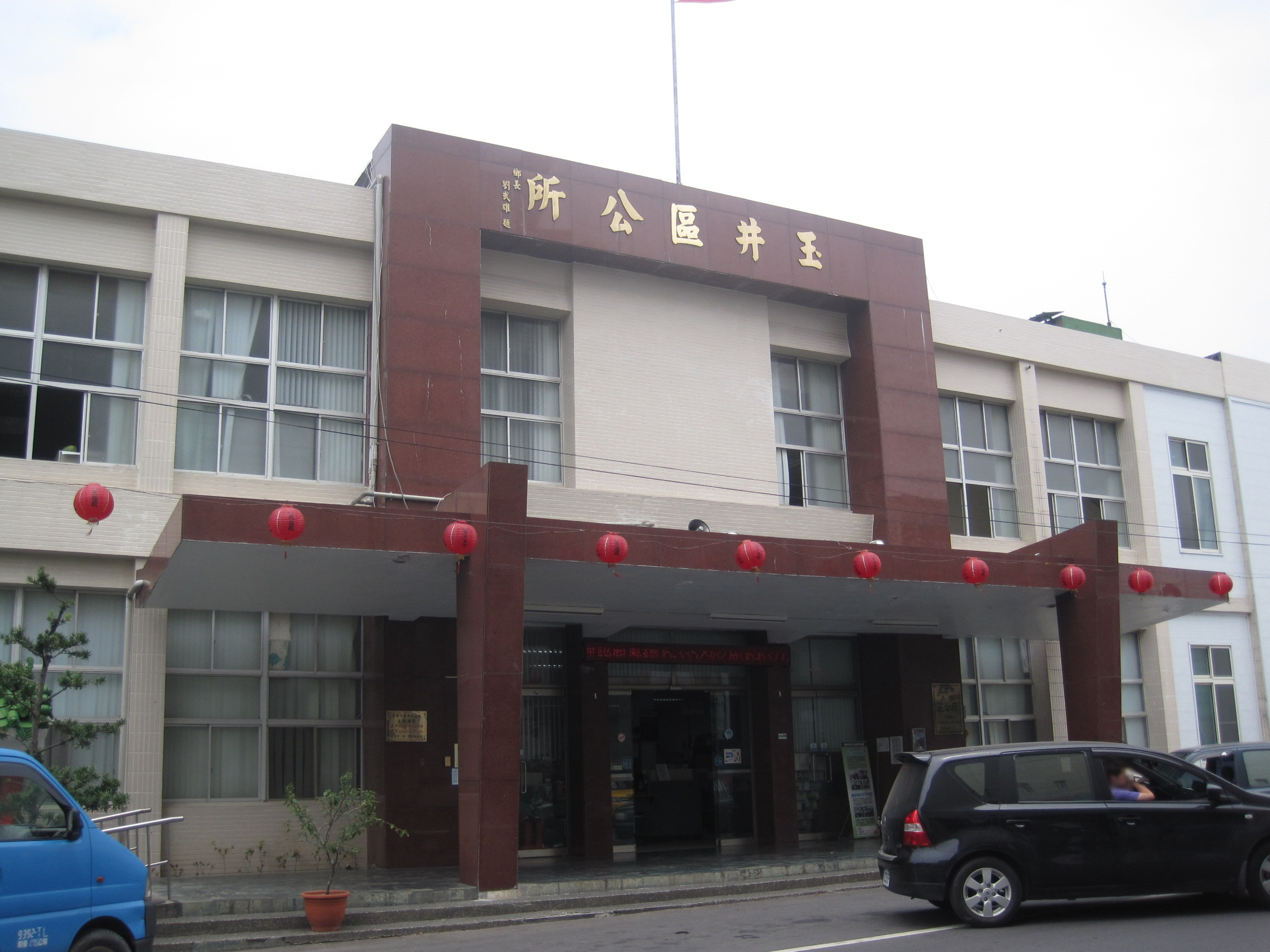
Yujing District Office

Yujing District (Chinese: 玉井區; pinyin: Yùjǐng Qū) is a rural district in eastern Tainan, Taiwan. It is famous for its cultivation of mangoes.

After a 6.4-magnitude earthquake hit southern Taiwan in March 2010, pillars were severely damaged at Yujing Junior High School forcing school officials to cancel some classes.

== History ==
Yujing, was formerly known as Tapani (or Tamani in Dutch records after 1650's; transliterated as Chinese: 噍吧哖; Pe̍h-ōe-jī: Ta-pa-nî) in Taivoan, is likely the site of Tapani tribe of Tevorang people, a former political unit of the Taiwanese aborigines. The name has also been spelled Tefurang, Tefurangh, Tevoran, Tevourang, and Devoran. Tevorang was one of nine villages that joined in warfare against the people of Favorlang (modern-day Huwei, Yunlin).

During the Kingdom of Tungning, members of the Siraya people from the Tavocan area (modern-day Xinhua) moved to this area due to conflicts with Han Chinese.

The Tapani Incident of 1915 was one of the largest armed uprisings by Taiwanese Han and aboriginals against Japanese rule in Taiwan.

In 1920, political divisions of Taiwan had structural changes and many geographical names were changed into Japanese style. The name Tapani was transliterated as in Japanese Tamai (Kanji: 玉井) and administratively was called Tamai Village, Shinka District (新化郡), Tainan Prefecture. During Japanese rule, Tamai produced abundant sugar.

=== Republic of China ===
The name Tamai (Kanji: 玉井) of the very same Japanese Kanji is pronounced Yujing in Mandarin Chinese. After the handover of Taiwan from Japan to the Republic of China in 1945, Yujing was organized as a rural township of Tainan County. On 25 December 2010, Tainan County was merged with Tainan City and Yujing was upgraded to a district of the city. In the 1960s, with government promotion, the name "Yujing" became almost synonymous with "mangos".

== Geography ==
- Area: 76.3662 km^{2}
- Population: 13,121 people (January 2023)

== Administrative divisions ==
The district consists of Yujing, Yutian, Zhongzheng, Zhuwei, Shatian, Sanpu, Sanhe, Wangming, Cenglin and Fengli Village.

== Tourist attractions ==
- Ancient Battlefield with Memorial Tablet to Yu Qingfang
- Mango Industry Culture Information Hall
- Siiangjhih Park
- Yujing Beiji Temple
- Yusha Oncidium Orchid Garden

== Transportation ==
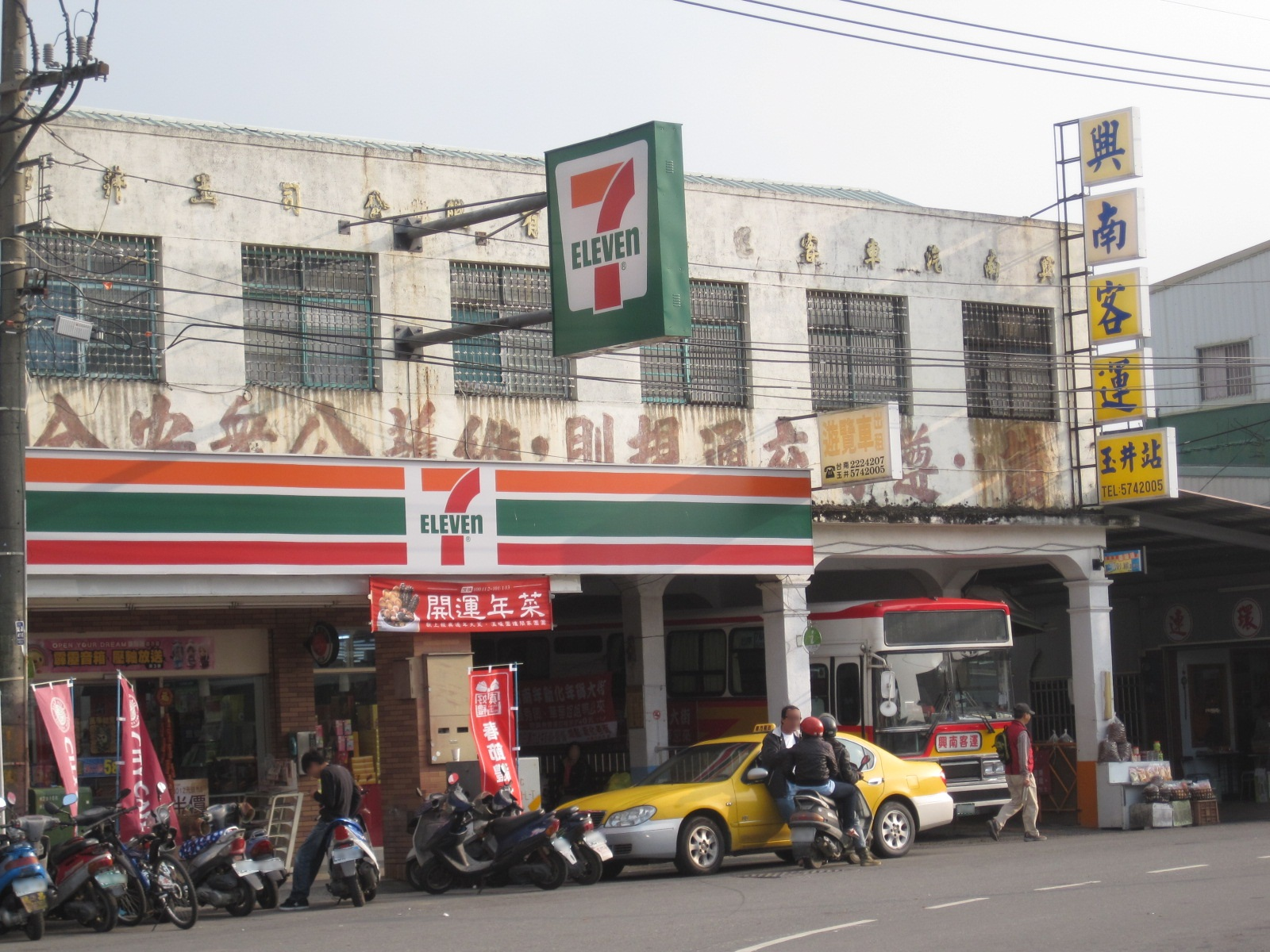
Yujing Bus Station

Bus station in the district is Yujing Bus Station of Shing Nan Bus. The district is connected to Beimen District through Provincial Highway 84.

== Notable natives ==
- Wang Sing-nan, legislator

== See also ==
- Tainan
