= Freeway Bureau =

Republic of China government agency

- 交通部高速公路局; Jiāotōng Bù Gāosù Gōnglù Jú

Agency overview
- Formed: 8 June 1970
- Headquarters: Taishan, New Taipei, Taiwan
- Parent agency: Ministry of Transportation and Communications
- Website: Official website

The Freeway Bureau (Chinese: 高速公路局; pinyin: Gāosù Gōnglù Jú) is the government agency under the Ministry of Transportation and Communications of Taiwan in charge managing the national highway system. It is responsible for planning the freeway network, managing construction, toll collection, traveller services, traffic management, and maintenance.

== History ==
The bureau was originally established on 8 June 1970 as Freeway Engineering Bureau to oversee the construction of National Freeway 1. On 1 December 1978, it was renamed to Taiwan Area National Freeway Bureau as the responsibilities of the bureau transitioned to managing freeway operations.

On 5 March 1987, the bureau established a separate office for the construction of National Freeway 3 to alleviate congestion on National Freeway 1. In 17 April 1989, plans began being developed to construct a freeway between Nangang and Yilan which would eventually become National Freeway 5. On 5 January 1990, the offices overseeing construction were combined to form a separate Taiwan Area National Expressway Engineering Bureau.

On 12 February 2018, the Taiwan Area National Freeway Bureau was merged back with the Taiwan Area National Expressway Engineering Bureau, and was renamed the Freeway Bureau.

== Organizational structure ==
- Civil Service Ethics Office
- Personnel Office
- BAS Office
- Secretary Office
- Land Division
- Construction Division
- Technical Division
- Toll and Service Division: Manages the ETC system
- Traffic Management Division
- Widening Region Engineering Office
- Southern Region Engineering Office
- Central Region Engineering Office
- Northern Region Engineering Office

== See also ==
- Ministry of Transportation and Communications (Taiwan)
- Highway system in Taiwan
