= Ligang =

Rural township in Pingtung County, Taiwan

Coordinates: 22°48′04.1″N 120°30′25.1″E

Ligang Township 里港鄉
- Rural township
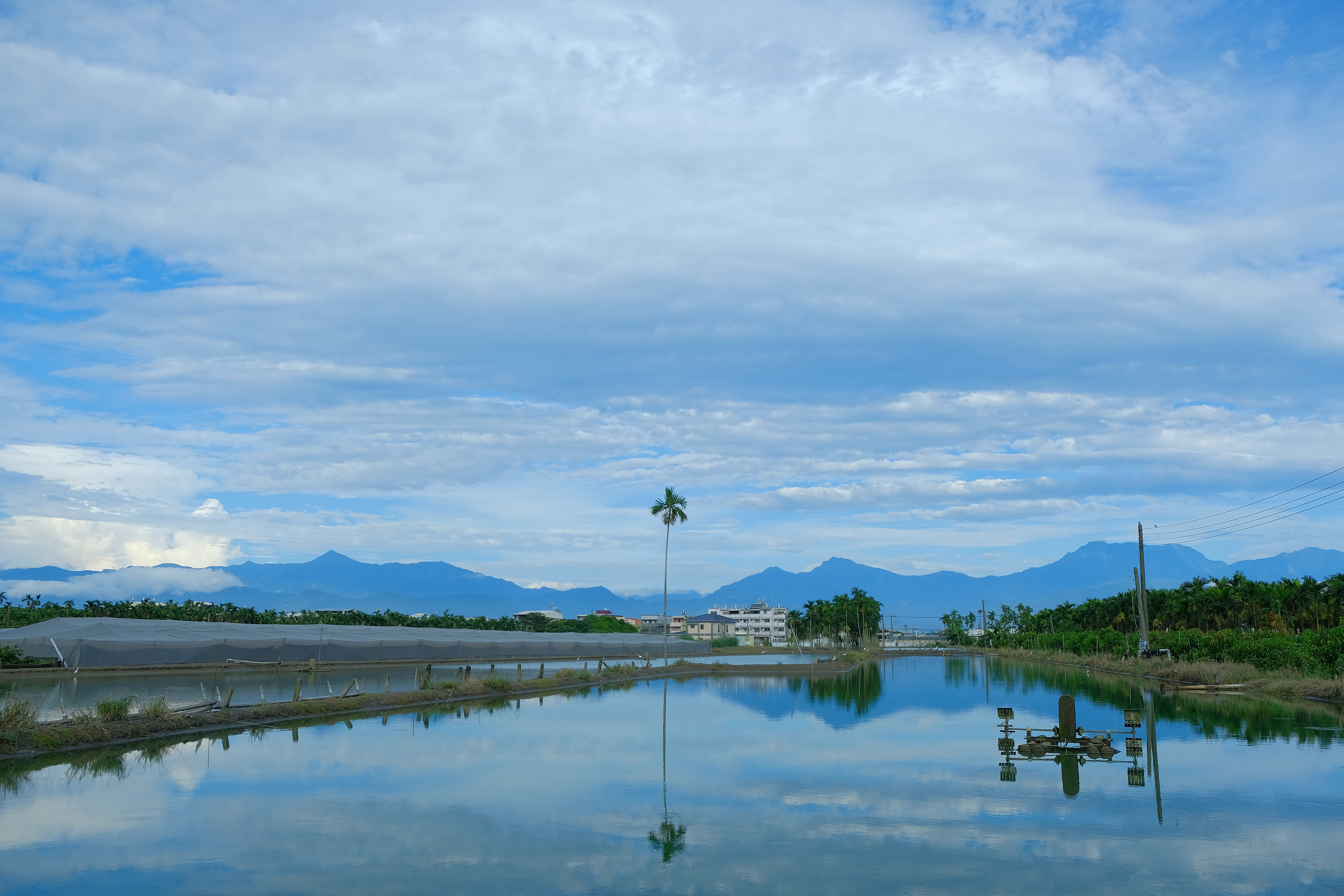

- Ligang Township in Pingtung County
- Interactive map of Ligang Township 里港鄉
- Location: Pingtung County, Taiwan

Area
  - Total: 69 km^{2} (27 sq mi)

Population (February 2024)
  - Total: 25,582
  - Density: 370/km^{2} (960/sq mi)

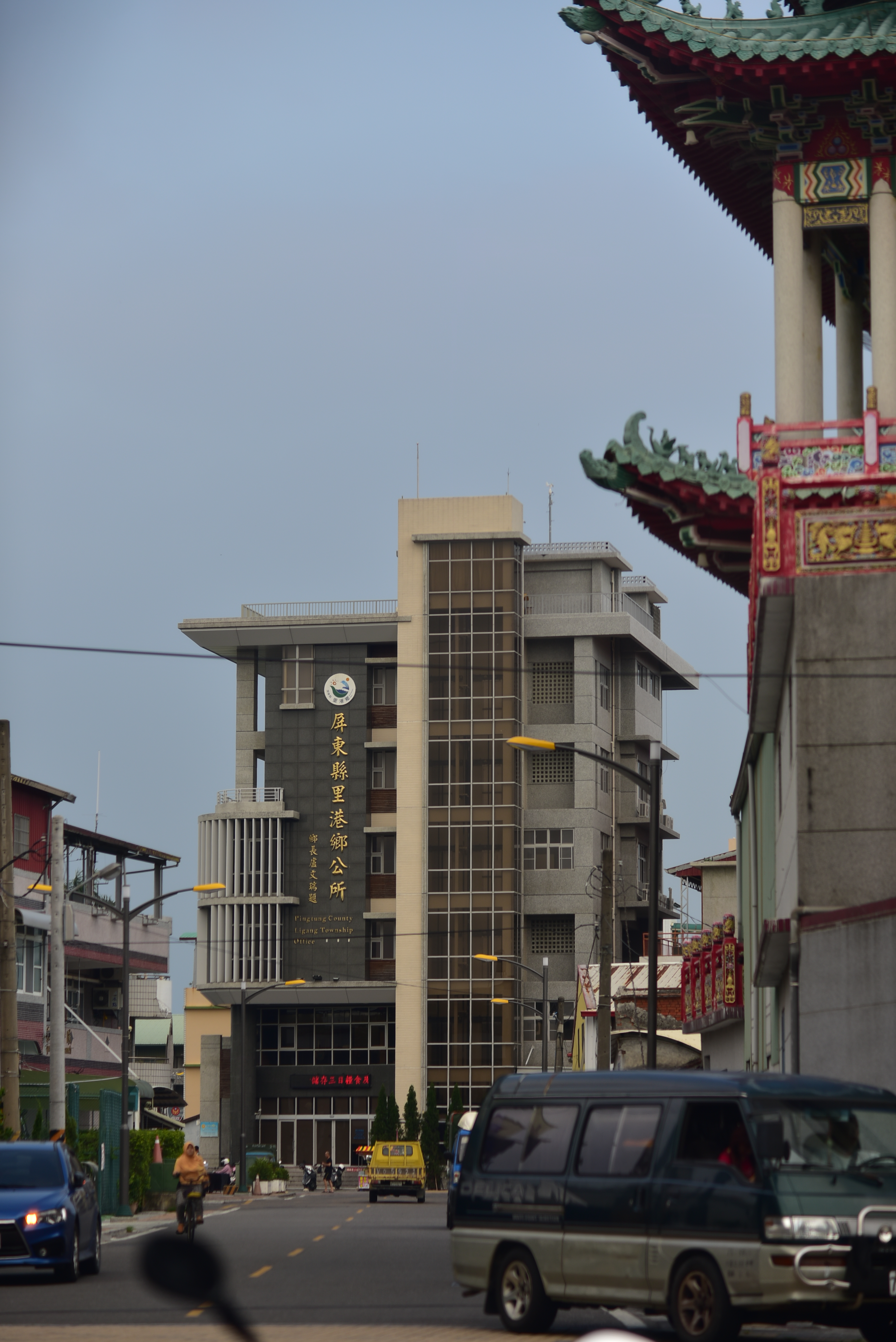
Ligang Township Office

Ligang Township (Chinese: 里港鄉; pinyin: Lǐgǎng Xiāng; Wade–Giles: Li^{3}-kang^{3} Hsiang^{1}) is a rural township in Pingtung County, Taiwan. The area is the site of the market town 阿里港 (A-li-kang).

== History ==
Scottish Presbyterian missionary William Campbell visited 阿里港 (A-li-kang) in the mid-1870s.

== Geography ==
It has a population total of 25,582 and an area of 68.92 square kilometres (26.61 sq mi)

== Administrative divisions ==
Villages in Ligang Township

The township comprises 14 villages: Chaocuo, Chunlin, Daping, Guojiang, Jiadong, Mili, Sanbu, Talou, Tiedian, Tuku, Yongchun, Yutian, Zaixing and Zhonghe.
