= Provincial Highway 1 (Taiwan) =

Road in Taiwan

Provincial Highway 1
- 台1線
- North-South Highway (縱貫公路)

Route information
- Maintained by Directorate General of Highways
- Length: 461.081 km (286.502 mi)
- Existed: 1965–present

Major junctions
- North end: Prov 1A / Prov 3 / Prov 5 / Prov 9 in Zhongzheng District, Taipei
- NH 1 in Yangmei; NH 3 in Xiangshan; NH 1 in Toufen; NH 1 in Dadu and Wuri; NH 1 in Xiluo; NH 8 in Sinshih; NH 1 in Yongkang; NH 1 in Kaohsiung; NH 3 in Linluo
- South end: Prov 9 / Prov 26 in Fangshan, Pingtung County

Location
- Country: Taiwan

Highway system
- Highway system in Taiwan
← Prov 88	→ Prov 2

Provincial Highway 1 (Chinese: 台1線; pinyin: Tái Yī Xiàn) is a 461.081 km (286.502 mi)-long Taiwanese provincial highway that starts in the north of the country near Taipei Main Station and ends in the south at Fangshan, Pingtung County. It intersects with Provincial Highway 9 and Provincial Highway 26. Before the freeway system was built in Taiwan, this was the primary north–south highway for the island. The highway connects most of the major cities in Taiwan. In most parts of Taiwan, the road is known as the North-South Highway (縱貫公路).

Kilometre posts on the highway count south from Taipei.

== Route Description ==
=== Taipei and New Taipei Cities ===
Provincial Highway 1 begins in front of Executive Yuan in Taipei. The highway follows Zhongxiao West Road (忠孝西路) in Taipei, and crosses into Sanchong, New Taipei City via Zhongxiao Bridge (忠孝橋). The highway is known as Xinbei Blvd (新北大道) as it passes through Sanchong, Xinzhuang, and Taishan. PH 1 continues through Shulin and enters Taoyuan City.

=== Taoyuan, Hsinchu, Miaoli ===
In Taoyuan, PH1 passes through the most populated areas, including Guishan, Downtown Taoyuan, Bade, Zhongli, Pingzhen, and Yangmei. In downtown Taoyuan, PH1 runs concurrent with PH4. The highway continues to Hsinchu County, passing Hukou, Xinfeng, Zhubei before entering downtown Hsinchu City. PH 1 continues through Miaoli County, connecting the coastal townships of Zhunan, Toufen, Zaoqiao, Houlong, Xihu, Tongxiao, and Yuanli before entering Taichung City. The highway briefly runs concurrent with PH61 (Xibin Expressway, 西濱快速道路) in Tongxiao, Miaoli.

=== Taichung and Changhua ===
In Taichung City, PH 1 is an important route connecting the coastal districts. The highway passes through the districts of Dajia, Qingshui, Wuqi, Longjing, and Dadu, before exiting the city in Wuri. The highway continues to Changhua County, Passing through Changhua City and the agricultural townships of Huatan and Dacun before entering downtown Yuanlin. From Yuanlin the highway continues through a number of rural townships, including Puxin, Yongjing, Tianwei, Beidou, Xizhou, and Pitou. The highway enters Xiluo in Yunlin County via Xizhou Bridge (溪州大橋), passing through Zhuoshui River.

=== Yunlin, Chiayi, and Tainan ===
PH 1 in Yunlin county passes through Xiluo, Cihtong, Huwei, Dounan and Dapi before entering Chiayi County at Dalin. The highway continues through Xikou and Minxiong before entering Chiayi City. PH 1 then continues to Shuishang in Chiayi County before entering Tainan City. In Tainan City, the highway is one of the main roads that connect the major urban districts. The urban and rural districts served by PH 1 include Houbi, Xinying, Liouying, Lioujia, Guantian, Shanhua, Xinshi, and Yongkang. The highway then goes through the downtown Tainan City and Tainan Airport as Zhonghua Rd. (中華路)

=== Kaohsiung and Pingtung ===
Entering Kaohsiung City, the highway passes through several rural and suburban districts, including Hunei, Lujhu, Gangshan, and Ciaotou, before entering central Kaohsiung City. In central Kaohsiung, PH 1 follows Minzu Rd. (民族路) before turning to an east–west direction along Jiuru Rd. (九如路) and Jianguo Rd. (建國路) in Fengshan. The highway crosses through Gaoping River in Daliao and continues toward Pingtung City in Pingtung County. After bypassing downtown Pingtung City, the highway goes back to a north–south direction, passing through Linluo, Neipu, Zhutian, Chaozhou, Nanzhou, Xinpi, Jiadong, Fangliao, and ends at the intersection of PH 9 and PH 26 in Fangshan.

== Major cities along the route ==
- Taipei (begin highway)
- New Taipei
- Taoyuan
- Zhubei
- Hsinchu
- Changhua
- Chiayi
- Tainan
- Kaohsiung
- Pingtung
- Fangshan (end highway)

== Special routes ==
Special routes of Provincial Highway 1 use the same number, followed by a heavenly stem character. In English, these characters are replaced by letters in alphabetical order.

- Highway 1A (台1甲線): This route is based on the old Highway 1 segment in Taipei and parts of Taoyuan. The road starts from the same intersection as Highway 1 in Taipei and ends in Taoyuan, with a brief concurrency with Highway 1 in Xinzhuang. The road passes through the downtown areas of Sanchong and Xinzhuang, while its parent route bypasses these areas. The sections in Sanchong and Xinzhuang follow Chongxing Road (重新路) and Zhongzheng Road (中正路). The total length is 27.432 km (17.045 mi).
- Highway 1B (台1乙線): This route serves as a connecting route to central Taichung City for Highway 1. The road starts from the junction of PH 10 in Daya District and ends at the junction of the parent route in Dadu District, both within Taichung. The total length is 21.931 km (13.627 mi).
- Highway 1C (台1丙線): This route is an alternate route for Highway 1 and bypasses Changhua City. The total length is 8.032 km (4.991 mi).
- Highway 1D (台1丁線): This route connects Highway 1 from Citong to Douliu. It was a segment of Highway 1 until the highway was rerouted to a route bypassing Douliu. The total length is 14.011 km (8.706 mi).
- Highway 1E (台1戊線): This route connects downtown Kaohsiung, Fengshan, and Daliao. The road runs parallel to Highway 1, and is also previously a segment of the parent highway. The total length is 8.727 km (5.423 mi).
- Highway 1F (台1己線): This route connects Provincial Highway 61, Freeway 3, and Highway 1 in Zhunan. The total length is 4.188 km (2.602 mi).
