= Mitsui Shopping Park LaLaport Kaohsiung =

Shopping mall in Kaohsiung, Taiwan

Coordinates: 22.62390°N 120.34658°E

Lalaport Kaohsiung under construction in 2026

Mitsui Shopping Park LaLaport Kaohsiung is an upcoming shopping mall located in Kaohsiung, Taiwan. It is the third Lalaport shopping complex in Taiwan, after Mitsui Shopping Park LaLaport Taichung in and Mitsui Shopping Park LaLaport Nangang. Developed by Japanese real estate developer Mitsui Fudosan, construction began in 2023. The mall, expected to open in 2027, is situated in the city's Fongshan District, near the National Kaohsiung Center for the Arts.

The mall is planned to have about 270 stores. It will include a branch of Korean digital arts operator ARTE MUSEUM and local restaurant group Hanlai Foods.

== See also ==
- List of shopping malls in Taiwan
- Mitsui Shopping Park LaLaport Taichung
- Mitsui Shopping Park LaLaport Nangang
