= Zi Yun Yan =

Temple in Qingshui, Taichung, Taiwan

- 紫雲巖
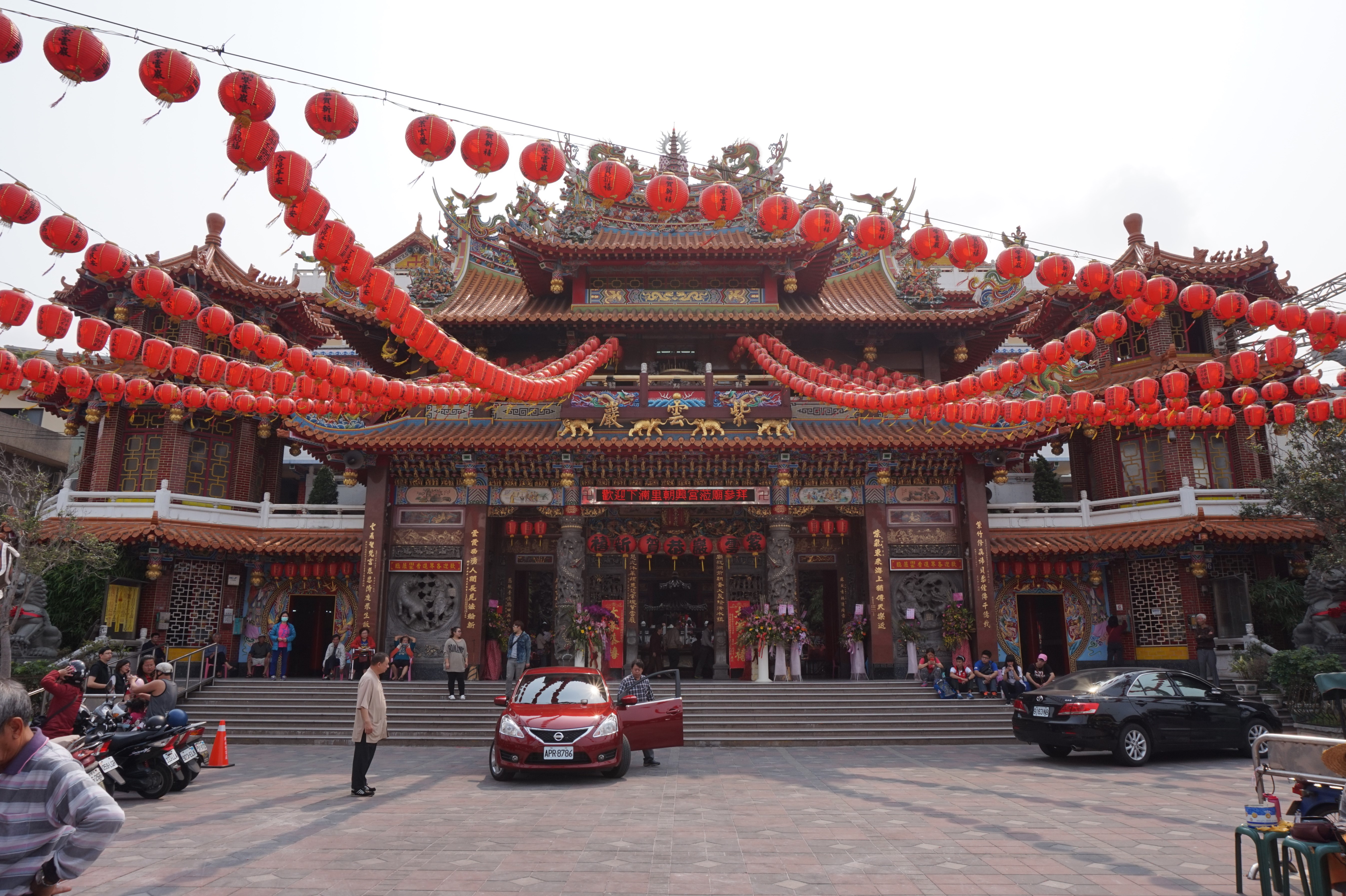

Religion
- Affiliation: Buddhism
- Deity: Guanyin

Location
- Location: Qingshui, Taichung
- Country: Taiwan
- Interactive map of Zi Yun Yan
- Coordinates: 24.2710°N 120.5793°E

Architecture
- Completed: 1662
- Direction of façade: West

Zi Yun Yan (Chinese: 紫雲巖; pinyin: Zǐyúnyán; lit. 'purple cloud temple'), alternatively romanized as Tzu Yun Yen, is a temple located in Qingshui District, Taichung, Taiwan. The temple is dedicated to Guanyin.

== History ==
According to temple officials, Zi Yun Yan was built in 1662 during Kangxi Emperor's reign in the Qing dynasty. From tradition, a traveling roofer passed by the current site, where he hung his Guanyin statue on a tree. When he left, he forgot to take the statue with him. Local residents then saw a bright light emitting from the tree, so they built a temple for worship. However, according to a Japanese survey in 1897, the temple was built in 1870.

The 1935 Shinchiku-Taichū earthquake heavily damaged the building, but this was not repaired until 1946. Between 1972 and 1980, the temple underwent a major renovation to coincide with the construction of the Port of Taichung. During this time, the temple was transformed from having only one floor to the current five-story building.

== Structure ==
Zi Yun Yan has a total of five stories and multiple altars contain many different deities. On the first floor, the main hall is dedicated to Guanyin in the middle, along with Wenshu and Puxian on the sides. On the second floor, there are halls for Huangdi, Shennong, Mazu, Koxinga, Wenchang Dijun, and others. On the third floor, there is a hall where the temple will place one of sixty Tai Sui statues in its possession. The statue changes every year according to the sexagenary cycle. A pair of three-story bell towers are placed beside the front entrance, and there is a small garden behind the temple. Across the street from the temple, there is an administration building owned by the temple that contains a museum, library, and lodging for pilgrims.

== Traditions ==
The largest festival of the year is Ghost Festival. Each year, the temple assigns one of the thirty-two villages in Qingshui as host, and the residents are tasked with preparing the offerings. In 2020, Qiaotou Village prepared 1,950 tables of offerings, which were all placed in the temple's plaza.

In the ninth month of the lunar year, a festival is held in the five villages in the Gaomei Region (near Gaomei Wetlands), where Zi Yun Yan sends out a convoy transporting a Guanyin statue named Erma (二媽) to tour the villages. According to legend, a Gaomei resident found a glowing piece of wood, which he donated to Zi Yun Yan. The temple then carved the wood into the Erma statue today.

Historically, Zi Yun Yan was a major stop on the annual Dajia Mazu Pilgrimage. However, in 2006, Zi Yan Yan was hosting a table tennis tournament on the day and turned down the procession, and the procession has never returned since. Other Mazu pilgrimages, like the Baishatun Mazu Pilgrimage, will occasionally stop at Zi Yun Yan.

Worshippers may purchase a small candle (known as guangmingdeng), in which the temple will put on display for the entire year. In 2009, there were 79,214 candles that were lit.

== Gallery ==
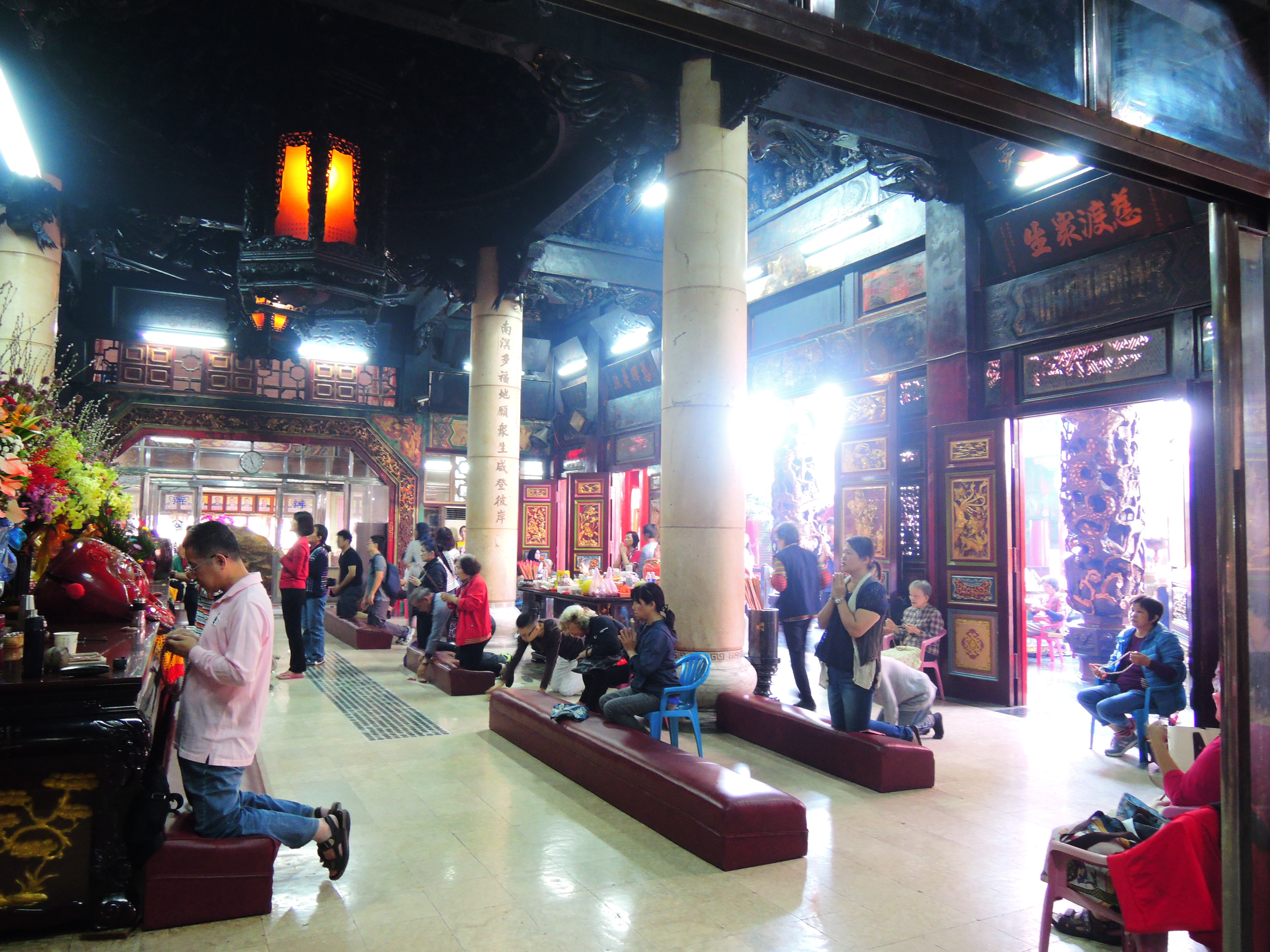
Worshippers in the main hall

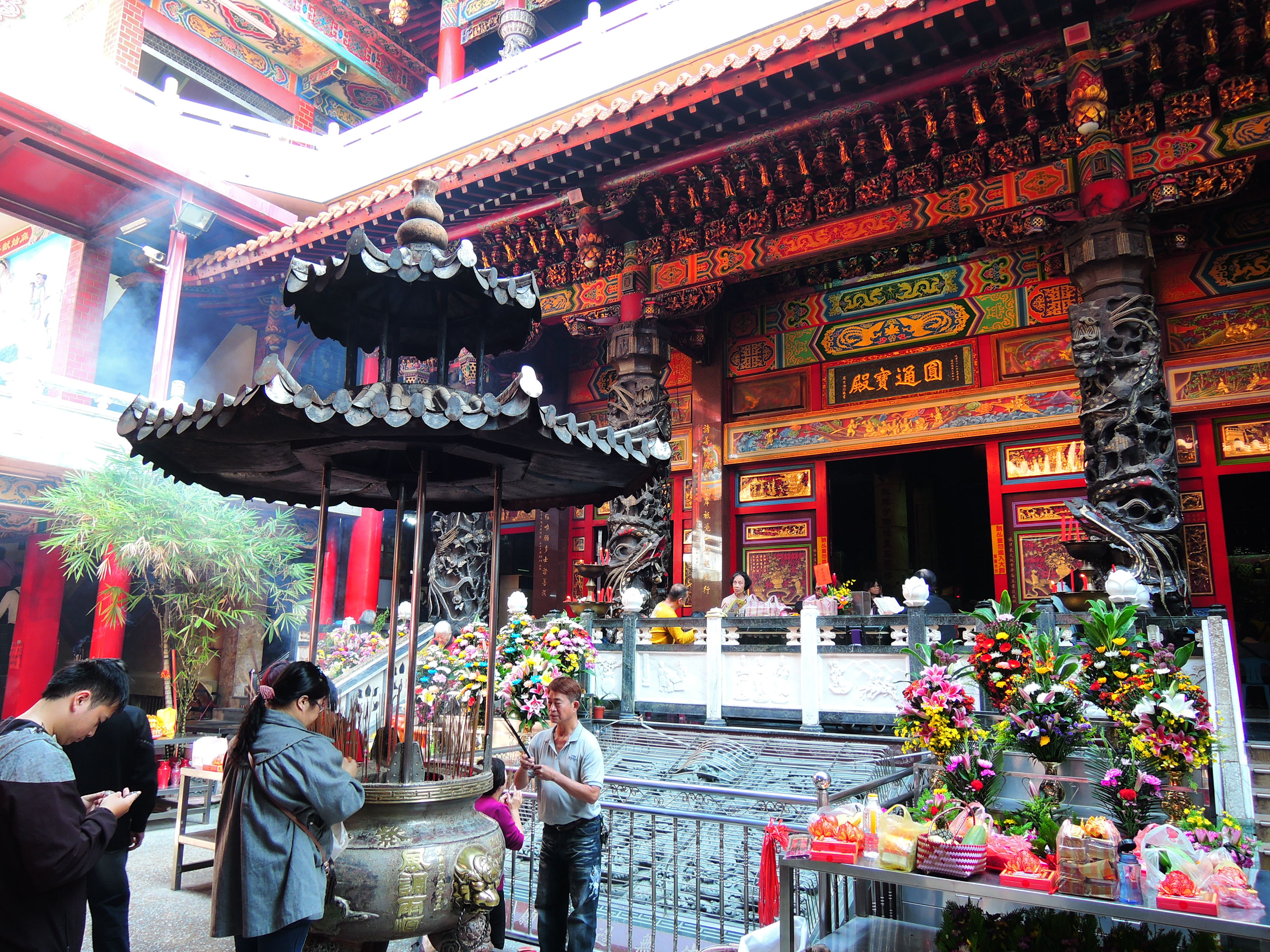
Central courtyard

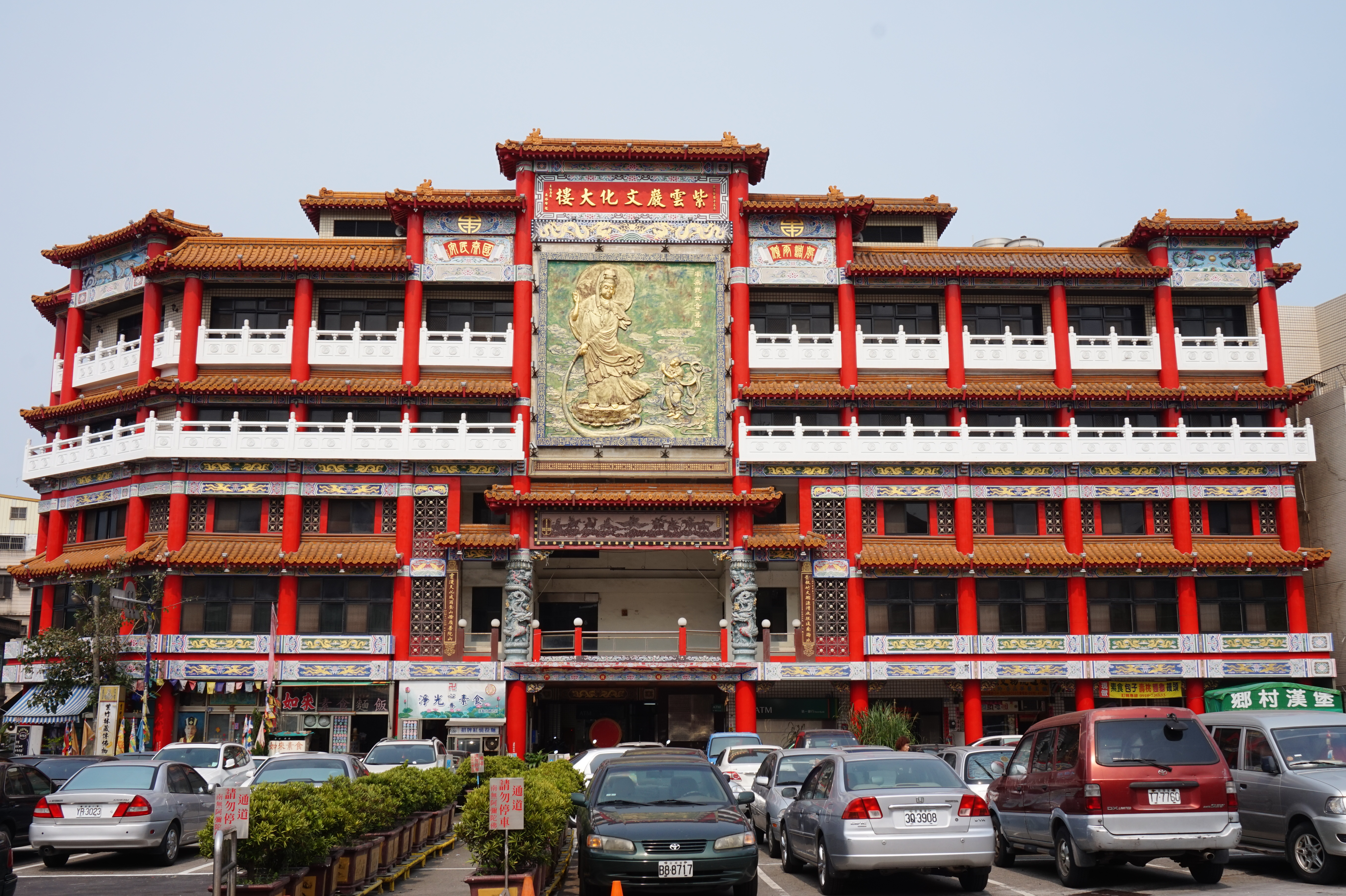
Administration building located across the street
