= Taichung Port railway station =

Railway station in Taichung, Taiwan

Coordinates: 24°18′15.8″N 120°36′8.2″E

Taichung Port station 台中港車站
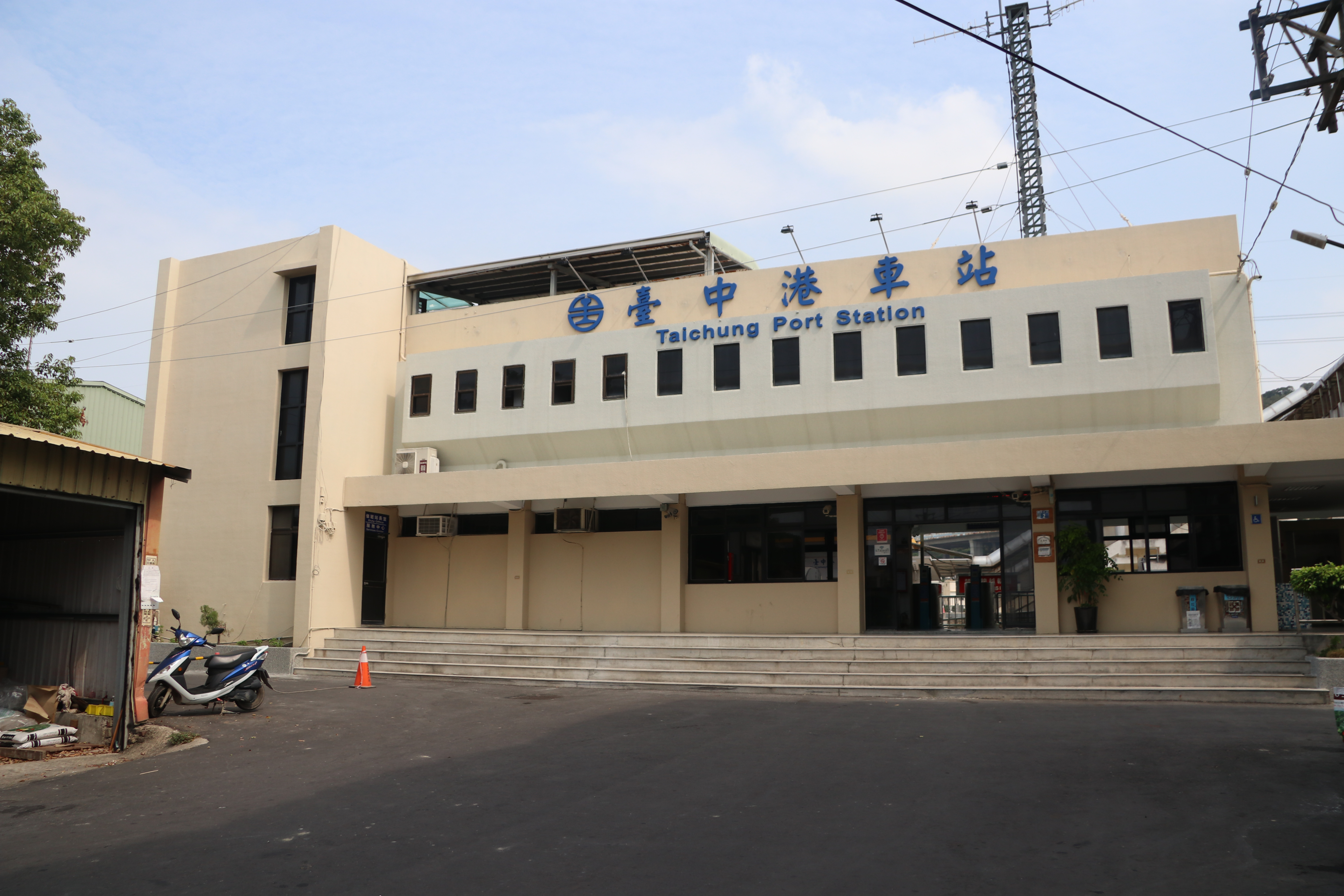

General information
- Location: Qingshui, Taichung, Taiwan
- System: Train station
- Owner: Taiwan Railway Corporation
- Operator: Taiwan Railway Corporation
- Line: Western Trunk line
- Platforms: 1 side platform, 1 island platform
- Train operators: Taiwan Railway Corporation

History
- Opened: 11 October 1922

Passengers
- 251 daily (2024)
Location

Taichung Port station (Chinese: 台中港車站; pinyin: Táizhōnggǎng Chēzhàn; Pe̍h-ōe-jī: Tâi-tiong-káng Chhia-chām), formerly known as Jianan, is a railway station on the Taiwan Railway West Coast line (Coastal line) and the Taichung Port line located in Qingshui District, Taichung, Taiwan.

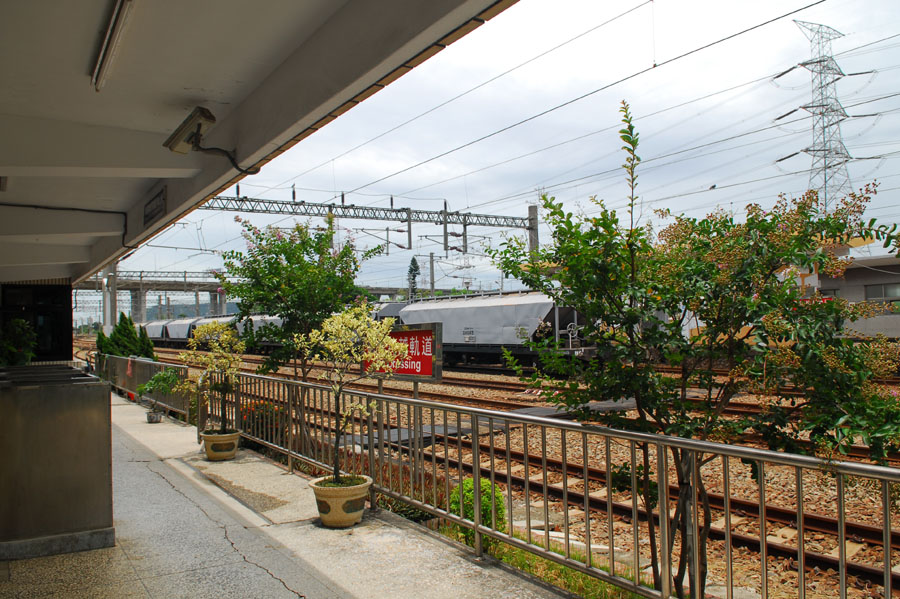
Taichung Port station platform

== History ==
The station was opened on 11 October 1922.

== Structure ==
There is one side platform and one island platform at the station.

== Service ==
Taichung Port station is only a point branching out to the Taichung Port line.

== Around the station ==
- Gaomei Lighthouse
- Gaomei Wetlands

== See also ==
- List of railway stations in Taiwan

Preceding station	Taiwan Railway	Following station
Dajia towards Keelung	Western Trunk line	Qingshui towards Pingtung
