= Qingshui District =

District of Taichung, Taiwan

Qingshui 清水區 Dingzihu
- District
- Nickname: Gomach/Niumatou (牛罵頭)
- Qingshui District in Taichung City
- Coordinates: 24°17′15″N 120°34′35″E
- Country: Taiwan
- Special municipality: Taichung City
- Divisions: List: 32 villages; 496 neighborhoods

Government
  - Mayor: Tsai Ching-sheng (蔡慶生)

Area
  - Total: 64.1709 km^{2} (24.7765 sq mi)

Population (February 2023)
  - Total: 89,266
  - Rank: 13 out of 29
  - Density: 1,391.1/km^{2} (3,602.8/sq mi)
- Postal code: 436
- Website: www.qingshui.taichung.gov.tw (in Chinese)

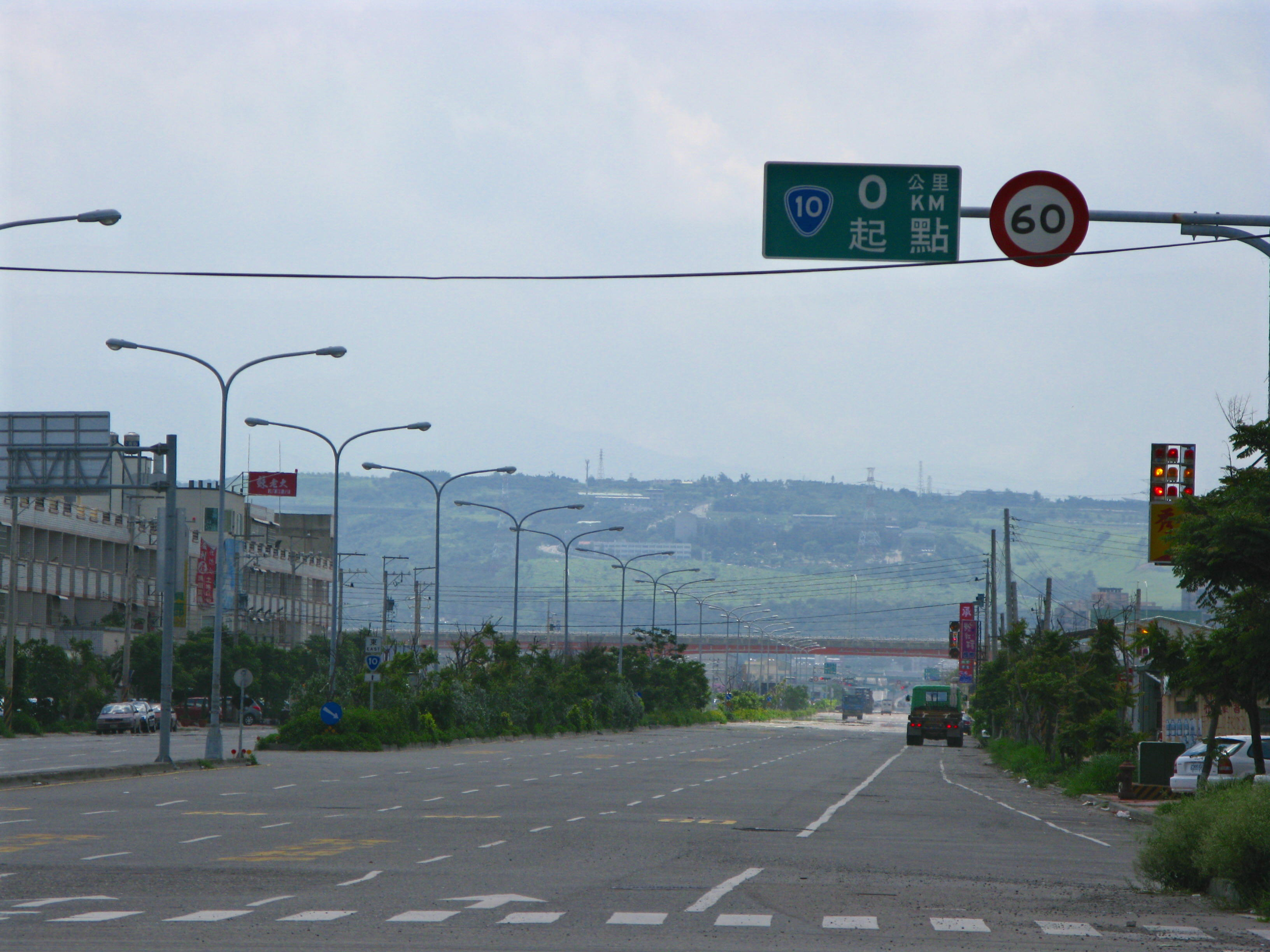
Qingshui District

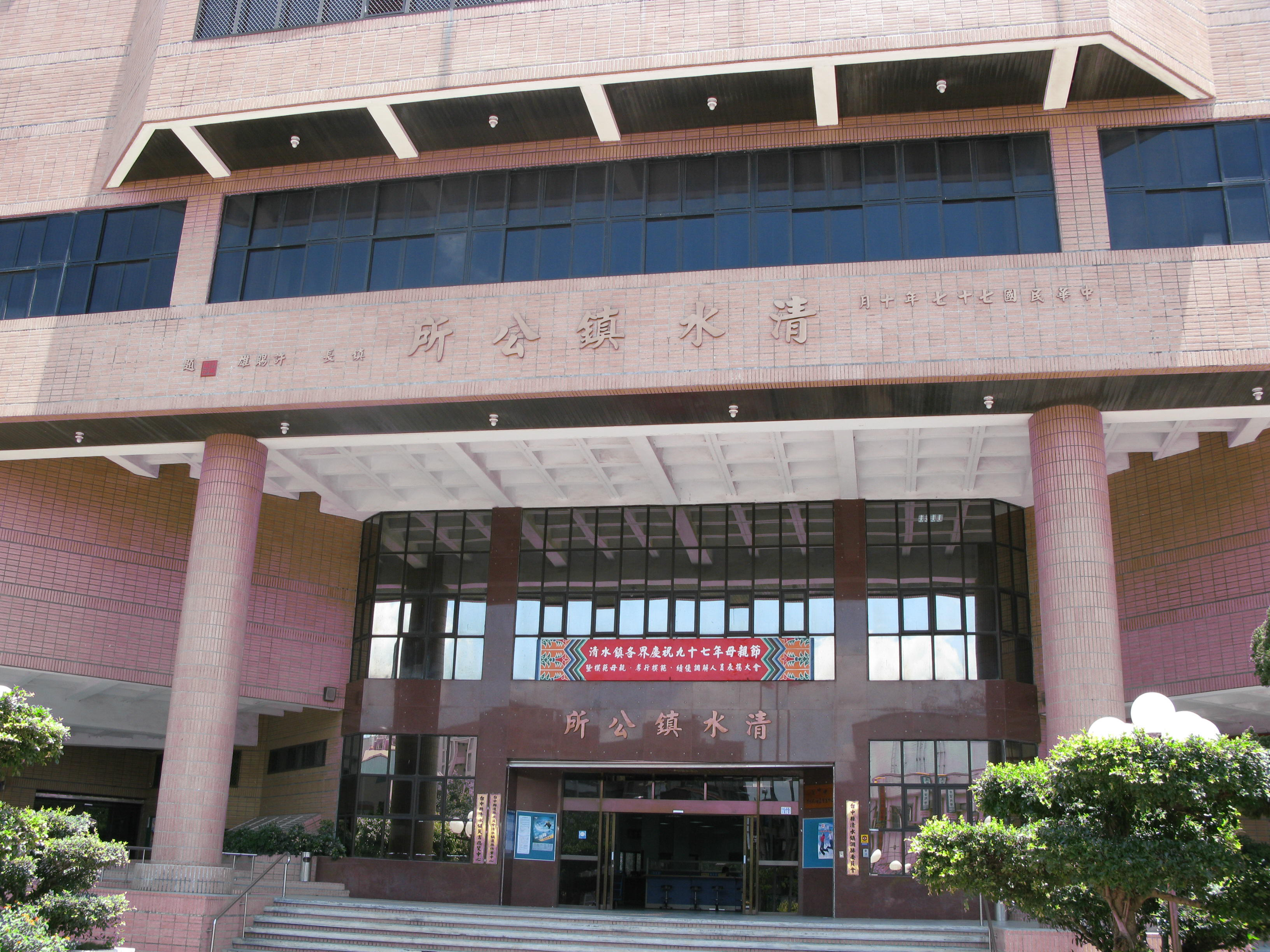
Qingshui District office

Qingshui District (Chinese: 清水區; pinyin: Qīngshuǐ Qū), also spelled as Chingshui District, is a coastal suburban district in western Taichung City, Taiwan.

== Geography ==
Qingshui is located on the Qingshui Plain of Taiwan. It borders the Taiwan Strait to the west, the Dajia River to the north, and the Dadu Plateau to the east. Qingshui shares borders with Da'an, Dajia, and Waipu to the north, Shengang to the east, and Wuqi and Shalu to the south.

== History ==
The earliest evidence of humans living in this area is from 4000 years ago in the Neolithic Age. The archaeological site is preserved in the Niumatou Site. Before the influx of the Han Chinese, this area was known as Gomach (牛罵頭) by the Papora people.

In the Qing Dynasty, the Kangxi Emperor opened up the area for Chinese settlement. During this time, the area was known as Niumatou, which is an alternative pronunciation of Gomach. The two largest families that moved into this area were the Yang and the Tsai. Today, these two surnames remain as the most prominent surnames in Qingshui.

During Japanese Rule, the name was changed to Kiyomizu Town (清水街), which was administered under Taikō District, Taichu Prefecture.

After the Nationalists took over, the Japanese name was preserved but with the Chinese pronunciation Qingshui Township. It was located within Taichung County. In 2010, Taichung County was promoted into a special municipality, and Qingshui was promoted from a "township" to a "district".

== Tourist attractions ==
- Gaomei Wetlands: a 701-acre wetland formed when an embankment was constructed for the Port of Taichung, causing the Dajia River's sediment to settle in this area.
  - Gaomei Lighthouse
- Niumatou Site: a Neolithic archaeological site dating from 4000 years ago.
- Taichung City Seaport Art Center
- Wuqi Fishing Port
- Ziyun Temple: a Buddhist temple dedicated to Guanyin, dating back to 1750 AD.
- Taichung Aquarium

== Transportation ==
Qingshui is served by the TR Qingshui and Taichung Port stations.

Qingshui is served by the following national roads:

- National Freeway 3: The Zhongang System Interchange, which connects to Freeway 4 and the Qingshui Rest Stop are located in the district.
- National Freeway 3: The Zhongang System Interchange, which connects to Freeway 3 and the Qingshui Interchange are located in the district.
- Provincial Highway 1
- Provincial Highway 10
  - Provincial Highway 10B, a branch of Provincial Highway 10
- Provincial Highway 17
- Provincial Highway 61

There is also a railway line.

== Notable people ==
- Liao Tian-ding, a Robin Hood figure during the Japanese rule.
- Cheng Yen, Buddhist bhikkhu and philosopher
- Paul Chu, physicist
- Tsai Chi-chang, vice president of Legislative Yuan
- Li Jing, TV hostess and model
- Tsai Dui, Minister of Transportation and Communication

== See also ==
- Taichung
