= Gaomei Lighthouse =

Lighthouse in Qingshui, Taichung, Taiwan

Gaomei Lighthouse Kaomei Lighthouse
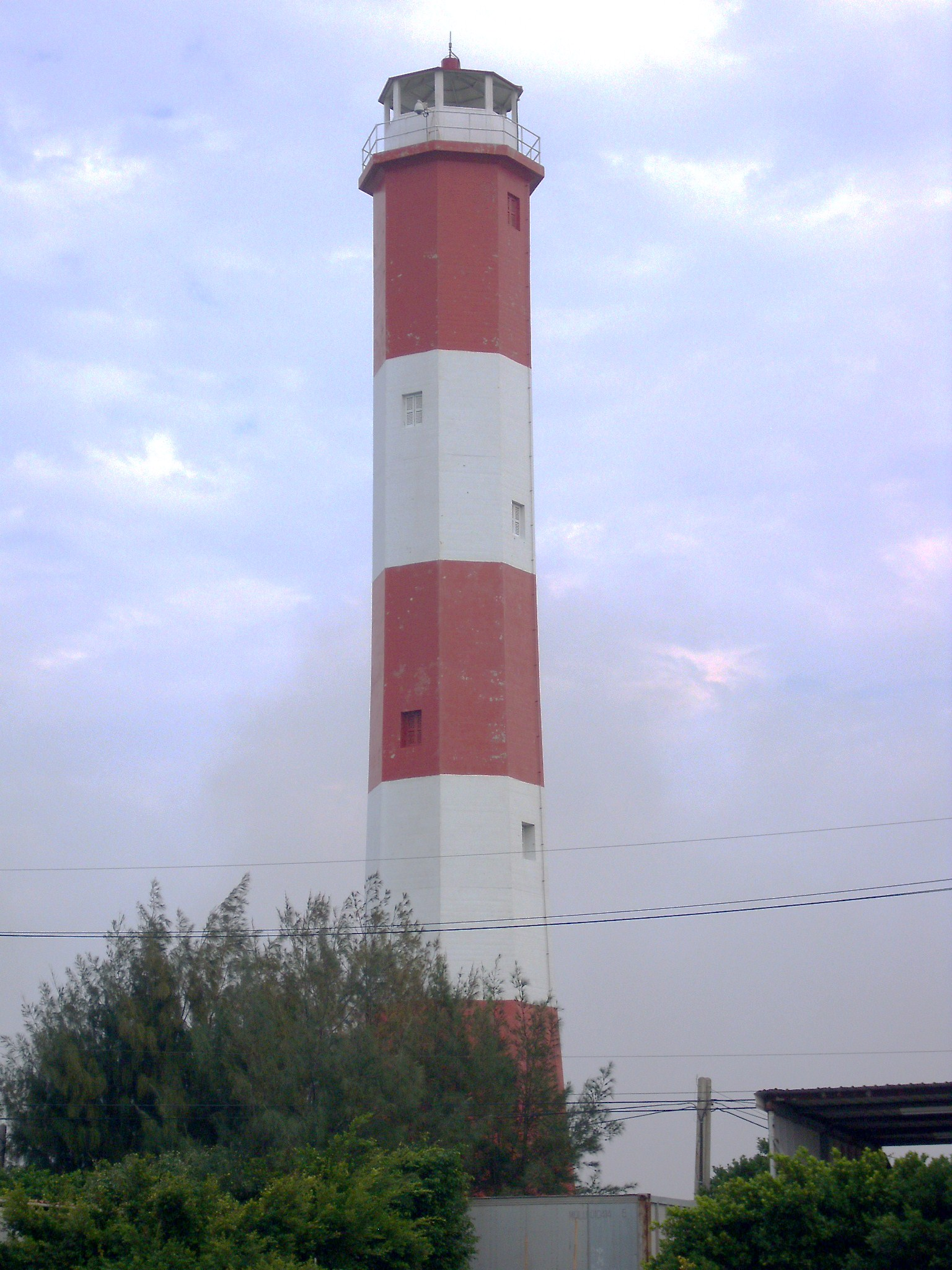
- Location: Taichung; Xitun District; Taiwan
- Coordinates: 24.312618°N 120.551242°E

Tower
- Constructed: 1967; 58 years ago
- Construction: reinforced concrete tower
- Height: 34 meters (112 ft)
- Shape: tapered octagonal tower with balcony and lantern removed to the Fangyuan lighthouse
- Markings: tower with red and white horizontal bands
- Operator: Maritime and Port Bureau
- Heritage: Historic Building of Taiwan

Light
- Focal height: 38.7 m (127 ft)
- Characteristic: used as daymark

The Gaomei Lighthouse (traditional Chinese: 高美燈塔; simplified Chinese: 高美灯塔; pinyin: Gāoměi Dēngtǎ) is a defunct lighthouse in Qingshui District, Taichung, Taiwan.

== History ==
The lighthouse was originally built in 1967, but ceased operations in 1982 when its lighting equipment was moved to the lighthouse at the Port of Taichung. Years later, it underwent renovation led by the Maritime and Port Bureau and was officially opened to tourists on 27 September 2014. It is currently managed by the Ministry of Transportation and Communications.

== Architecture ==
Built with steel-reinforced concrete, the lighthouse stands at a height of 34 meters (112 ft).

== Transportation ==
The lighthouse is accessible west from Taichung Port Station of Taiwan Railway.

== See also ==
- List of tourist attractions in Taiwan
- List of lighthouses in Taiwan
