= Mitsui Shopping Park LaLaport Nangang =

Shopping mall in Nangang, Taipei, Taiwan

- 三井LaLaport南港

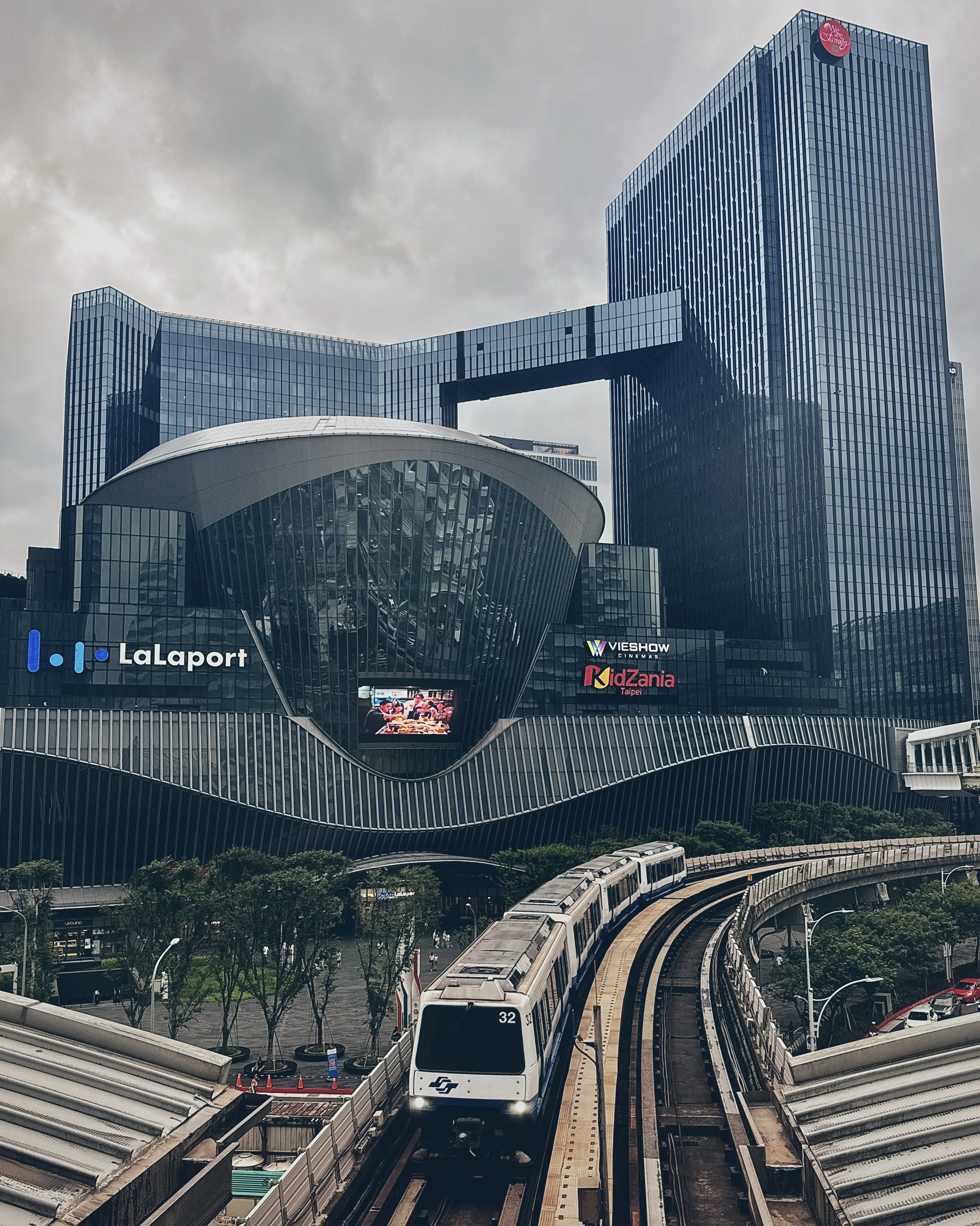
- Location: Nangang District, Taipei, Taiwan
- Coordinates: 25°3′34″N 121°37′5″E
- Address: 131 Jingmao 2nd Road, Nangang District, Taipei, Taiwan
- Opened: 20 March 2025; 19 months ago
- Manager: Mitsui & Co. Taiwan Ltd.
- Owner: Mitsui & Co. Taiwan Ltd.
- Num. of stores: 300+
- Floor area: 1,448,822 sq ft (134,600.0 m^{2})
- Floors: 6
- Public transit: Nangang Software Park metro station
- Website: Official website

Mitsui Shopping Park LaLaport Nangang is a shopping mall in Nangang District, Taipei, Taiwan. It is the first LaLaport shopping mall to be developed in Taipei, second in Taiwan after Lalaport Taichung and the fifth retail property of the Japanese real estate company Mitsui Fudosan. The mall houses approximately 300 shops and includes the largest Vieshow Cinemas store in the city. Construction of the mall began on May 23, 2019 and it was originally scheduled to open partially at the end of 2022. However, due to delays in construction and the COVID-19 pandemic, the mall only officially opened on March 20, 2025.

== Location ==
Mitsui Shopping Park LaLaport Nangang is located within a two-minute walk from Nangang Software Park metro station on the Wenhu line of Taipei Metro.

== See also ==
- List of shopping malls in Taiwan
- Mitsui Shopping Park LaLaport Taichung
- Mitsui Outlet Park Taichung Port
