= Mitsui Fudosan =

Japanese real estate developer

Mitsui Fudosan Co. Ltd.

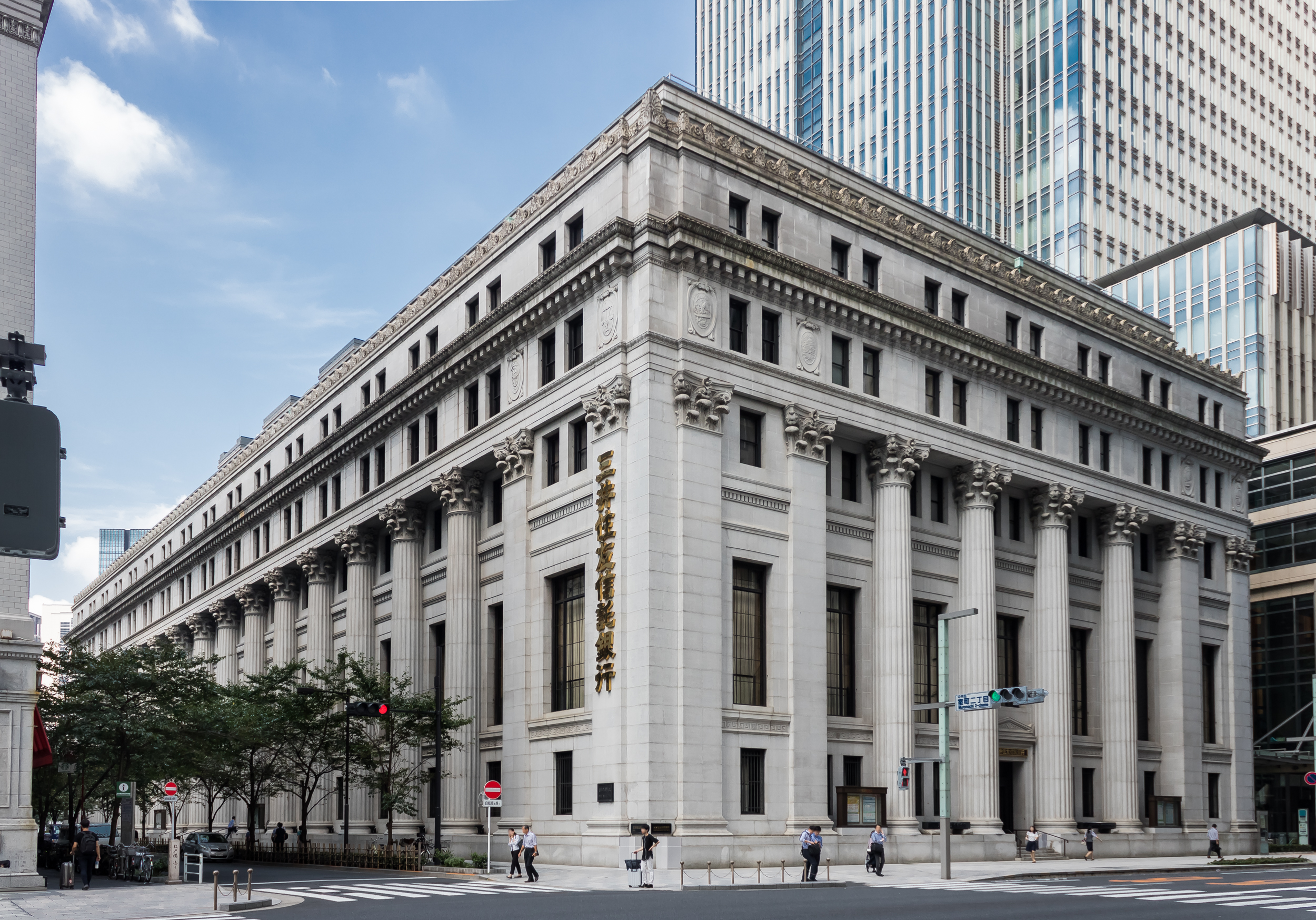
- Native name: 三井不動産株式会社
- Romanized name: Mitsui Fudōsan kabushiki gaisha
- Type: Public (KK)
- Traded as: TYO: 8801; Nikkei 225 component; TOPIX Core30 component
- Industry: Real estate
- Founded: July 15, 1941; 85 years ago
- Headquarters: Mitsui Main Building, 2-1-1 Nihonbashi-Muromachi, Chūō, Tokyo, Japan
- Key people: Masanobu Komoda (Chairman); Takashi Ueda (President & CEO)
- Revenue: ¥1,385 billion (March 31, 2010)
- Net income: ¥60 billion (March 31, 2010)
- Number of employees: 1,216 (Consolidated 15,922) (March 31, 2010)
- Website: www.mitsuifudosan.co.jp/english

The Mitsui Fudosan Co., Ltd. (三井不動産株式会社, Mitsui Fudōsan kabushiki gaisha; lit. "Mitsui Real Estate Share Company") is a major Japanese real estate developer with properties located globally. Mitsui Fudosan is one of the core companies of Mitsui Group.

== Corporate structure ==
The company is organized into four divisions.

- Office Building Division
- Real Estate Solution Services Division
- Accommodation Business Division
- Retail Properties Division

== Major projects ==
- In Tokyo, Mitsui undertook a major redevelopment project in the Nihonbashi district, where group founder Takatoshi Mitsui had his kimono shop during the 17th century. Mitsui also developed the "Gran Tokyo North Tower" office building at Tokyo Station.
- In New York City, Mitsui's first major project was the 2.3 million square foot Exxon Building (1251 Avenue of the Americas), which it acquired in the 1980s. It subsequently engaged in several other projects in the city together with local partners. It has announced plans to invest up to $1.25 billion in the 51-story 50 Hudson Yards tower as part of the Hudson Yards Redevelopment Project, which would be the largest overseas project by a Japanese real estate company in history.
- In Los Angeles, CA. Mitsui's first major project is a 42-story, 530 ft residential tower in the financial district of Downtown Los Angeles. The Figueroa Eight, is set to open for lease in late 2023.
- In Honolulu, Hawaii, Mitsui owns and operates the ionic Halekulani hotel on Waikiki Beach.
- In China, it launched Mitsui Shopping Park LaLaport Shanghai Jinqiao in Shanghai, the first LaLaport to open outside of Japan.
- In Taiwan, it launched Mitsui Outlet Park Linkou in 2016, Mitsui Outlet Park Taichung Port in 2018 and Mitsui Outlet Park Tainan in 2022; as well as Mitsui Shopping Park LaLaport Taichung in 2023 and Mitsui Shopping Park LaLaport Nangang in 2025.
- In Malaysia, Sepang, Mitsui had launched the Mitsui Outlet Park KLIA Sepang which was opened in July 2015, while the second phase of the outlet mall was opened in February 2018. In Kuala Lumpur, Mitsui had launched its first LaLaport mall in Southeast Asia known as Mitsui Shopping Park LaLaport Bukit Bintang City Centre located within the Bukit Bintang City Centre (BBCC) development, in collaboration with BBCC Development Sdn Bhd under a joint-venture agreement. Another upcoming project known as Mitsui Serviced Suites will also be constructed as part of Phase 2 of the BBCC's master plan.

== Global network ==
Outside of Japan, the company currently owns 12 branch offices.

- Mitsui Fudosan America, Inc.
- Halekulani Corporation
- Mitsui Fudosan (U.K.) Ltd.
- Mitsui Fudosan (Asia) Pte. Ltd.
- Mitsui Fudosan (Shanghai) Consulting Co., Ltd.
- Mitsui Fudosan Consulting (Beijing) Co., Ltd.
- Mitsui Fudosan Consulting (Guangzhou) Co., Ltd.
- Mitsui Fudosan (Asia) Malaysia Sdn. Bhd.
- Mitsui Fudosan Australia Pty. Ltd.
- Mitsui Fudosan Asia (Thailand) Co., Ltd.
- Mitsui Fudosan Taiwan Co., Ltd.
- Mitsui Fudosan Co., Ltd. Hong Kong Branch

== See also ==
- Hara Model Railway Museum, a model railway museum in Yokohama managed by Mitsui Fudosan
- Snoopy Concert
- The Oriental Land Company
