= Taichung City Seaport Art Center =

Art center in Qingshui, Taichung, Taiwan

- 臺中市立港區藝術中心
- Interactive map of the Taichung City Seaport Art Center area

General information
- Type: art center
- Architectural style: Southern Fujian
- Location: Qingshui, Taichung, Taiwan
- Coordinates: 24°16′14.5″N 120°33′27.8″E
- Groundbreaking: 1993
- Opened: March 2000

Technical details
- Floor area: 30,394 m^{2}

Website
- Official website

The Taichung City Seaport Art Center (traditional Chinese: 臺中市立港區藝術中心; simplified Chinese: 台中市立港区艺术中心; pinyin: Táizhōng Shìlì Gǎng Qū Yìshù Zhōngxīn) is an art center in Qingshui District, Taichung, Taiwan.

== History ==
The construction of the center began in 1993. It was then officially opened in March 2000.

== Architecture ==
The center was constructed with a Southern Fujian architectural style and courtyard space with a total floor space of 30,394 m^{2}. It consists of the exhibition hall, concert hall, Taichung City artists archives, conference hall, recreation area and open air stage, arts and crafts classrooms and administration offices.

== Transportation ==
The center is accessible within walking distance northwest of Qingshui Station of Taiwan Railway.
