= Wuqi Fishing Port =

Fishing port in Qingshui, Taichung, Taiwan

Wuqi Fishing Port 梧棲漁港
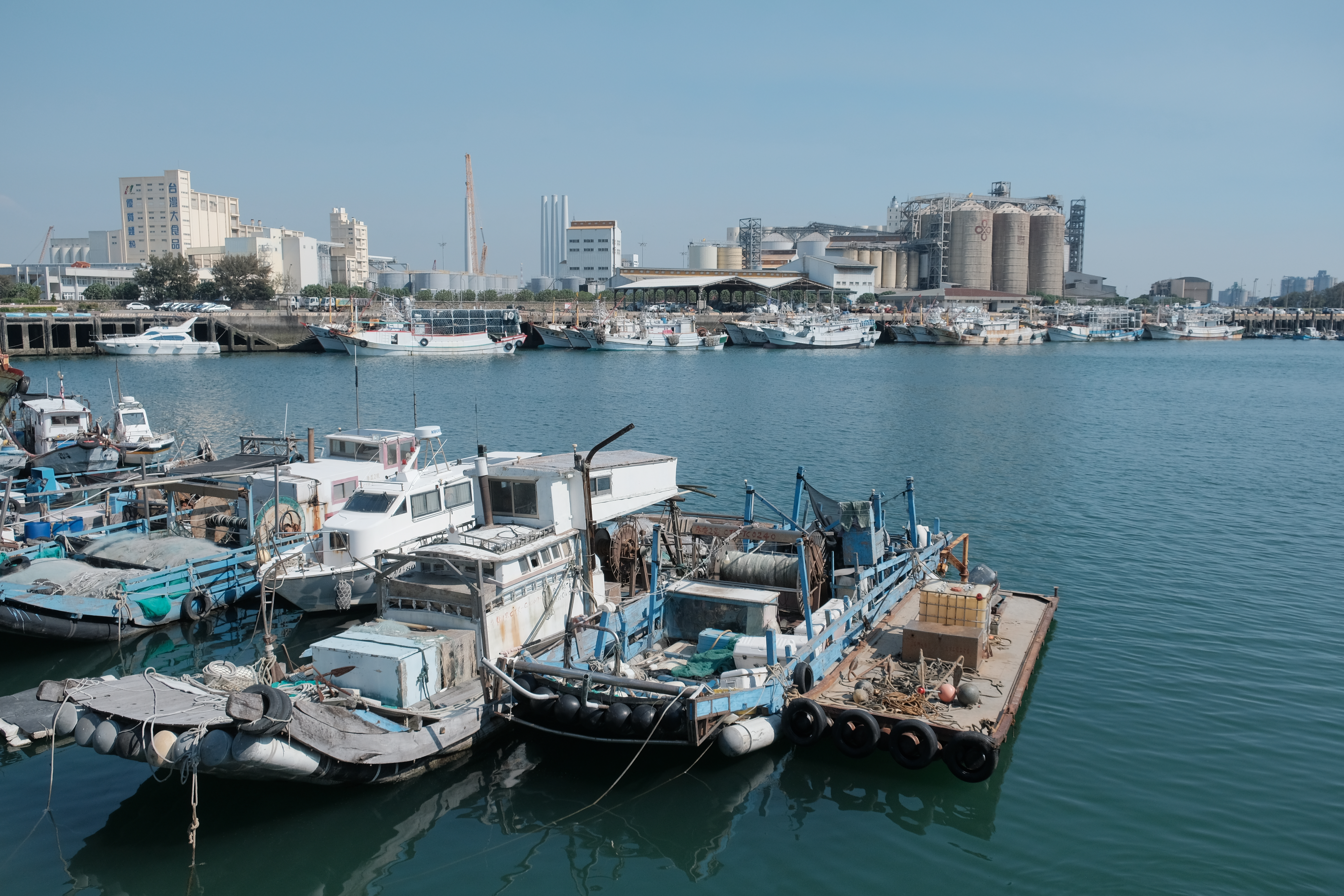
- Interactive map of Wuqi Fishing Port 梧棲漁港
- Location in Taiwan

Location
- Location: Qingshui, Taichung, Taiwan
- Coordinates: 24°17′35.5″N 120°31′14.6″E

Details
- Opened: 1989
- Type of harbour: fishing port

The Wuqi Fishing Port (traditional Chinese: 梧棲漁港; simplified Chinese: 梧栖渔港; pinyin: Wúqī Yúgǎng) is a fishing port and fish market in Qingshui District, Taichung, Taiwan. The port is part of the Port of Taichung.

== History ==
The fishing port was opened in 1989.

== Features ==
The port features the fish trading area, food center, recreational park by the sea, a sculpture park, parking lots and yacht wharf.

== Transportation ==
The port is accessible west from Qingshui Station of Taiwan Railway.

== See also ==
- Port of Taichung
- Taichung Aquarium
