= Taichung Aquarium =

Coordinates: 24.2968°N 120.5197°E

The Taichung Aquarium is a public aquarium in Taichung, Taiwan, located near Wuqi Fishing Port in Qingshui District.

== History ==
The project began in 2012. Taichung mayor Jason Hu originally planned it to be a conservation center. Under mayor Lin Chia-lung the city decided to make the project a full aquarium. The project was criticized in 2021 for still not having finished a decade after it began.

Construction was completed in 2023 but the city was unable to find a commercial operator for the aquarium.

In 2024, mayor Lu Shiow-yen said that the aquarium would open in 2025.

In 2025, it was announced that a commercial operator for the aquarium had been contracted. The Aquarium opened in August 2025.

== Exhibits and facilities ==
The aquarium features an open design. There is a large ocean tank on the first floor, a penguin exhibit on the second, exhibits themed around the Dajia River on the third floor, and a wetland exhibit as well as a large garden eel tank on the fourth. The aquarium also has a wildlife rescue and rehabilitation center.
