= Mitsui Outlet Park Linkou =

Shopping mall in Linkou, New Taipei, Taiwan

- Mitsui Outlet Park 林口

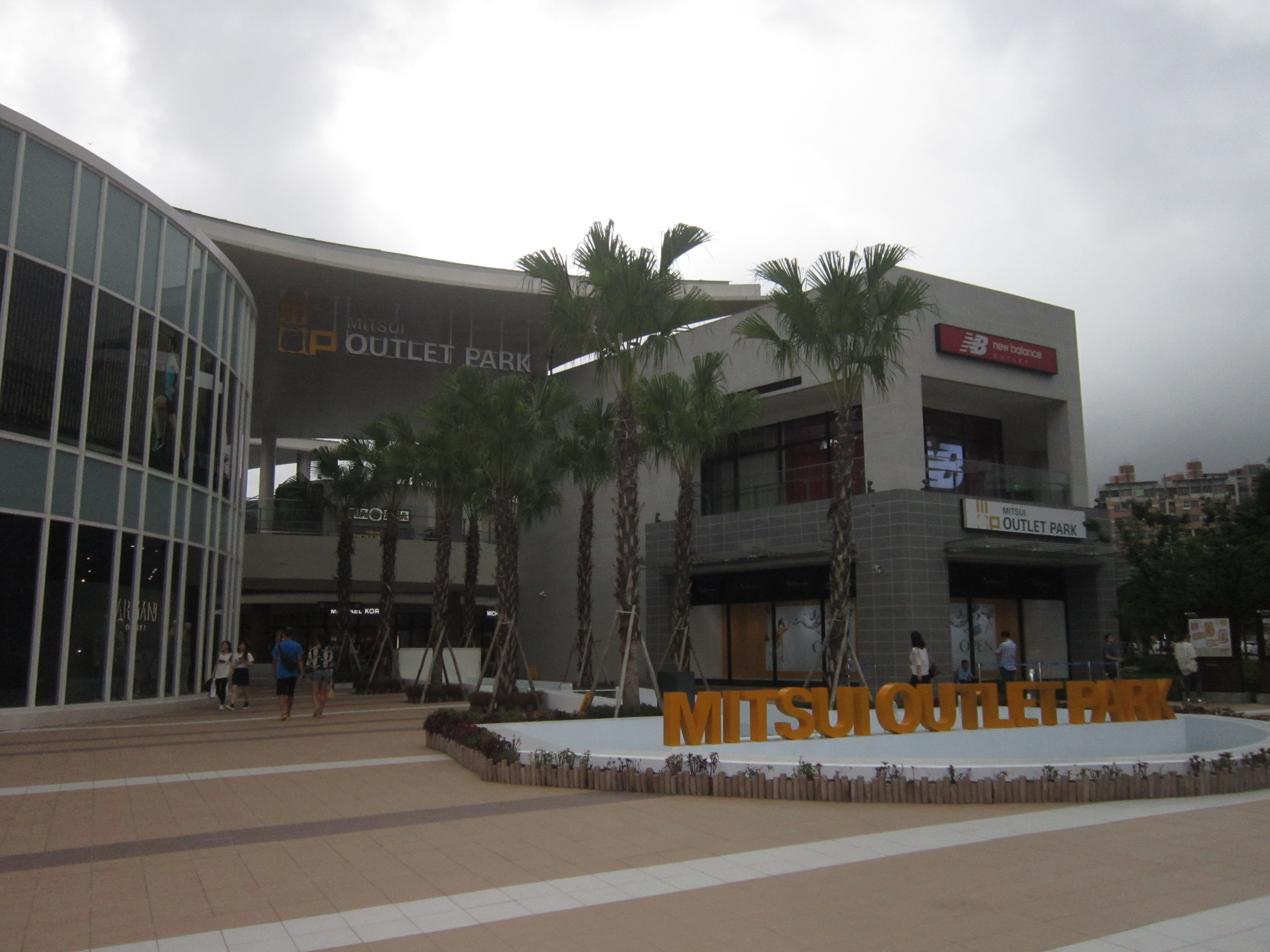
- Location: Linkou District, New Taipei City, Taiwan
- Coordinates: 25°4′16.1″N 121°21′49.9″E
- Opened: 27 January 2016
- Developer: San Zhong Gang Outlet Co., Ltd.
- Manager: Mitsui & Co. Taiwan Ltd.
- Owner: Mitsui & Co. Taiwan Ltd.
- Architect: Outlet store
- Num. of stores: 220
- Floor area: 45,000 m^{2} (480,000 sq ft)
- Parking: 2000
- Public transit: Linkou metro station
- Website: www.mop.com.tw

The Mitsui Outlet Park Linkou (Chinese: Mitsui Outlet Park 林口) is an outlet store in Linkou District, New Taipei City, Taiwan. With a total of 220 brands, construction of the mall started in April 2014 and it officially opened on January 27, 2016. It is Mitsui Fudosan's third overseas base.

== Facilities ==
The outlet is owned and operated by Mitsui & Co. Taiwan Ltd. It has a mix of 220 brands and various restaurants. Some of the shops include Shiatzy Chen, Timberland, Superdry, Nike, and Puma. The cinema inside the mall has a total of 9 theaters with 1772 seats, including a 4DX theater and two new humanistic concept theaters "Mappa". It adopts a full 4K theater specification to achieve image projection quality.

== Location ==
The outlet mall is located in close proximity to the Linkou metro station along the Taoyuan International Airport MRT.

== Gallery ==
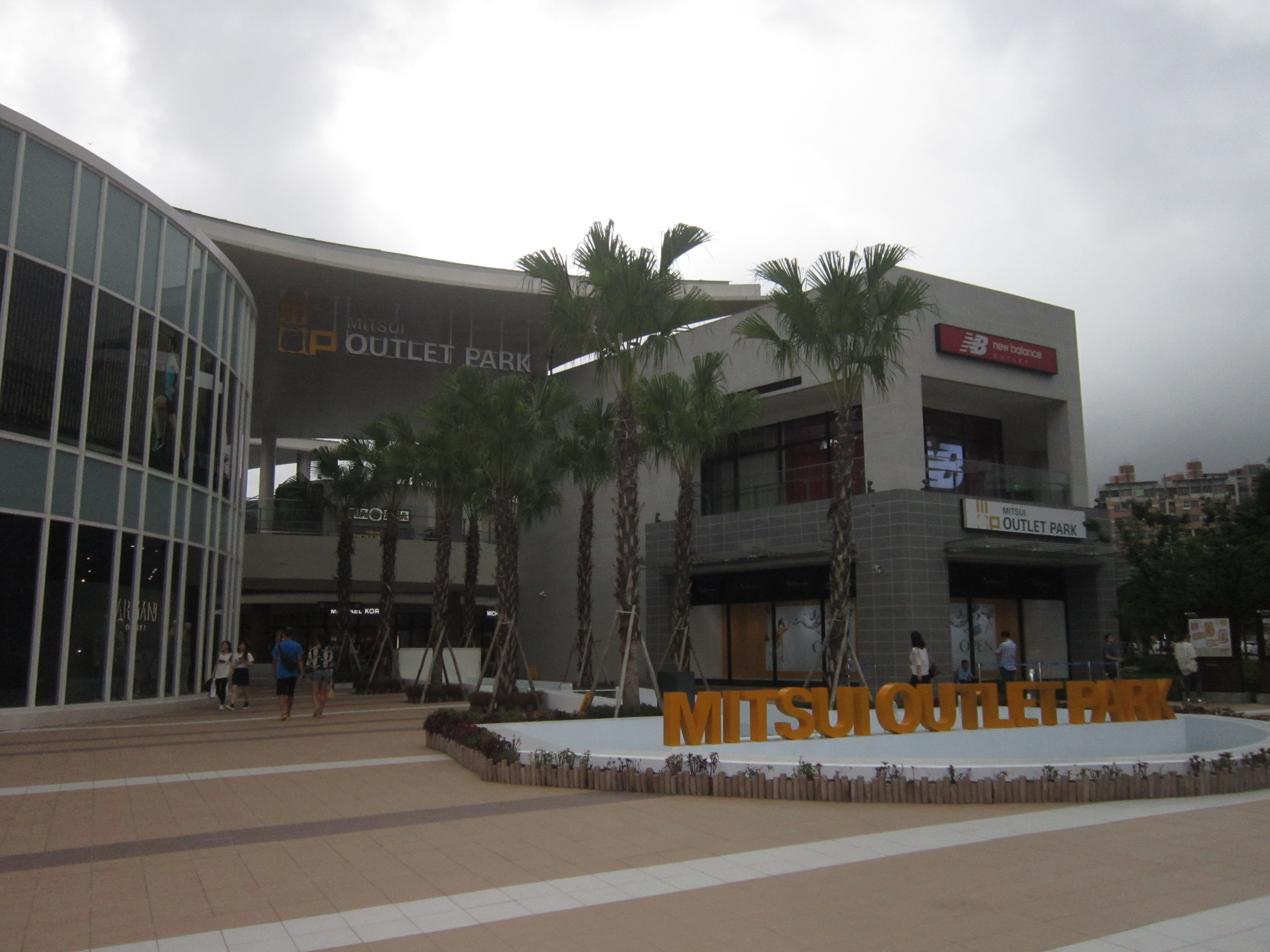
Exterior

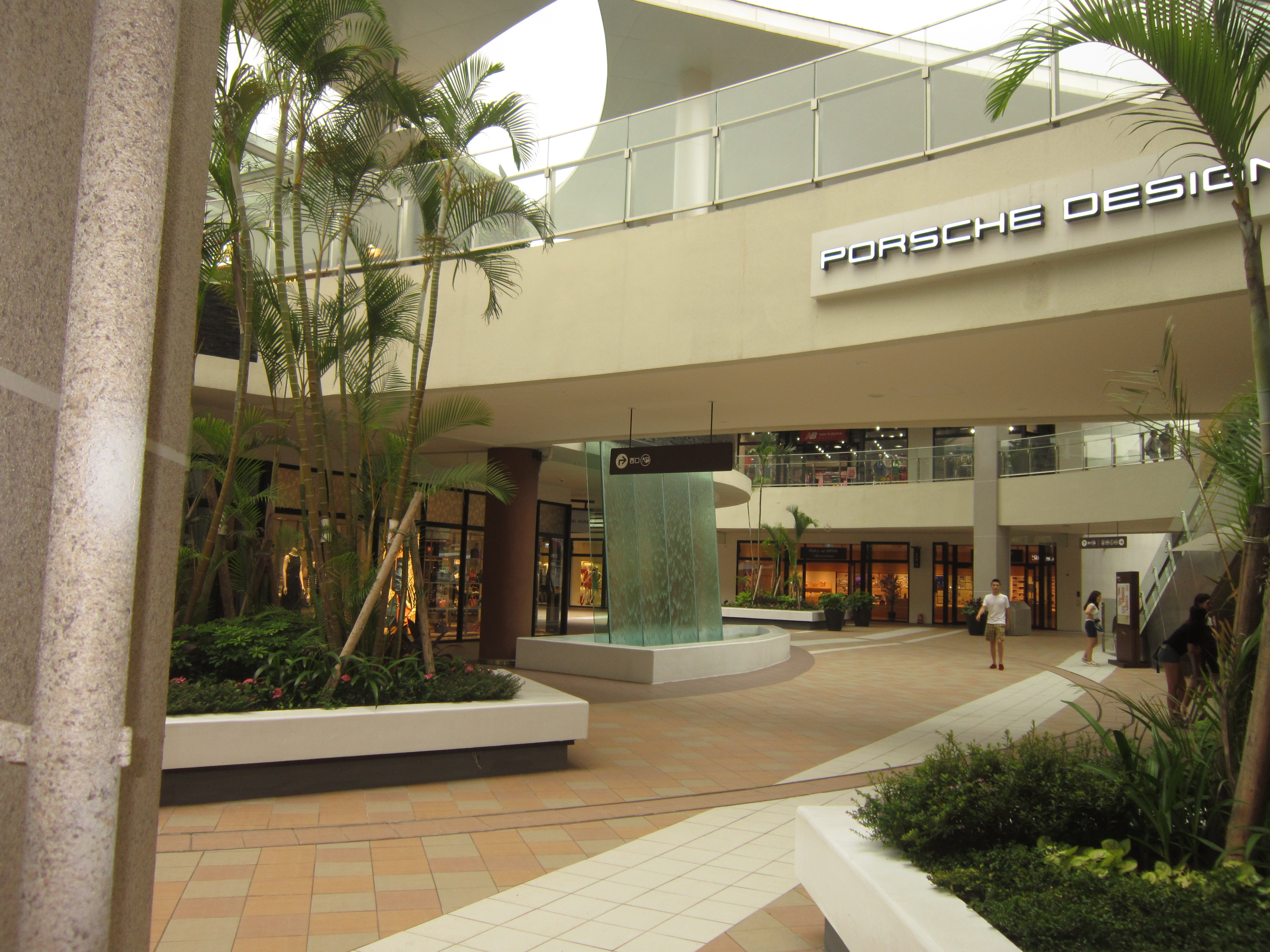
Interior

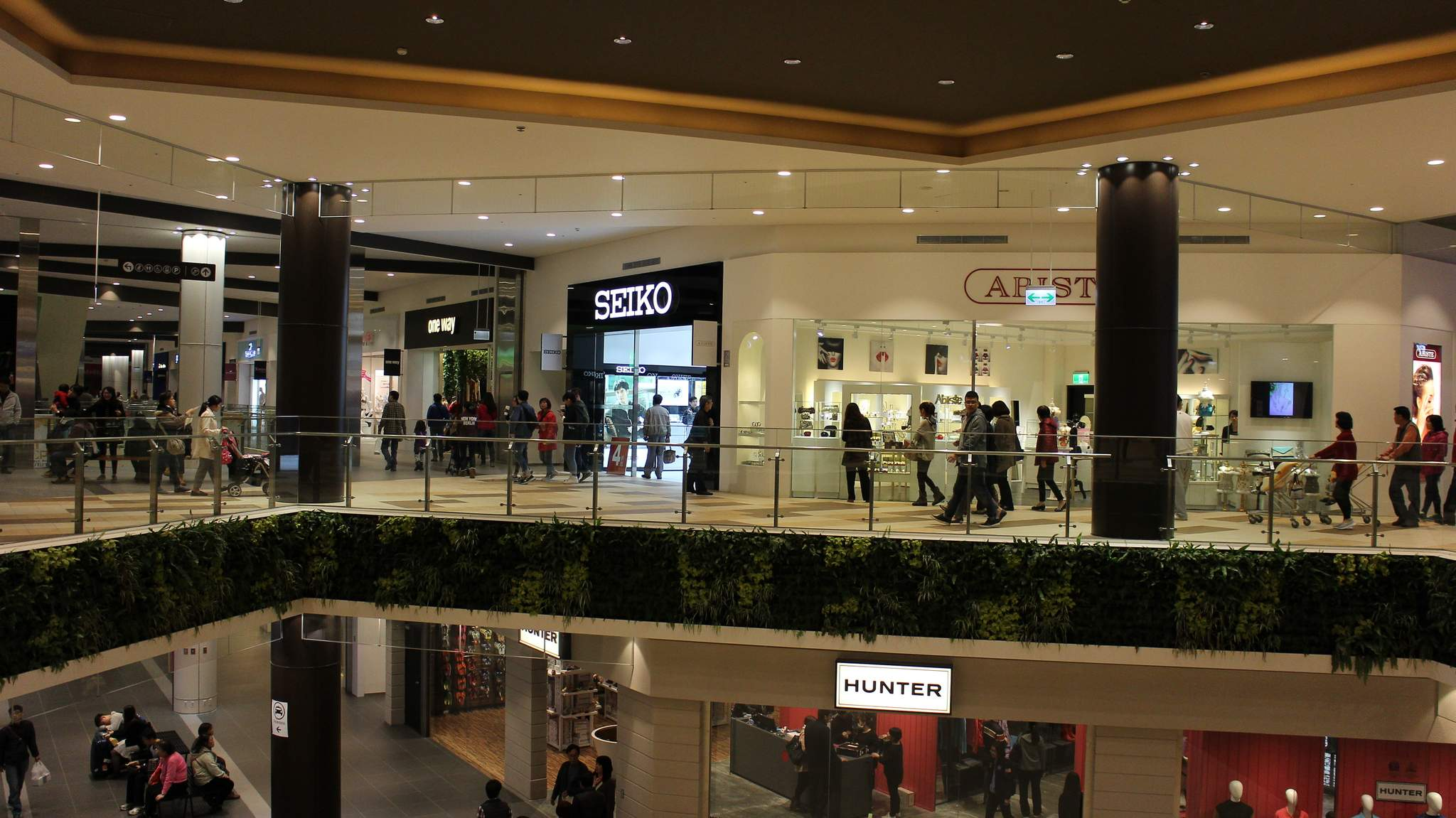
2nd Floor

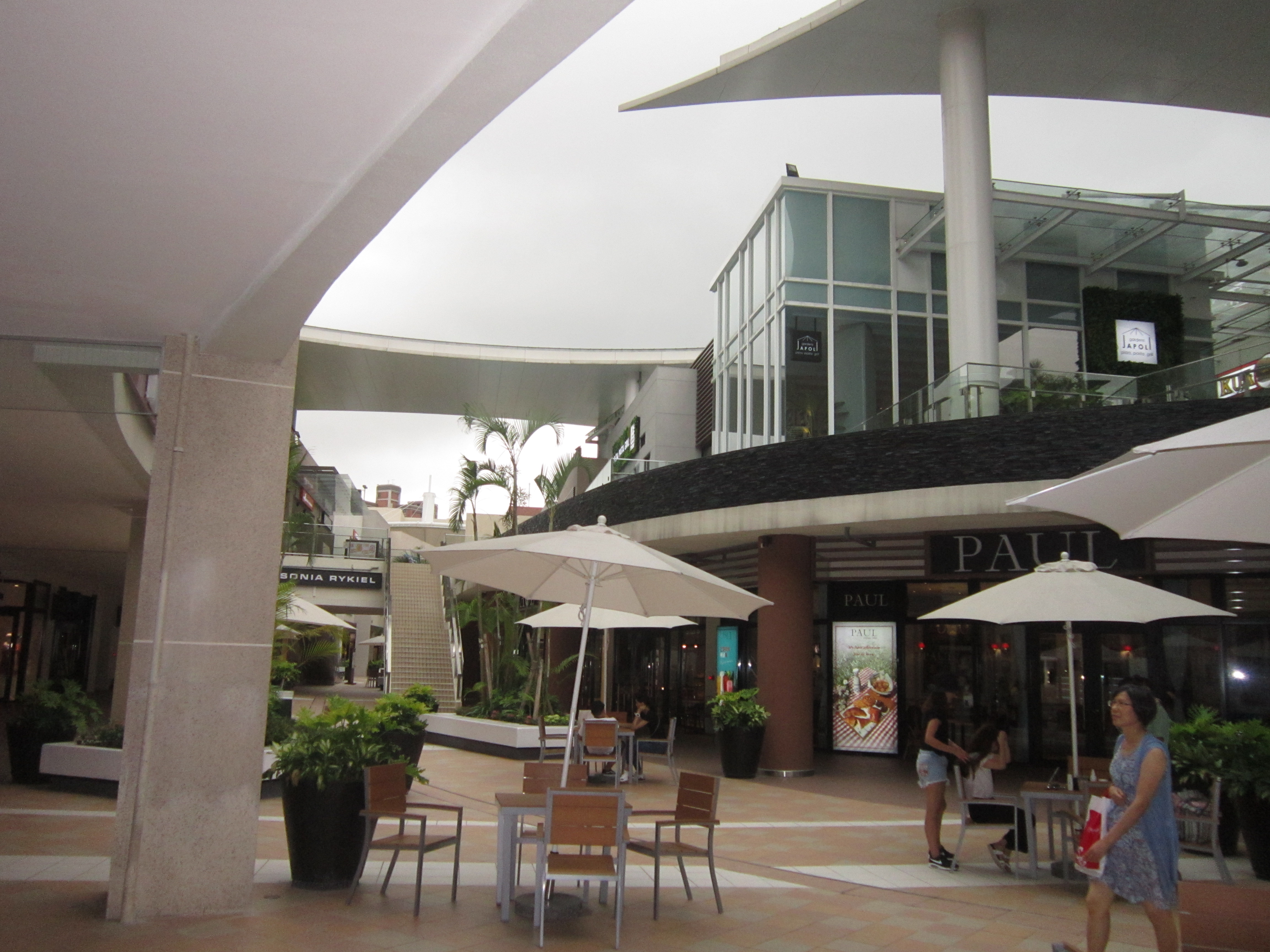
Interior

== See also ==
- List of tourist attractions in Taiwan
- Mitsui Outlet Park Taichung
- Linkou District
