= Haotian Temple =

Temple in Taichung, Taiwan

- 浩天宮
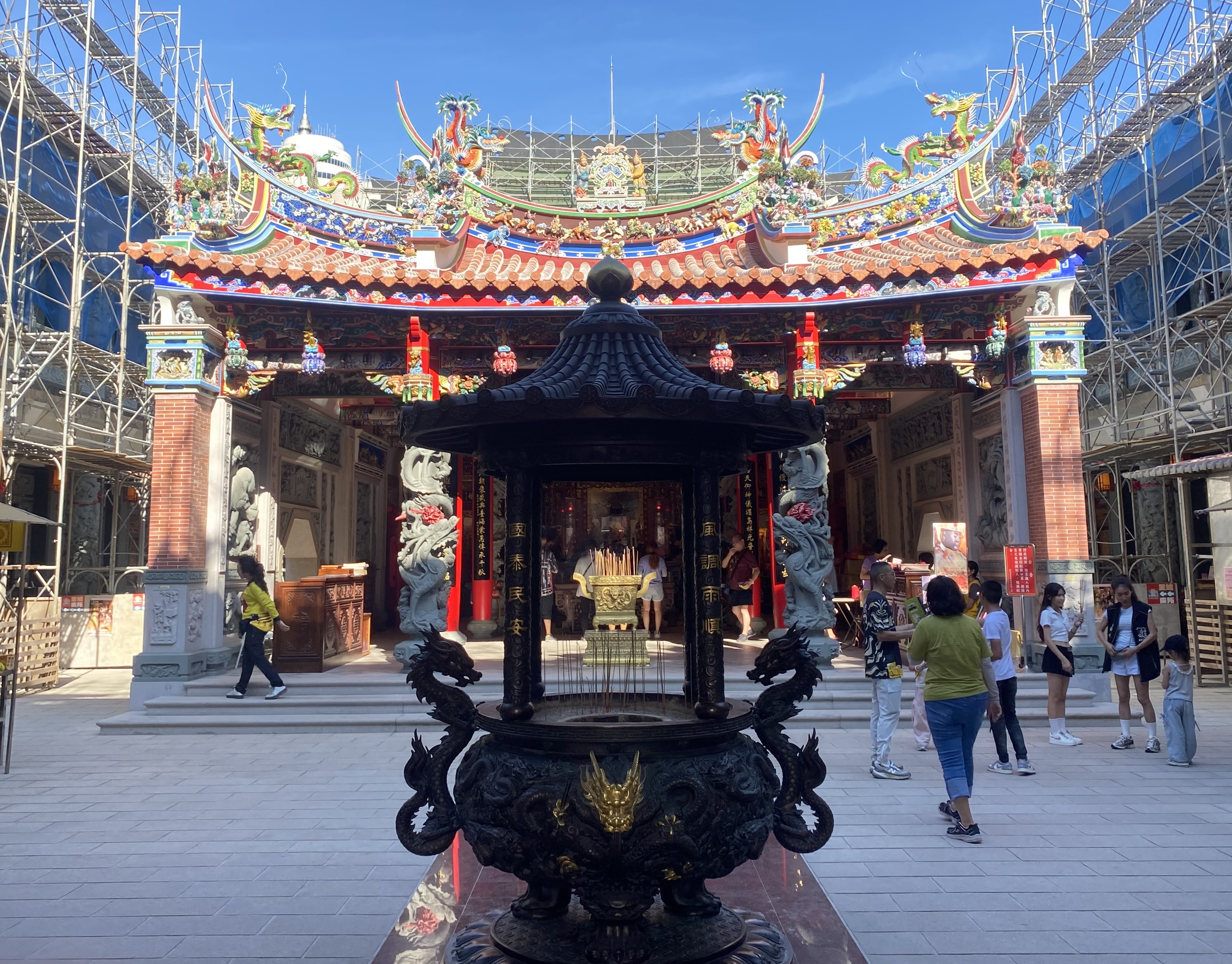
- Exterior of the temple

Religion
- Affiliation: Taoism
- Deity: Mazu

Location
- Location: Wuqi, Taichung
- Country: Taiwan
- Interactive map of Haotian Temple
- Coordinates: 24.2458°N 120.5399°E

Architecture
- Completed: 1856
- Direction of façade: West

Dazhuang Haotian Temple (HTG) (Chinese: 大庄浩天宮; pinyin: Dàzhuāng Hàotiān Gōng) is a temple located in Dazhuang, Wuqi District, Taichung, Taiwan. The temple is dedicated to the sea goddess Mazu.

== History ==
Haotian Temple was founded in 1738 by Hakka settlers in Chencuozhuang, a village north of the current site, where it was known as Mazu Temple (媽祖厝). In 1856, the temple was moved south to Dazhuang and renamed to Haotian Temple. A front hall was added in 1895, and the entire temple was renovated in 1936. In 1949, the military briefly occupied the temple and damaged the Qianliyan and Shunfeng'er statues. Between 1962 and 1977, a series of construction projects expanded the temple into its current form today.

On 2 March 2010, the Taichung County Government designated Haotian Temple as a historic building. Then, on 14 December 2014, a groundbreaking ceremony was held to renovate the temple; as of June 2020, the process is still ongoing.

== Worship ==
Haotian Temple is in possession of seven Mazu statues. Out of these, the statue known as "Third Mazu" (三媽) is the original statue of the temple during its founding. It is currently located in the nearby Deshun Temple and is only brought back on special occasions. Every other year, "Third Mazu" is carried by worshippers on a pilgrimage to Chaotian Temple in Beigang, Yunlin entirely on foot. On the years without a pilgrimage, Haotian Temple holds a parade where Mazu tours the fifty-three villages in its territory.

Aside from being known as the "Dazhuang Mazu" (大庄媽), the Mazu worshipped in Haotian Temple is also nicknamed the "Water Diving Mazu" (潛水媽). According to legend, during a pilgrimage to Chaotian Temple in Beigang, ferrymen on the Zhuoshui River greedily raised their price. While members of the procession scrambled to get the money, Mazu appeared and lowered the river's water, allowing the procession to cross on foot, which led to the nickname.

== In popular culture ==
Haotian Temple was used as a filming location for the television series Lee's Family Reunion and the 2012 movie Din Tao: Leader of the Parade. Super Night Club, a variety show on SET Taiwan, has also visited the temple in an episode.
