= Zhenwu Temple =

Temple in Taichung, Taiwan

- 真武宮
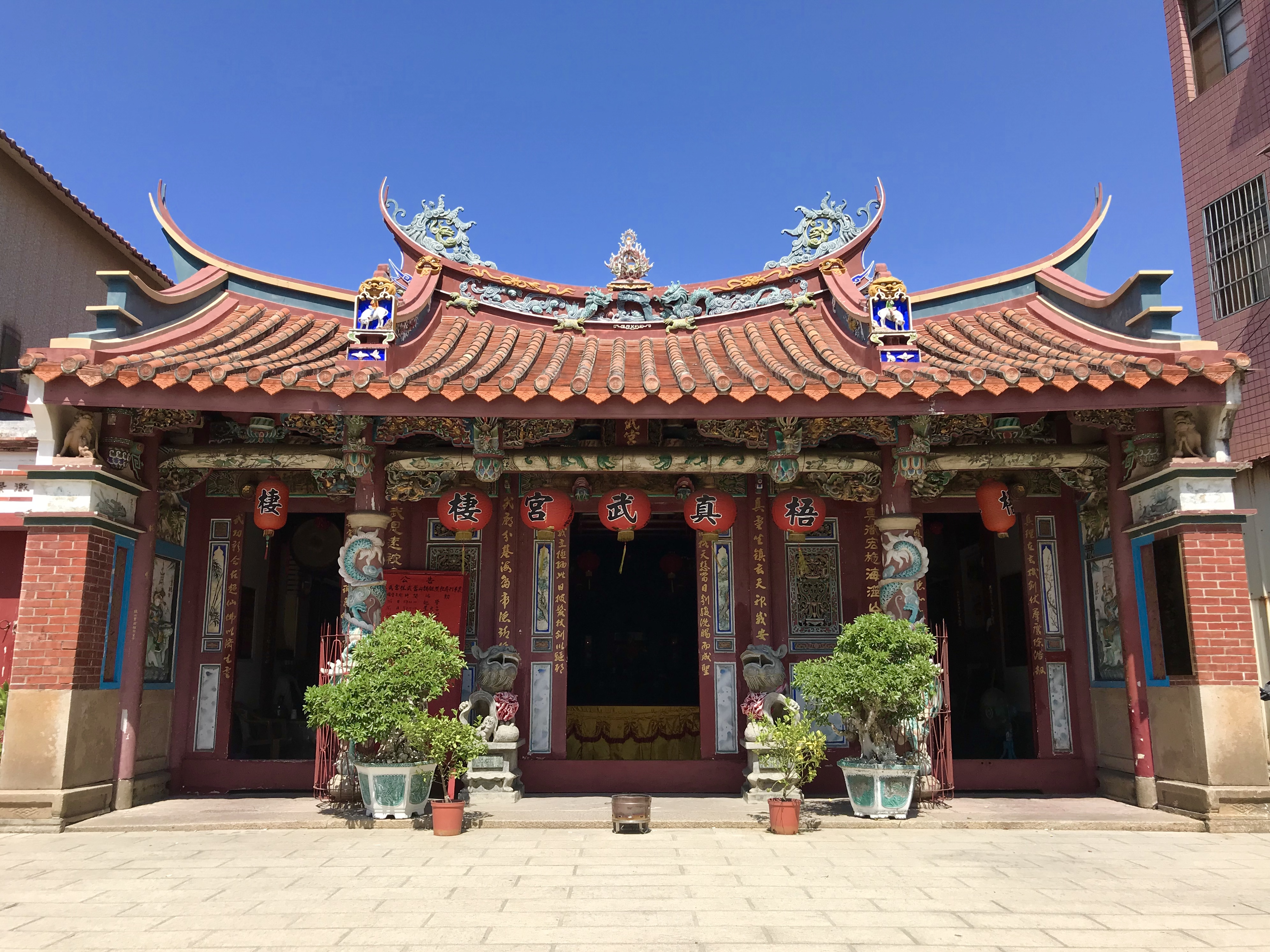
- Exterior of the temple

Religion
- Affiliation: Taoism
- Deity: Xuanwu

Location
- Location: Wuqi, Taichung
- Country: Taiwan
- Interactive map of Zhenwu Temple
- Coordinates: 24.2567°N 120.5290°E

Architecture
- Completed: 1849
- Direction of façade: West

Wuqi Zhenwu Temple (Chinese: 梧棲真武宮; pinyin: Wúqī Zhēnwǔ Gōng) is a Taoist temple located in Wuqi District, Taichung, Taiwan. The temple is dedicated to the Taoist deity, Xuantian Shangdi.

== History ==
Wuqi has a large population belonging to the Tsai clan (蔡), which originally came from Liantang Village in Quanzhou, Fujian. In 1849, Zhenwu Temple was built in by the owners of a trading company named Jíshùnhào (集順號) owned by the Tsai clan in accordance to their traditions in Quanzhou. The temple became an important meeting place for the clan and was also used for trade and educational purposes. The 1935 Shinchiku-Taichū earthquake severely damaged Zhenwu Temple and was repaired in 1953 and 1976 into its current form. On 28 March 2003, Zhenwu Temple was designated as a city-level monument.

== Architecture ==
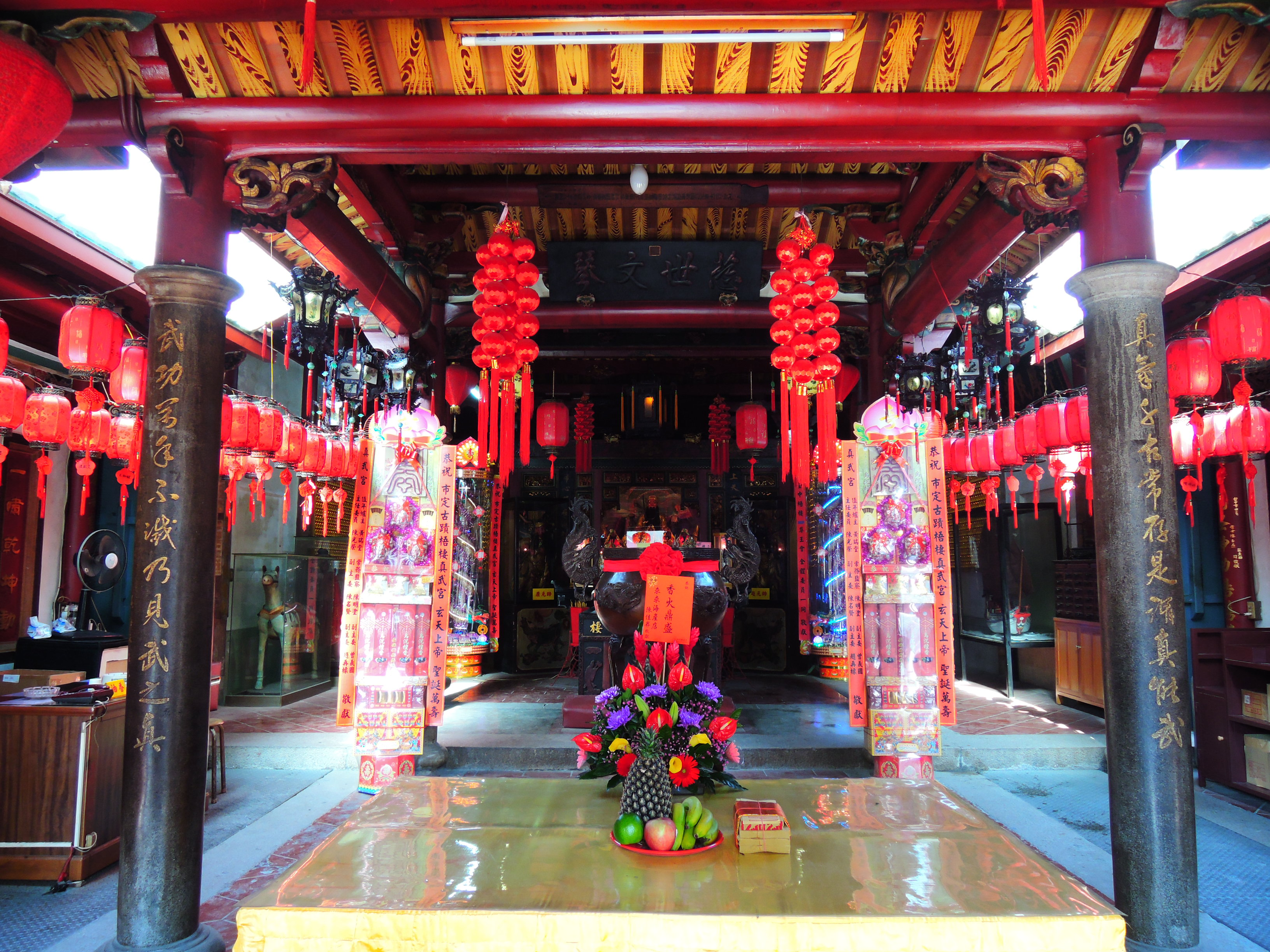
Temple interior

Zhenwu Temple is built in a traditional Hokkien architectural style with few alterations since its establishment. Wuqi was historically a port city, and before Zhenwu Temple was built, the land around it was used by trading companies as storage space for wood and stone imported from China. Zhenwu Temple heavily used these imported materials in its construction, including fir wood from Fuzhou and granite from Quanzhou, which are still standing today.

The interior of the temple contains sculptures of carp leaping into the air, while the swallowtail roof is decorated with dragon sculptures. In Chinese mythology, a carp turns into a dragon if it leaps across Longmen, a ravine on the Yellow River; the sculptures are a metaphor for Tsai clan descendants to mature and prosper. The temple also contains a plaque dating from 1864 that was gifted by Changhua county magistrate Wang Zhen (王楨) for the deity's assistance in quelling the Tai Chao-chuen incident.

== Worship ==
Every eighteen years, Zhenwu Temple holds an exceptionally festive Zhong Yuan Festival celebration known as the "Eighteenth-year Ghost Festival" (十八年普). The practice originated from when the Tsai clan was still in Mainland China, where the twenty-one neighborhoods in Liantang Village took turns hosting the event and cycling every eighteen years.
