= Niumatou Site =

Archaeological site in Qingshui, Taichung, Taiwan

- 牛罵頭遺址 (Chinese)
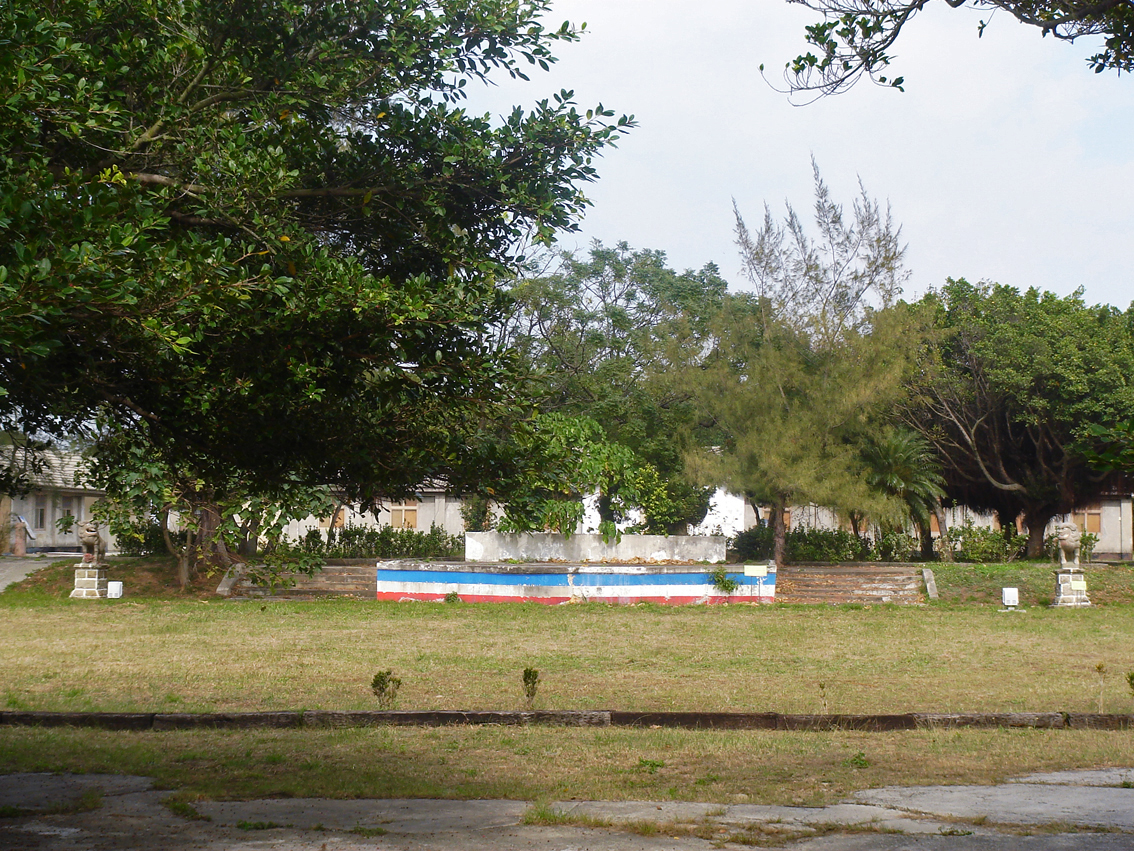

- Location within Taichung
- 24°16′05.7″N 120°34′49.8″E
- Type: archaeological site
- Location: Qingshui, Taichung, Taiwan

History
- Built: Neolithic

Site notes
- Public access: Qingshui Station

The Niumatou Site (traditional Chinese: 牛罵頭遺址; simplified Chinese: 牛骂头遗址; pinyin: Niúmàtóu Yízhǐ) is an archaeological site dating from the mid Neolithic period in Qingshui District, Taichung, Taiwan. It is the oldest archaeological site in central Taiwan. The site has been designated as a historical relic by then Taichung County Government.

== History ==
Civilizations in the area date to around 4,000 years ago when prehistoric people settled there during the Neolithic age. These cultures left behind stone tools and pottery. Because large numbers of stone hoes were unearthed, archaeologists think that those prehistoric people probably relied largely on farming for food. However, they also hunted and fished to add more variety to their diets. The site was originally discovered in 1943, but there were news of unearthed relics dating as far back as 1937. In the 1955, Mr. Liu Pin-Hsiung had conducted detailed research on site, discovering terracotta cultures featuring cord-marked decorations and black pottery cultures, now known as the Niumatou Culture and the Yingpu Culture.

== Transportation ==
The site is accessible within walking distance north east of Qingshui Station of Taiwan Railway.

== See also ==
- Prehistory of Taiwan
- Beinan Cultural Park
