= Shih Chun-jen =

Taiwanese neurosurgeon (1923–2017)

- 施純仁

Minister of the Department of Health of the Republic of China
- In office 14 January 1986 – 2 June 1990
- Preceded by: Hsu Tzu-chiu
- Succeeded by: Chang Po-ya

Personal details
- Born: 2 December 1923 Gosei, Taikō, Taichū Prefecture, Taiwan, Empire of Japan (today Wuqi, Taichung, Taiwan)
- Died: 18 June 2017 (aged 93) Beitou, Taipei, Taiwan
- Education: National Taiwan University (MD)

Shih Chun-jen (Chinese: 施純仁; pinyin: Shī Chúnrén; 2 December 1923 – 18 June 2017) was a Taiwanese neurosurgeon who led the Department of Health from 1986 to 1990.

== Life and career ==
Born in Taichung in 1923, he studied medicine at National Taiwan University. Upon earning his degree in 1947, Shih began working for the National Defense Medical Center. He completed his residency at Montreal Neurological Institute and Hospital in Canada from 1956 to 1958 and returned to Taiwan. That year, Shih began a cancer registry among three Taiwanese healthcare systems: National Taiwan University Hospital, Tri-Service General Hospital, and the Veterans' General Hospitals. A larger registry overseen by the Department of Health was started in 1979. Shih was appointed the head surgeon at Tri-Service General Hospital, a medical institution affiliated with the National Defense Medical Center, in 1975. Two years later, he co-founded the Taiwan Neurological Society. Shih left Tri-Service General Hospital and the National Defense Medical Center to lead the Department of Health and stepped down from the DOH in 1990.

He died of a heart attack in 2017 at Taipei Veterans General Hospital, aged 93.
