= Qingshui railway station =

Railway station in Qingshui, Taichung, Taiwan

Qingshui Station 清水車站
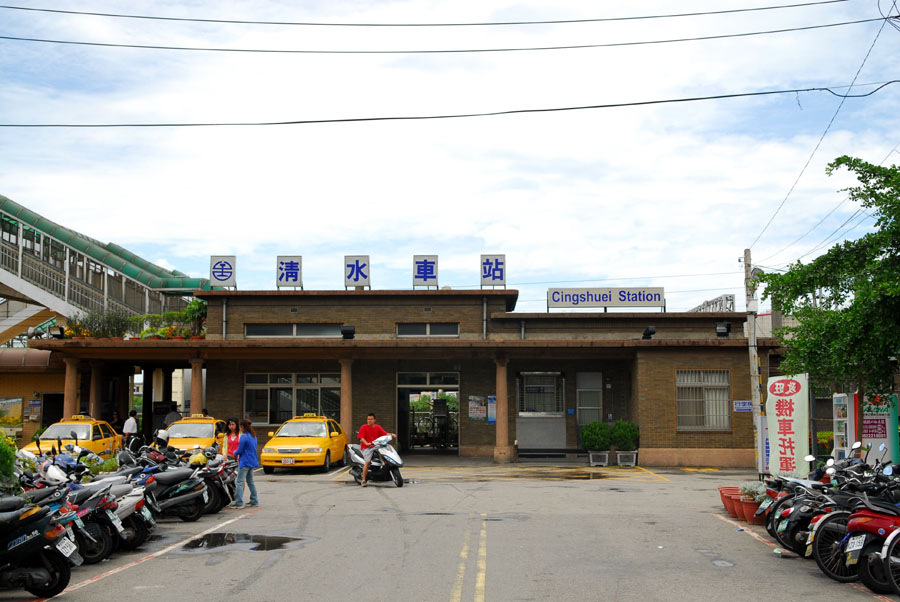

General information
- Location: Qingshui, Taichung, Taiwan
- Coordinates: 24°15′49.1″N 120°34′8.5″E
- System: Train station
- Owner: Taiwan Railway
- Operator: Taiwan Railway
- Line: Western Trunk line
- Train operators: Taiwan Railway

History
- Opened: 25 December 1920

Passengers
- 2,771 daily (2024)
Location

Qingshui (Chinese: 清水車站; Hanyu Pinyin: Qīngshuǐ chēzhàn; Tongyong Pinyin: Cingshuěi Chejhàn; Pe̍h-ōe-jī: Chheng-chúi Chhia-chām) is a railway station on Taiwan Railway West Coast line (Coastal line) located in Qingshui District, Taichung, Taiwan.

== History ==
The station, called Kiyomizu-eki (Japanese: 清水驛), was opened on 15 December 1920.

== Around the station ==
- National Qingshui Senior High School
- Niumatou Site
- Wuqi Fishing Port
- Taichung City Seaport Art Center

== See also ==
- List of railway stations in Taiwan

Preceding station	Taiwan Railway	Following station
Taichung Port towards Keelung	Western Trunk line	Shalu towards Pingtung
