= Wuqi District =

District in Taichung, Taiwan

Wuqi 梧棲區 Wuci
- District
- Wuqi District
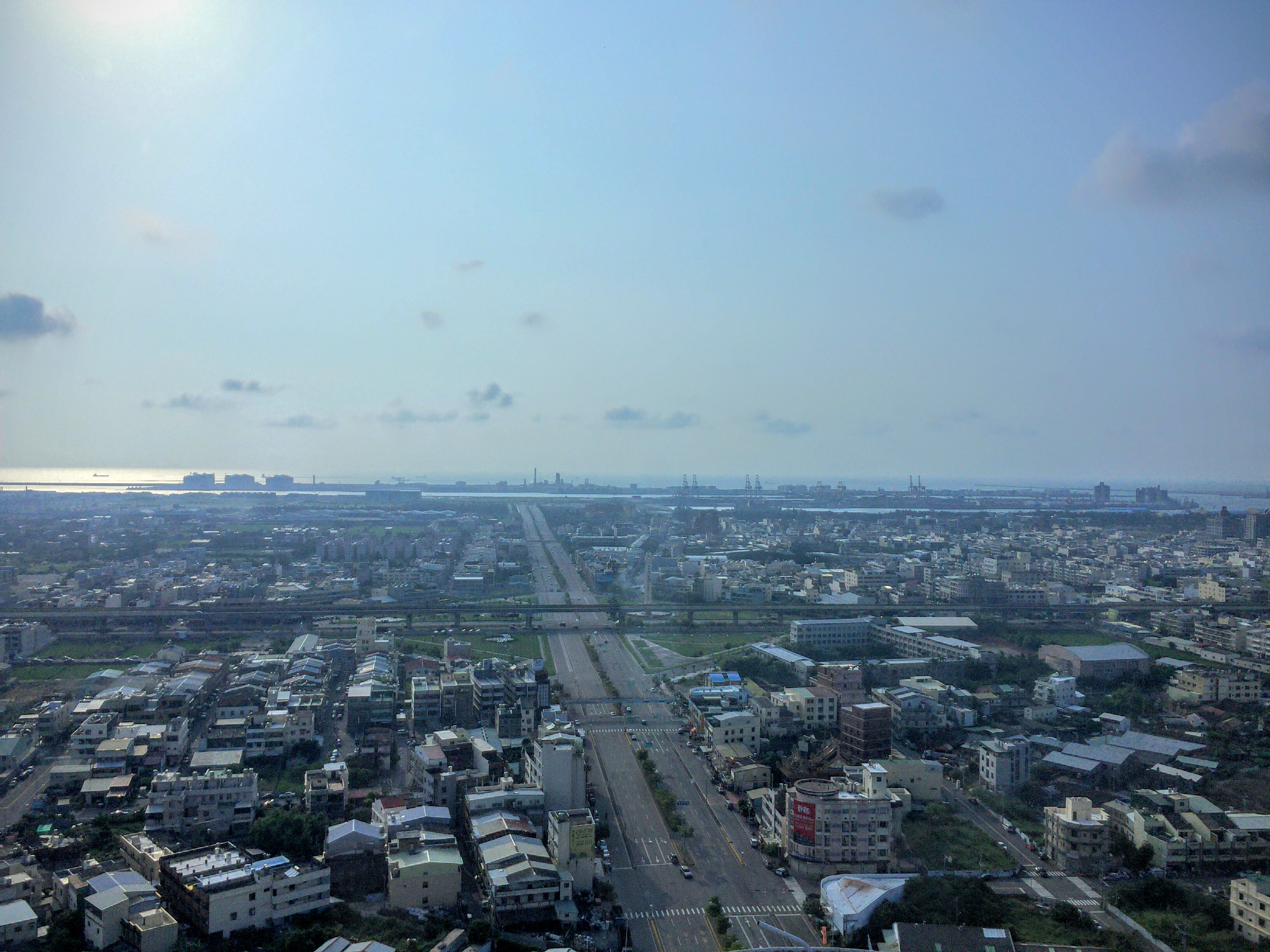
- Downtown Wuqi with the Port of Taichung in the background

- Wuqi District in Taichung City
- Coordinates: 24°15′27.3″N 120°31′43″E
- Country: Taiwan
- Special municipality: Taichung
- Established (District): 2010

Area
  - Total: 16.6049 km^{2} (6.4112 sq mi)

Population (February 2023)
  - Total: 59,979
  - Density: 3,612.1/km^{2} (9,355.4/sq mi)
- Time zone: UTC+8 (CST)
- Website: www.wuqi.taichung.gov.tw (in Chinese)

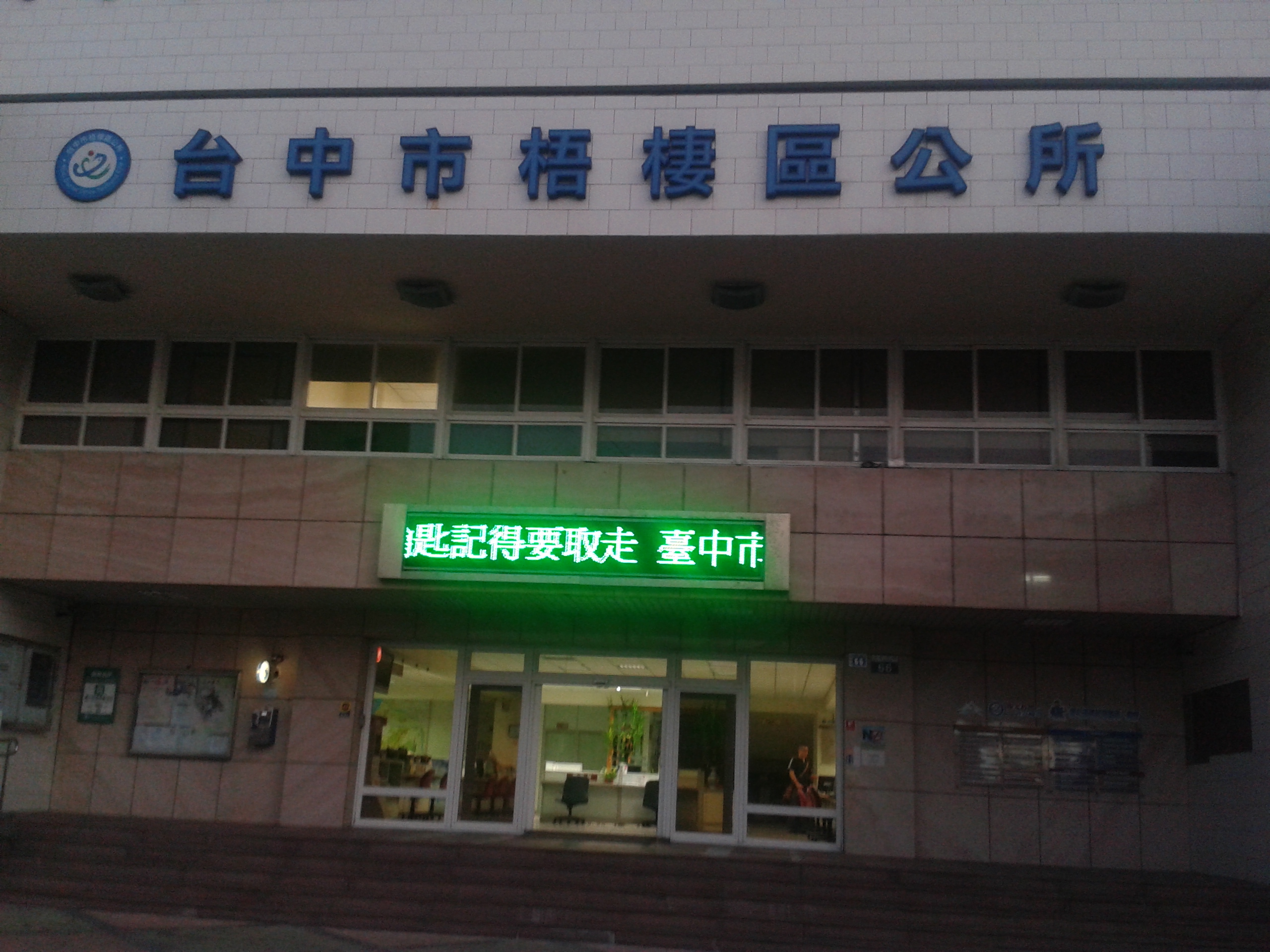
Wuqi District office

Wuqi District (Chinese: 梧棲區; pinyin: Wúqī Qū; Pe̍h-ōe-jī: Gô͘-chhe-khu) is a coastal suburban district in southern Taichung, Taiwan. The Port of Taichung is in Wuqi District.

== History ==
After the handover of Taiwan from Japan to the Republic of China in 1945, Wuqi was organized as an urban township of Taichung County. On 25 December 2010, Taichung County was merged with Taichung City and Wuqi was upgraded to a district of the city.

== Administrative divisions ==
Dingliao, Xialiao, Zhongzheng, Zhonghe, Wenhua, Anren, Caonan, Nanjian, Fude, Dazhuang, Dacun, Xingnong, Yongning and Yongan Village.

== Climate ==
Climate data for Wuqi District (1991–2020 normals, extremes 1976–present）
Month	Jan	Feb	Mar	Apr	May	Jun	Jul	Aug	Sep	Oct	Nov	Dec	Year
Record high °C (°F)	29.4 (84.9)	30.2 (86.4)	31.7 (89.1)	33.7 (92.7)	34.3 (93.7)	35.2 (95.4)	36.9 (98.4)	36.5 (97.7)	35.3 (95.5)	33.9 (93.0)	31.8 (89.2)	29.3 (84.7)	36.9 (98.4)
Mean daily maximum °C (°F)	19.2 (66.6)	19.6 (67.3)	22.3 (72.1)	26.0 (78.8)	28.9 (84.0)	31.1 (88.0)	32.2 (90.0)	31.9 (89.4)	30.8 (87.4)	28.0 (82.4)	25.1 (77.2)	21.2 (70.2)	26.4 (79.5)
Daily mean °C (°F)	16.1 (61.0)	16.4 (61.5)	18.9 (66.0)	22.7 (72.9)	25.8 (78.4)	28.1 (82.6)	29.2 (84.6)	28.9 (84.0)	27.6 (81.7)	24.7 (76.5)	21.8 (71.2)	18.1 (64.6)	23.2 (73.8)
Mean daily minimum °C (°F)	13.7 (56.7)	14.0 (57.2)	16.1 (61.0)	19.9 (67.8)	23.2 (73.8)	25.6 (78.1)	26.7 (80.1)	26.4 (79.5)	25.1 (77.2)	22.2 (72.0)	19.3 (66.7)	15.6 (60.1)	20.7 (69.2)
Record low °C (°F)	2.4 (36.3)	5.2 (41.4)	4.9 (40.8)	9.4 (48.9)	14.8 (58.6)	16.7 (62.1)	20.6 (69.1)	22.3 (72.1)	16.2 (61.2)	13.0 (55.4)	9.5 (49.1)	5.6 (42.1)	2.4 (36.3)
Average precipitation mm (inches)	32.0 (1.26)	60.4 (2.38)	81.5 (3.21)	106.7 (4.20)	202.2 (7.96)	208.1 (8.19)	183.5 (7.22)	242.3 (9.54)	91.0 (3.58)	20.3 (0.80)	23.1 (0.91)	33.1 (1.30)	1,284.2 (50.55)
Average precipitation days (≥ 0.1 mm)	5.4	7.0	9.3	9.4	10.2	10.9	9.0	10.9	6.0	2.4	3.3	4.6	88.4
Average relative humidity (%)	78.4	79.9	77.9	77.6	78.5	78.2	76.2	77.4	75.9	73.8	76.1	76.0	77.2
Mean monthly sunshine hours	148.2	122.4	143.5	146.8	175.1	191.9	242.5	213.1	208.1	222.6	168.5	160.8	2,143.5
Source: Central Weather Bureau

== Economy ==
- Fishing
- Tourism on the coast

== Tourist attractions ==
- Haotian Temple
- Mitsui Outlet Park Taichung
- Zhenwu Temple

== Transportation ==
- Port of Taichung

== Infrastructure ==
- Taichung LNG Terminal

== Notable natives ==
- Shih Chun-jen, Minister of Department of Health (1986–1990)
