= Gaomei Wetlands =

Wetland in Qingshui, Taichung, Taiwan

- 高美溼地 (Chinese)
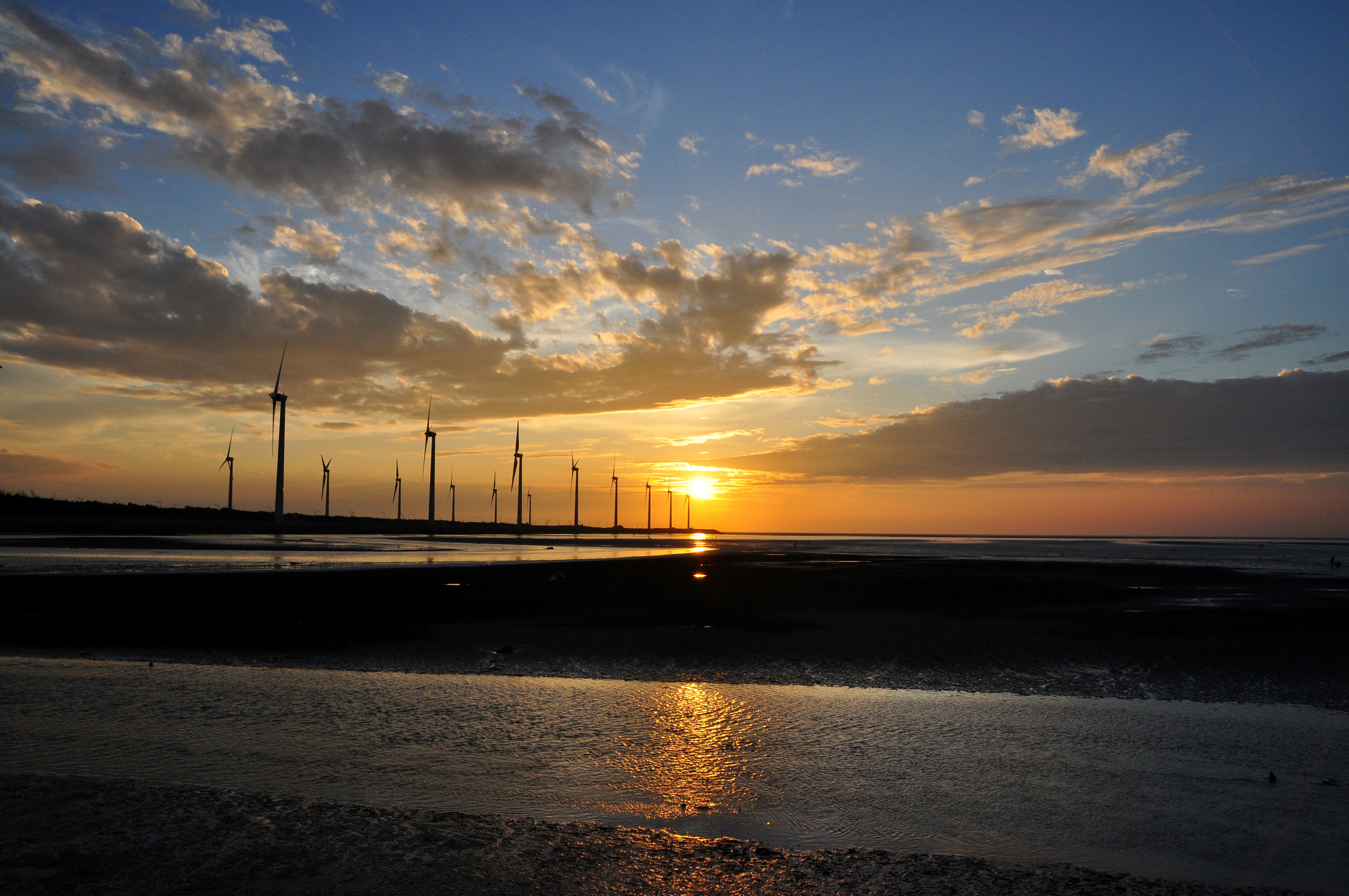

- Location within Taichung
- Location: Qingshui, Taichung, Taiwan
- Coordinates: 24.312059°N 120.549704°E
- Type: wetland
- Built: 29 September 2004
- Website: Official website (in Chinese)

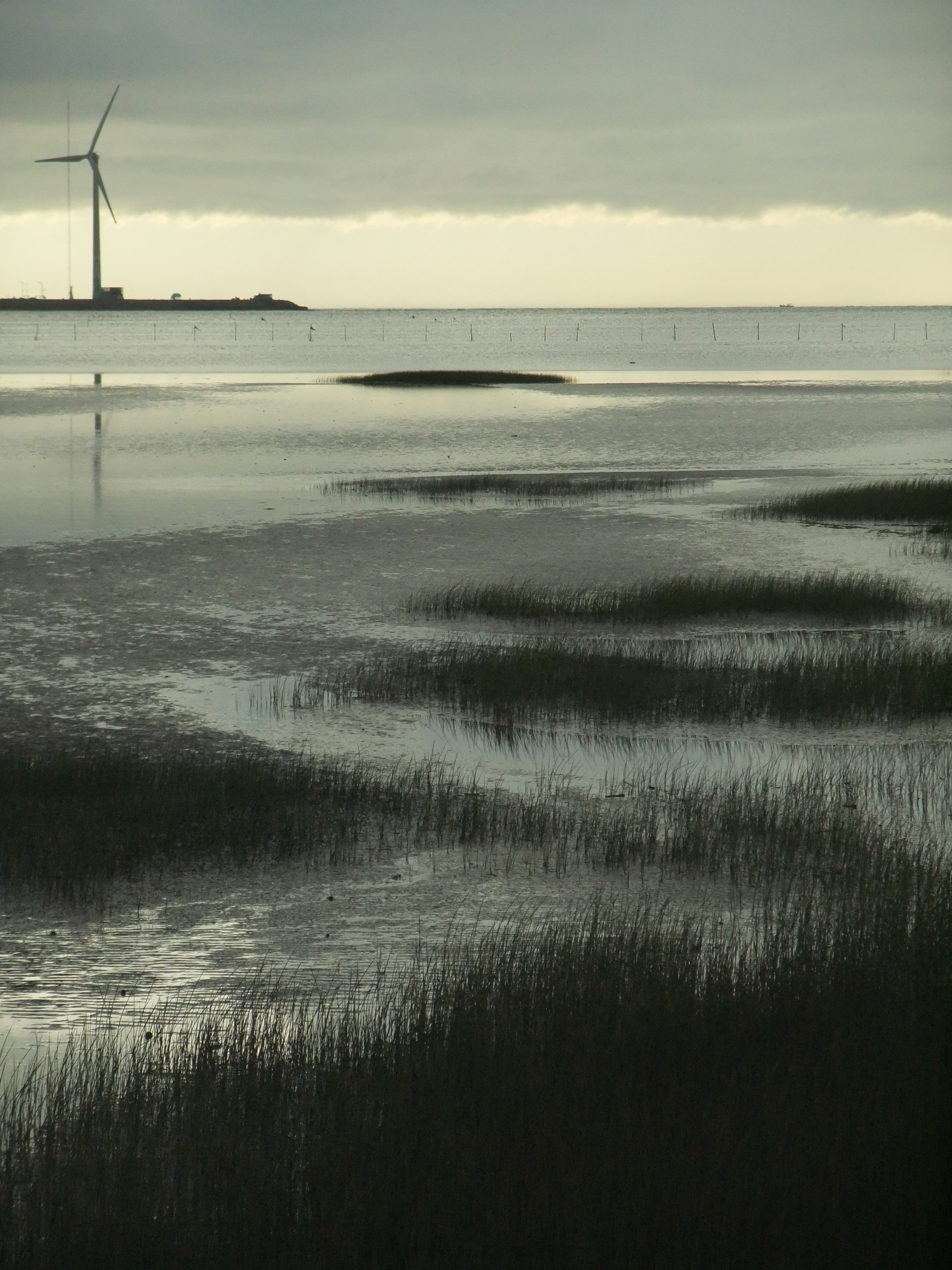
Gaomei wetland (before a thunderstorm)

Gaomei Wetlands, also known as the Kaomei Wetlands, (traditional Chinese: 高美溼地; simplified Chinese: 高美湿地; pinyin: Gāoměi Shīdì), officially Gaomei Wetland Preservation Area (Chinese: 高美溼地野生動物保護區), is a wetland in Qingshui District, Taichung, Taiwan.

== History ==
Gaomei Wetlands was established on 29 September 2005. In August 2015, Typhoon Soudelor destroyed 6 out of 18 wind turbines of the Taiwan Power Company in the area. In October 2019, a bridge connecting the Taichung mainland with the wetlands area failed a safety inspection, following the Nanfang'ao Bridge collapse 3 weeks earlier in Su'ao Township, Yilan County. The Binhai Bridge (Chinese: 濱海橋) was examined by Taiwan International Ports Corporation. It spans over a length of 70 meters and was 45 years old by the time of inspection.

== Geography ==
Gaomei Wetlands is a flat land which spans over 300 hectares, but it is only about 10% of Dadu River wetlands.

== Transportation ==
Gaomei Wetlands is accessible by bus from Qingshui Station of Taiwan Railway.

== See also ==
- List of tourist attractions in Taiwan
- Sicao Wetlands
