= Mitsui Shopping Park LaLaport Taichung =

Shopping mall in East, Taichung, Taiwan

- 三井LaLaport台中

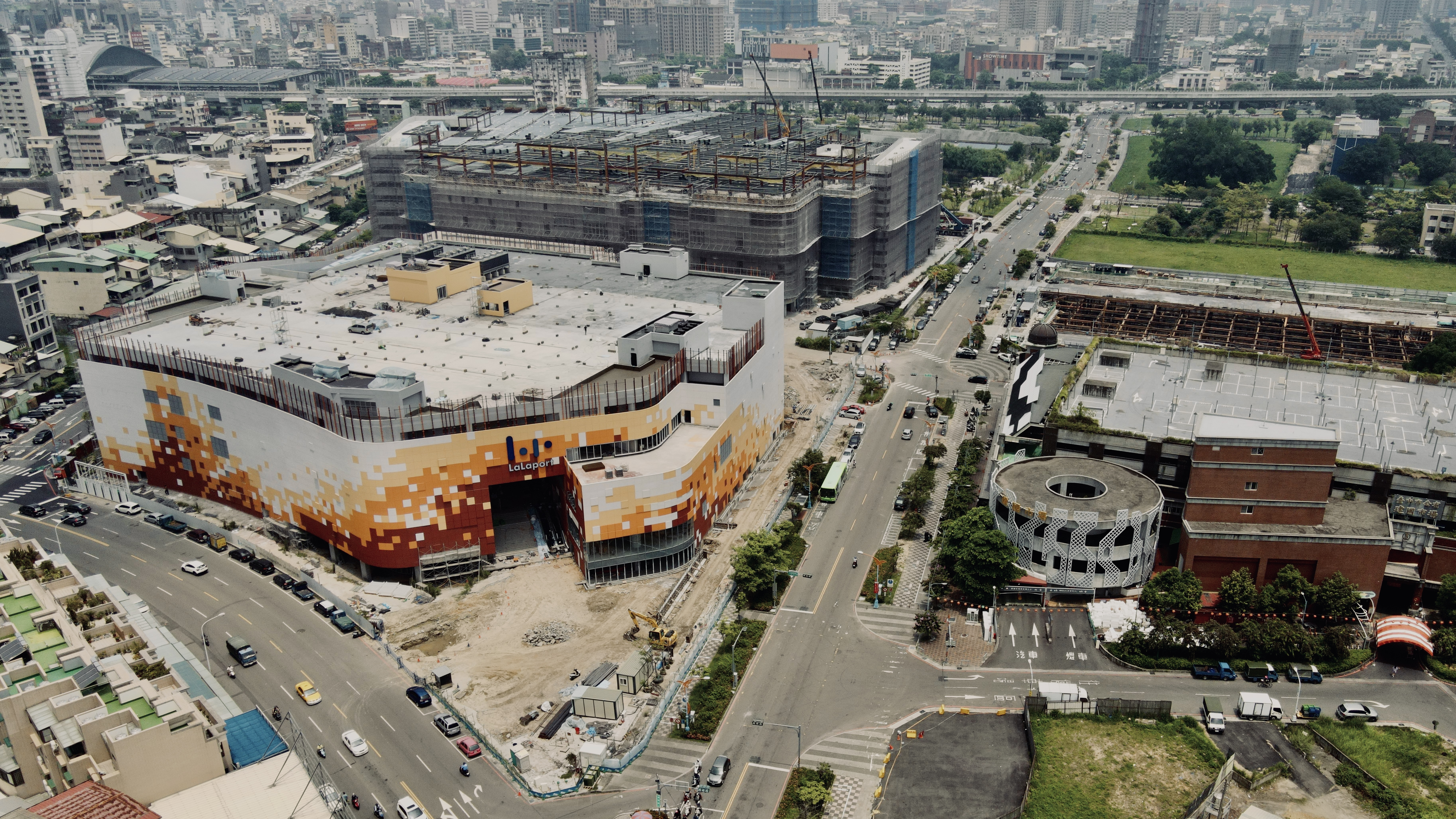
- Location: East District, Taichung, Taiwan
- Coordinates: 24.135003°N 120.692271°E
- Address: 600, 700 Jinde Road, East District, Taichung, Taiwan
- Opened: 16 May 2023; 3 years ago
- Developer: San Zhong Gang Outlet Co., Ltd.
- Manager: Mitsui & Co. Taiwan Ltd.
- Owner: Mitsui & Co. Taiwan Ltd.
- Num. of stores: 300
- Floor area: 2,131,000 sq ft (198,000 m^{2})
- Floors: 6
- Public transit: Taichung railway station
- Website: Official website

Mitsui Shopping Park LaLaport Taichung is a shopping mall in East District, Taichung, Taiwan. It is the first LaLaport shopping mall to be developed in the country and the fifth retail property of Mitsui Fudosan. Development on the facility started in 2019 and its construction began in June 2020.

== Location ==
Mitsui Shopping Park LaLaport Taichung is located within a six-minute walk from Taichung railway station.

== Facilities ==
The shopping centre includes two buildings built on two sites, which are connected by a bridge. The total area covered by the shopping centre is 463,000 ft^{2} (43,000 m^{2}) while the total floor space is more than 2,131,000 ft^{2} (198,000 m^{2}), including a multi-floor parking space area.

The South Building includes the largest collection of Japanese specialty stores in Taiwan. It covers an area of approximately 230,000 ft^{2} (21,000 m^{2}) across four floors above ground and one underground floor.

The North Building covers approximately 506,000 ft^{2} (47,000 m^{2}), with seven floors above ground and one underground floor. It has a collection of small and medium-sized stores, with an easy shopping zone, that enables families to stroll and shop. The North Building is also home to nearly 260 stores while the remaining 40 stores is located in the South Building.

== Incidents ==
At 1:43 p.m. on the afternoon of 17 May 2023, one day after the mall had opened, a man fell over the railing on the atrium platform on the fourth floor onto the stage area of the first floor of the North Building. Witnesses reported a loud noise when the man fell and heard people screaming in response. Many people soon rushed forward to try and help the gravely injured man. He was rushed by ambulance to China Medical University, but doctors were unable to resuscitate him and he was declared dead.

== See also ==
- List of tourist attractions in Taiwan
- LaLaport Nangang
- Mitsui Outlet Park Taichung Port
