= Port of Taichung =

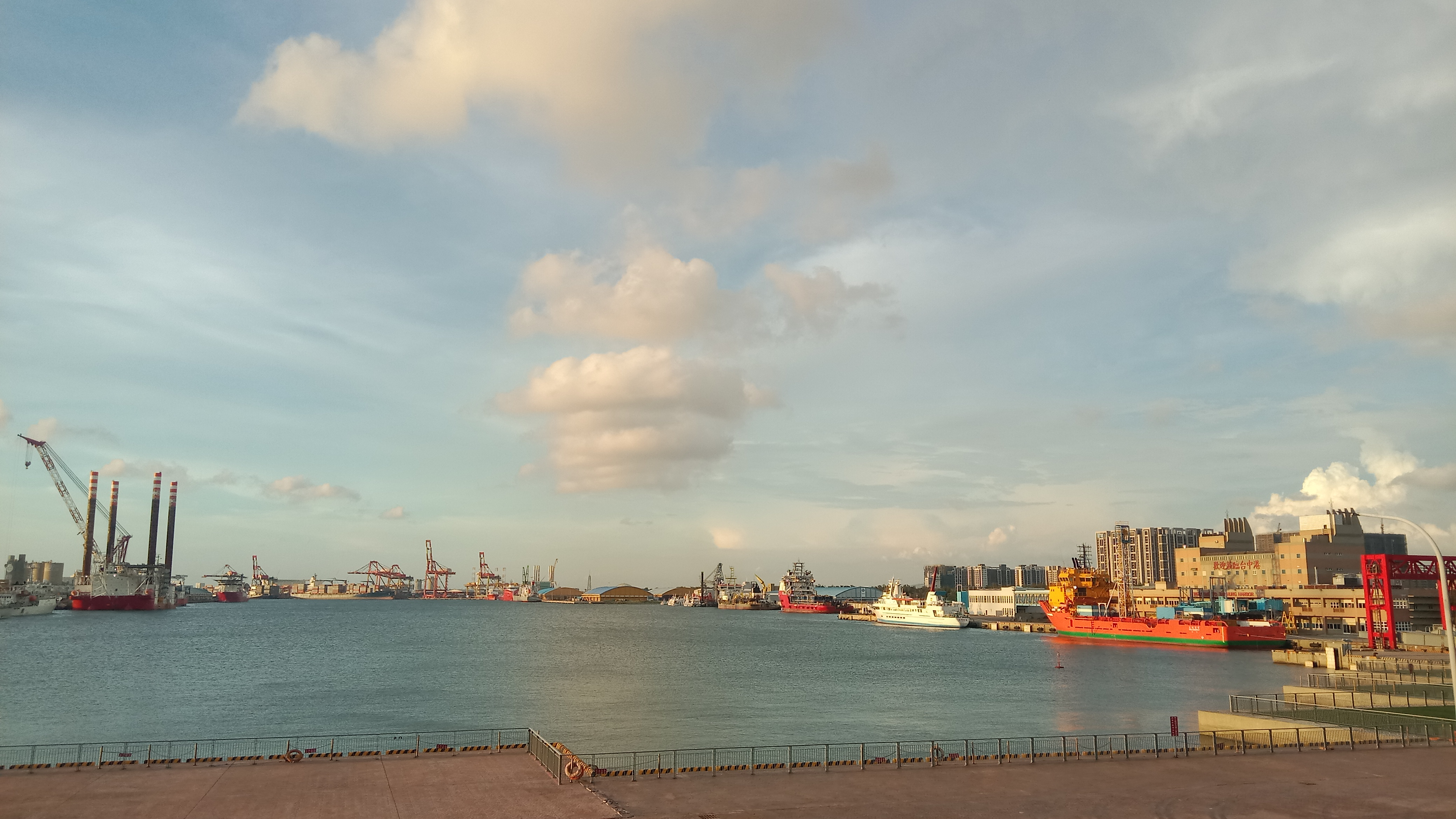
- Interactive map of Port of Taichung
- Location within Taiwan
- Native name: 臺中港

Location
- Location: Wuqi, Taichung, Taiwan
- Coordinates: 24.294528°N 120.490917°E
- UN/LOCODE: TWTXG

Details
- Opened: 1976
- Type of Harbor: Port
- Size: 40.00 km^{2}
- President: Chung Ying-feng

Statistics
- Website tc.twport.com.tw

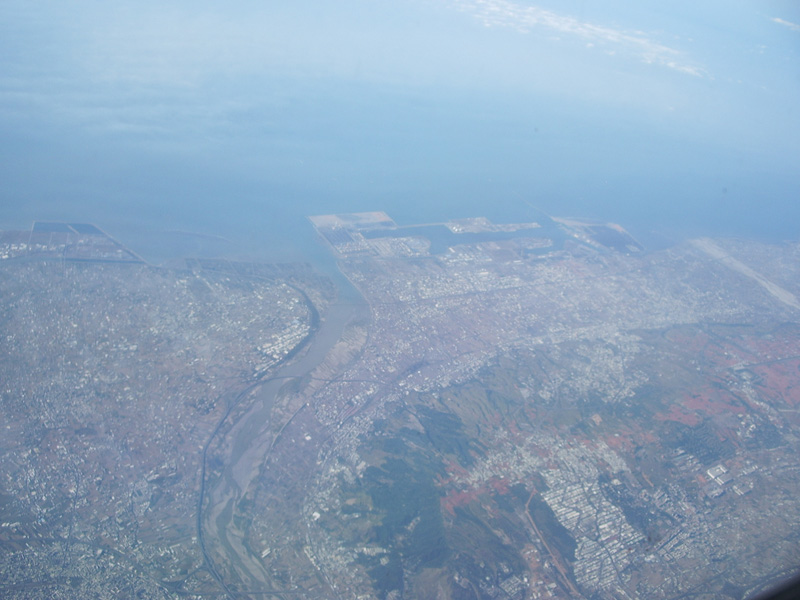
Aerial view of the Port of Taichung

The Port of Taichung (Chinese: 臺中港), also Taichung Port, is a port located in Wuqi District, Taichung, Taiwan. It is the second-largest port in Taiwan after Kaohsiung Port and operated by Taiwan International Ports Corporation, Taiwan's state-owned harbor management company.

== Overview ==
The port covers an area of 3,793 ha (9,370 acres), and includes industrial, fishing, and business ports. It is 12.5 km (7.8 mi)-long and 2.5 to 4.5 km wide. It can accommodate vessels of up to 60,000 tons, and in June 2000 earned an ISO-9001 rating. The port still has hundreds of hectares left of undeveloped space.

The harbor is located 110 nautical miles from Keelung Port and 120 nautical miles from Kaohsiung Port. In 2010, the harbor surpassed Keelung Port to become the second-largest port in Taiwan. Total investment has topped NT$457.5 billion (US$15.3 billion) by 59 companies, while thirty firms have established operations within its free-trade zone. Compared to 2010, total cargo processed has grown 21% while containers handled grew 13.92%. The port has seen growing luxury car shipments in 2010, indicating signs of economic recovery for the island.

The future development plan of Taichung Port includes a commercial port expansion plan and an industrial port development plan, which will be gradually implemented in line with the development of international shipping. The goal is that Taichung Port will become an international port with 78 terminals.

== History ==
In August 1968, preliminary research into a new port started. By July 1969, it was decided to make Taichung Port into a new international port, with construction starting on 1 February 1971. The port first opened on 31 October 1976. The port was part of the Ten Major Construction Projects proposed by Premier Chiang Ching-kuo.

== Port configuration/facilities ==
Taichung Port currently has 58 terminals with automated unloading and storage equipments. It includes the following:

Coastal Recreation Zone, Fishery Zone: Wuqi Fishing Port and the Taichung Aquarium (臺中海洋館).

Food Processing Zone

Port Service Zone (I): Port services, quarantine and other related and auxiliary facilities.

Port Service Zone (II): Port office, Taichung Port Passenger Terminal.

Logistic & Warehousing Area: Taichung Port Technology Industrial Park of the Ministry of Economic Affairs.

Power Plant Zone (I): Taichung Power Plant and related auxiliary facilities.

Power Plant Zone (II): low-polluting power plants or wind power generators.

Petrochemical Industrial Zone (I~IV)

Industrial Zone

Free Trade Zone: The Port's volume of goods in the Free Trade Zone in 2013 was 12,637,515 metric tons, ranking first in Taiwan

== Surrounding sites ==
Mitsui Outlet Park Taichung

== Transportation ==
The port can be reached by bus, rail, or road.

=== Rail ===
- TR Taichung Harbor Line

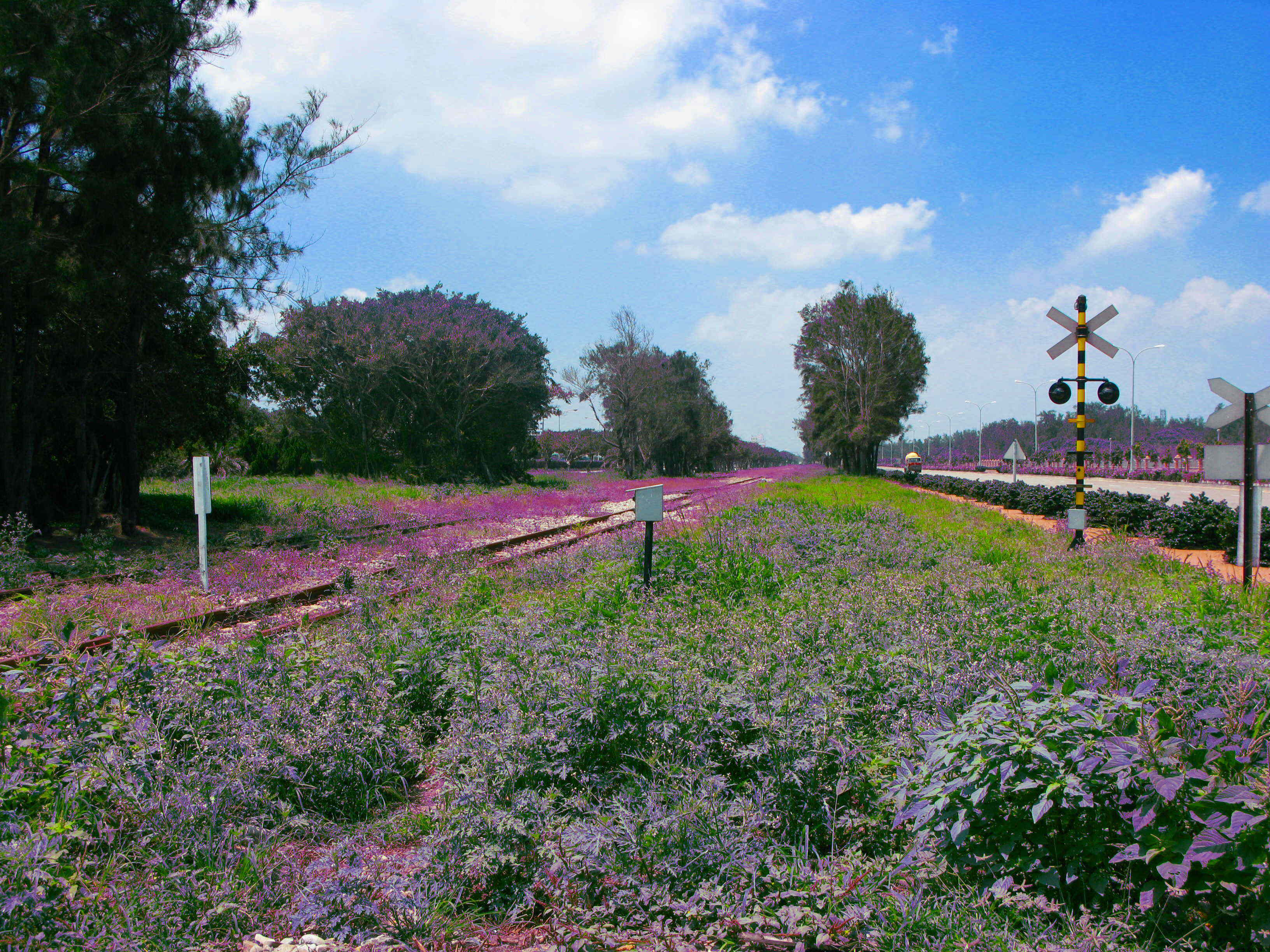
TRA Cargo Branch Line - Taichung Harbor Line

=== Road ===
- Provincial Highway No. 12
- Provincial Highway No. 17
- Provincial Highway No. 61

== See also ==
- Taichung Airport
- Port of Keelung
- Port of Kaohsiung
- Transportation in Taiwan
