= Mitsui Outlet Park Taichung Port =

Outlet store in Wuqi, Taichung, Taiwan

- Mitsui Outlet Park 台中港

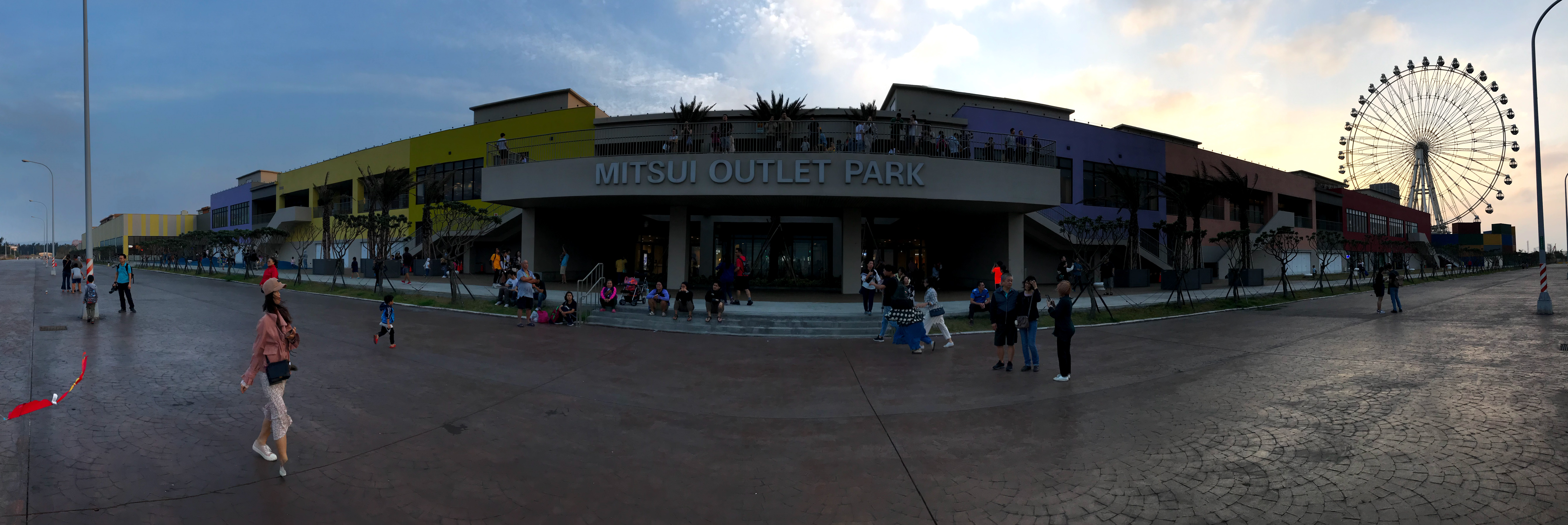
- Location: Wuqi, Taichung, Taiwan
- Coordinates: 24°15′27.9″N 120°31′06.7″E
- Opened: 12 December 2018
- Developer: San Zhong Gang Outlet Co., Ltd.
- Manager: Mitsui & Co. Taiwan Ltd.
- Owner: Mitsui & Co. Taiwan Ltd.
- Architect: outlet store
- Num. of stores: 170
- Floor area: 6 hectares
- Floors: 2
- Public transit: Shalu Station
- Website: Official website

The Mitsui Outlet Park Taichung Port (Chinese: Mitsui Outlet Park 台中港; pinyin: Mitsui Outlet Park Táizhōng Gǎng) is an outlet store in Wuqi District, Taichung, Taiwan.

== History ==
The idea to construct the outlet was brought up in September 2016. On 21 August 2017, the groundbreaking ceremony was held which was attended by Taichung Mayor Lin Chia-lung and Chairperson of Taiwan International Ports Corporation. The outlet was opened on 12 December 2018 after 16 months of construction.

The second phase of the expansion project was opened on 16 December 2021. A total of 51 stores have been added.

== Architecture ==
The outlet was designed by TMA Architects and Associates and constructed by Reiju Construction Co., Ltd. It was designed with a total of two stories and spans over a total floor area of 6 hectares on an 18-hectare site area It features a giant ferris wheel.

== Business ==
The outlet is owned and operated by Mitsui & Co. Taiwan Ltd. It has a mix of 170 shops and restaurants.

On 7 June 2019, Taiwan's first 20 degrees Celsius ski resort "SNOWTOWN" was opened with the introduction of Japanese technology.

== See also ==
- List of tourist attractions in Taiwan
- Mitsui Outlet Park Linkou
- Mitsui Shopping Park LaLaport Taichung
