= List of county and city highways in Taiwan =

Number	Northern/Western Terminus	Southern/Eastern Terminus	Length (km)	Length (mi)	Alternative Name
Cty 101	Prov 2 in Sanzhi, New Taipei City	Prov 2B in Tamsui, New Taipei City	17.637	10.959	
Cty 101A	Cty 101 in Sanzhi, New Taipei City	Prov 2A in Beitou, Taipei	10.750	6.680	Balaka Highway
Cty 102	Prov 2 in Zhongzheng District, Keelung	Prov 2C in Shuangxi and Gongliao, New Taipei City	39.673	24.652	
Cty 102A	Cty 102 in Shuangxi, New Taipei City	Prov 2 in Gongliao, New Taipei City	9.140	5.679	Shuangao Highway
Cty 103	Prov 15 in Wugu, New Taipei City	Prov 1A in Sanchong, New Taipei City	9.563	5.942	
Cty 103A	Cty 103 in Luzhou, New Taipei City	Chongyang Bridge in Sanchong, New Taipei City	3.923	2.438	Chongyang Bridge Spur
Cty 104	Nat 1 in Sanchong, New Taipei City	Prov 3 in Wanhua, Taipei	4.465	2.774	
Cty 105	Prov 15 in Bali, New Taipei City	Prov 1 in Guishan, Taoyuan	22.478	13.967	
Cty 106	Prov 15 / Prov 61 in Linkou, New Taipei City	Prov 2D in Ruifang, New Taipei City	82.249	51.107	
Cty 106A	Prov 1 / Cty 106 in Xinzhuang, New Taipei City	Cty 106 in Banqiao, New Taipei City	6.805	4.228	Feeder Road for New Taipei City Special Highway 1
Cty 106B	Nat 3A in Wenshan, Taipei	Prov 9 in Pinglin, New Taipei City	22.721	14.118	Wenshan Road
Cty 107	Cty 103 in Wugu, New Taipei City	Cty 114 in Shulin, New Taipei City	16.486	10.244	
Cty 107A	Cty 107 in Wugu, New Taipei City	Prov 1 in Xinzhuang, New Taipei City	4.021	2.499	Wugu Interchange Spur
Cty 108	Prov 15 in Luzhu, Taoyuan	Zhongxing Bridge in Sanchong, New Taipei City	35.076	21.795	
Cty 109	Prov 5 in Nangang, Taipei	Cty 106 in Shenkeng, New Taipei City	2.690	1.671	Nanshan Highway
Cty 110	Prov 15 in Dayuan, Taoyuan	Prov 9 in Xindian, New Taipei City	46.916	29.152	
Cty 110A	Cty 110 in Dayuan, Taoyuan	Prov 1 in Pingzhen, Taoyuan	12.615	7.839	
Cty 110B	Cty 110 in Yingge, New Taipei City	Bade, Taoyuan	1.461	0.908	Danan Interchange Spur
Cty 111	Prov 3 in Zhongzheng, Taipei	Cty 110 in Xindian, New Taipei City	7.024	4.365	
Cty 112	Prov 15 in Guanyin, Taoyuan	Prov 3 in Daxi, Taoyuan	29.456	18.303	
Cty 112A	Cty 112 in Daxi, Taoyuan	Prov 3 in Daxi, Taoyuan	2.141	1.330	Daxi Interchange Spur
Cty 113	Prov 15 in Dayuan, Taoyuan	Prov 3B in Longtan, Taoyuan	31.215	19.396	Zhongfeng Road (Zhongli to Longtan)
Cty 113A	Zhongli, Taoyuan	Longtan, Taoyuan	10.059	6.250	Jinling Road
Cty 113B	Prov 3 in Longtan, Taoyuan	Cty 113 in Longtan, Taoyuan	1.703	1.058	Longtan Interchange Spur
Cty 113C	Taoyuan HSR station	Prov 1 in Zhongli, Taoyuan	6.003	3.730	
Cty 114	Prov 61 in Xinwu, Taoyuan	Guangfu Bridge in Banqiao, New Taipei City	56.914	35.365	
Cty 115	Cty 112 in Guanyin, Taoyuan	Cty 120 / Prov 68 in Qionglin	37.535	23.323	
Cty 116	Prov 1 / Prov 1A in Guishan, Taoyuan	Prov 3 in Banqiao, New Taipei City	5.368	3.336	
Cty 117	Prov 15 in Xinfeng, Hsinchu	Prov 1 in Hsinchu	42.363	26.323	
Cty 118	Cty 122 in Zhubei	Prov 7 in Fuxing, Taoyuan	59.984	37.272	Luoma Highway (From Fuxing to Guanxi)
Cty 119	Prov 6 in Houlong	Cty 130 in Sanyi, Miaoli	30.827	19.155	
Cty 119A	Gongguan, Miaoli	Cty 119 in Tongluo	9.279	5.766	Foothill Road (沿山道)
Cty 120	Prov 1 in Zhubei, Hsinchu	Jianshi, Hsinchu	41.381	25.713	
Cty 121	Cty 128 in Tongxiao	Prov 1 in Dajia, Taichung	22.741	14.131	
Cty 122	Nanliao Fishery Harbor in Hsinchu City	Wufeng, Hsinchu	51.605	32.066	Nanqing Highway
Cty 123	Cty 120 in Qionglin	Cty 122 in Zhudong	7.520	4.673	
Cty 124	Prov 61 in Zhunan, Miaoli	Prov 3 in Shitan, Miaoli	51.174	31.798	
Cty 124A	Prov 1 in Toufen, Miaoli	Cty 124 in Toufen, Miaoli	1.626	1.010	Toufen Interchange Spur
Cty 124B	Prov 3 in Sanwan, Miaoli	Cty 124 in Nanzhuang, Miaoli	7.896	4.906	
Cty 125	Prov 1B in Daya, Taichung	Prov 1B in Wuri, Taichung	14.532	9.030	
Cty 126	Houlong	Prov 3 in Shitan, Miaoli	29.904	18.581	
Cty 127	Prov 1B in Daya, Taichung	Prov 3 in Wufeng, Taichung	25.012	15.542	
Cty 128	Tongxiao railway station	Cty 119A in Gongguan, Miaoli	21.050	13.080	
Cty 129	Prov 3 in Shigang, Taichung	Prov 3 in Dali, Taichung	34.556	21.472	
Cty 130	Yuanli railway station	Prov 3 in Dahu, Miaoli	31.126	19.341	
Cty 131	Prov 21 / Prov 14 in Puli, Nantou	Cty 151 in Lugu, Nantou	49.501	30.758	
Cty 132	Da'an, Taichung	Houli railway station	19.983	12.417	
Cty 132A	Cty 132 in Houli, Taichung	Cty 132 in Houli, Taichung	3.286	2.042	
Cty 133	Prov 21 in Guoxing	Prov 14 in Guoxing	6.168	3.833	
Cty 134	Prov 17 / Cty 139 in Shengang, Changhua	Prov 19 in Changhua	12.636	7.852	
Cty 134A	Cty 134 / Cty 134B in Hemei	Prov 19 in Changhua	4.404	2.737	
Cty 134B	Nat 3 in Hemei	Cty 134 / Cty 134B in Hemei	3.791	2.356	
Cty 135	Cty 138 in Hemei	Cty 148 in Xihu, Changhua	21.823	13.560	Formerly Cty 134A and Cty 134B; originally ran from Meichang to Xihu, this became Cty 138A and Cty 146 in 2017
Cty 135A	Cty 135 in Puyan, Changhua	Prov 19 in Xihu, Changhua	14.956	9.293	
Cty 136	Prov 17 in Wuqi, Taichung	Prov 14 in Guoxing	50.02	31.08	Zhongpu Highway
Cty 137	Prov 1 in Changhua	Cty 152 in Ershui	34.111	21.196	
Cty 138	Zhangbin Industrial Park in Xianxi, Changhua	Cty 134 in Changhua	13.396	8.324	
Cty 138A	Cty 138 in Xianxi, Changhua	Cty 134 in Hemei	4.634	2.879	Was a portion of Cty 135 before 2017
Cty 139	Prov 17 / Cty 134 in Shengang, Changhua	Cty 131 in Lugu, Nantou	66.403	41.261	
Cty 139A	Cty 139 in Hemei	Prov 19 in Changhua	15.534	9.652	
Cty 139B	Cty 139 in Nantou City, Nantou	Prov 3 in Mingjian	16.505	10.256	
Cty 140	Prov 61 in Yuanli, Miaoli	Zhuolan	34.748	21.591	Southern Cross-Miaoli Highway (苗栗南橫公路)
Cty 141	Prov 1 in Yuanlin	Prov 3 in Linnei	24.563	15.263	
Cty 142	Cty 135 in Lukang	Prov 19 in Changhua	9.948	6.181	Zhanglu Road
Cty 143	Prov 17 in Fangyuan	Dacheng, Changhua	23.590	14.658	
Cty 144	Prov 61 in Fuxing, Changhua	Cty 137 / Prov 76 in Yuanlin, Changhua	27.100	16.839	Yuanlin Drainage Surface Road (員林大排平面道路), Service Road for Expressway 76
Cty 144A	Cty 144 in Fuxing, Changhua	Cty 137 in Huatan	11.964	7.434	Fanhua Road
Cty 145	Pitou, Changhua	Prov 19 in Beigang, Yunlin	43.941	27.304	
Cty 145A	Tuku, Yunlin	Cty 157 in Xingang, Chiayi	12.955	8.050	
Cty 145B	Yunlin HSR station	Prov 1D in Cihtong	?	?	
Cty 146	Cty 135 / Prov 19 in Xihu, Changhua	Cty 137 in Dacun	12.593	7.825	
Cty 147	Prov 14 in Guoxing, Nantou	Cty 131 in Shuili	14.288	8.878	
Cty 148	Fangyuan, Changhua	Prov 3 in Caotun	39.433	24.503	
Cty 149	Prov 3 in Zhushan, Nantou	Prov 3 in Meishan, Chiayi	40.162	24.956	
Cty 149A	Prov 3 in Douliu	Cty 169 in Meishan, Chiayi	53.798	33.429	
Cty 149B	Cty 149 in Zhushan, Nantou	Cty 149A in Gukeng	8.869	5.511	
Cty 150	Fangyuan, Changhua	Prov 3 / Prov 14B in Nantou City, Nantou	43.726	27.170	
Cty 151	Prov 3 in Zhushan, Nantou	Lugu, Nantou	18.827	11.699	
Cty 151A	Prov 3 in Lugu, Nantou	Cty 151 in Lugu, Nantou	1.116	0.693	
Cty 152	Dacheng, Changhua	Prov 3C in Jiji, Nantou	55.711	34.617	
Cty 153	Prov 17 in Mailiao	Cty 155 in Beigang, Yunlin	17.267	10.729	
Cty 153A	Mailiao, Yunlin	Cty 153 in Mailiao	6.233	3.873	
Cty 154	6th Oil Refinery in Mailiao	Linnei	43	27	
Cty 154A	Cty 154 in Xiluo	Prov 19 in Lunbei	9.648	5.995	
Cty 154B	Cty 154 in Cihtong, Yunlin	Prov 3 in Gukeng, Yunlin	17.529	10.892	
Cty 155	Prov 61 in Taixi, Yunlin	Prov 19 in Beigang, Yunlin	21.168	13.153	
Cty 156	Prov 17 in Mailiao, Yunlin	Cty 154 in Cihtong, Yunlin	30.327	18.844	
Cty 156A	Erlun, Yunlin	Erlun, Yunlin	1.968	1.223	
Cty 156B	Erlun, Yunlin	Tuku, Yunlin	8.605	5.347	
Cty 157	Prov 1 in Dounan, Yunlin	Prov 17 in Budai, Chiayi	44.664	27.753	
Cty 158	Prov 17 in Taixi, Yunlin	Prov 1 in Dounan, Yunlin	32.956	20.478	
Cty 158A	Prov 17 in Taixi, Yunlin	Cty 149 in Zhushan, Nantou	52.964	32.910	
Cty 158B	Cty 158 in Dounan, Yunlin	Prov 3 in Gukeng, Nantou	11.508	7.151	
Cty 159	Prov 19 / Cty 164 in Lioujiao, Chiayi	Cty 159A in Fanlu	36.641	22.768	
Cty 159A	Cty 159 in Chiayi	Prov 18 / Cty 169 in Zhuqi	45.554	28.306	
Cty 160	Sihu, Yunlin	Cty 145 in Tuku, Yunlin	22.693	14.101	
Cty 161	Cty 161 in Puzi	Prov 17 in Budai, Chiayi	16.777	10.425	
Cty 162	Cty 157 in Xikou, Chiayi	Prov 3 in Meishan, Chiayi	16.161	10.042	
Cty 162A	Prov 3 in Meishan, Chiayi	Cty 169 in Meishan, Chiayi	46.617	28.966	
Cty 162B	Dalin, Chiayi	Minxiong, Chiayi	8.968	5.572	
Cty 163	Cty 159 in Chiayi City	Budai, Chiayi	45.992	28.578	
Cty 164	Prov 17 / Prov 61 in Kouhu	Prov 1 in Minxiong	30.966	19.241	
Cty 165	Prov 18 in Zhongpu	Prov 1 in Guantian, Tainan	37.107	23.057	Originally ran to Chiayi; Chiayi-Houzhuang became Prov 18 and Cty 135 in 1976
Cty 166	Dongshi, Chiayi	Cty 162A in Meishan, Chiayi	81.311	50.524	
Cty 167	Cty 168 in Puzi, Chiayi	Cty 168 in Taibao	14.892	9.253	
Cty 168	Dongshi, Chiayi	Cty 165 in Shuishang	32.713	20.327	
Cty 169	Meishan, Chiayi	Alishan, Chiayi	50.246	31.221	
Cty 170	Dongshi, Chiayi	Cty 163 in Lucao, Chiayi	16.954	10.535	
Cty 171	Beimen, Tainan	Cty 165 in Guantian, Tainan	38.269	23.779	
Cty 171A	Prov 19A in Madou, Tainan	Cty 171 / Cty 171B in Guantian, Tainan	3.598	2.236	Feeder road for Prov 84
Cty 171B	Cty 171 / Cty 171A in Guantian, Tainan	Prov 84 / Prov 1 in Guantian, Tainan	5.312	3.301	Feeder road for Prov 84
Cty 172	Prov 61 in Budai, Chiayi	Prov 3 in Zhongpu	55.986	34.788	
Cty 172A	Prov 1 in Houbi, Tainan	Cty 165 in Baihe, Tainan	5.238	3.255	
Cty 172B	Cty 172 in Baihe, Tainan	Cty 175 in Baihe, Tainan	7.601	4.723	
Cty 173	Cty 171 / Cty 176 in Madou, Tainan	Prov 61 / Cty 173A in Cigu, Tainan	22.881	14.218	Feeder road for Prov 61
Cty 173A	Cty 174 in Beimen, Tainan	Cty 173 in Cigu, Tainan	16.579	10.302	
Cty 174	Beimen, Tainan	Cty 175 in Dongshan, Tainan	46.312	28.777	
Cty 175	Cty 172 in Baihe, Tainan	Prov 3 in Nansi, Tainan	31.130	19.343	
Cty 176	Prov 61 / Cty 173 in Cigu, Tainan	Prov 1 in Guantian, Tainan	28.735	17.855	
Cty 177	Prov 1 in Yongkang, Tainan	Prov 1 in Rende, Tainan	15.559	9.668	
Cty 177A	Cty 177 in Yongkang, Tainan	Cty 182 in Gueiren, Tainan	7.804	4.849	
Cty 178	Prov 17A in Annan District, Tainan	Danei District, Tainan	29.686	18.446	
Cty 178A	Cty 178 in Shanshang, Tainan	Prov 20 in Shanshang, Tainan	6.082	3.779	
Cty 179					Became a portion of Prov 29 in 1993
Cty 180	Prov 20 in North District, Tainan	Prov 39 in Yongkang District, Tainan	7.683	4.774	
Cty 180A	Cty 180 in Yongkang, Tainan	Old Prov 20 in Xinhua, Tainan	7.376	4.583	
Cty 181	Prov 29 in Shanlin, Kaohsiung	Prov 27 in Gaoshu, Pingtung	19.752	12.273	
Cty 182	Prov 17 in West Central District, Tainan	Prov 3 in Neimen, Kaohsiung	34.864	21.663	
Cty 183	Nat 1 in Renwu, Kaohsiung	Prov 17 in Fengshan, Kaohsiung	17.225	10.703	
Cty 183A	Cty 183 in Fengshan, Kaohsiung	Fengshan, Kaohsiung	4.671	2.902	
Cty 183B	Cty 183 in Niaosong, Kaohsiung	Fengshan, Kaohsiung	4.891	3.039	
Cty 184	Hunei Bridge	Liugui			Became a portion of Prov 28 in 2004
Cty 185	Prov 27 in Gaoshu, Pingtung	Prov 1 in Fangliao	68.885	42.803	Foothill Highway (沿山公路)
Cty 185A	Prov 27 in Xinyuan, Pingtung	Cty 185 in Laiyi, Pingtung	19.472	12.099	
Cty 186	Prov 17 in Yong’an, Kaohsiung	Prov 29 in Dashu, Kaohsiung	34.351	21.345	
Cty 186A	Cty 186 in Dashe, Kaohsiung	Prov 29 in Dashu, Kaohsiung	12.634	7.850	
Cty 187	Prov 24 in Neipu	Prov 17 in Donggang, Pingtung	38.892	24.166	
Cty 187A	Cty 187 in Neipu, Pingtung	Cty 189A in Wandan, Pingtung	19.335	12.014	
Cty 187B	Cty 187 in Wanluan	Cty 187 in Donggang	21.570	13.403	
Cty 187C	Prov 3 in Jiuru	Cty 187 in Neipu, Pingtung	19.827	12.320	Feeder road for Freeway 3
Cty 188	Cty 183 in Fengshan, Kaohsiung	Cty 189 in Zhutian	20.838	12.948	Feeder road for Prov 88
Cty 189	Prov 3 in Pingtung City	Prov 17 in Linbian	39.936	24.815	
Cty 189A	Cty 189 in Pingtung City	Cty 188 in Wandan, Pingtung	4.800	2.983	
Cty 190	Yilan City	Prov 7 in Zhuangwei	5.326	3.309	Xianmin Avenue
Cty 191	Prov 2G in Toucheng, Yilan	Prov 7 in Yilan City	11.687	7.262	Feeder road for Freeway 5
Cty 191A	Zhuangwei	Luodong	13.012	8.085	
Cty 191B	Zhuangwei	Yilan City	3.942	2.449	
Cty 192	Jiaoxi, Yilan	Prov 2 in Zhuangwei	9.916	6.162	Was Cty 138 before 2017
Cty 192A	Longtan, Yilan City	Meiyi, Yilan City	22.231	13.814	
Cty 193	Prov 9 in Xincheng, Hualien	Prov 9 in Yuli, Hualien	110.920	68.922	Formerly Cty 195, Cty 195A and the original Cty 193; longest county road in Taiwan
Cty 194	Chihpen Forest Recreation Area in Beinan, Taitung	Prov 9 in Taitung City, Taitung	6.200	3.853	
Cty 195	Hualien Bridge	Ruisui			Became a portion of Cty 193
Cty 195A	Ruisui	Lehe			Became a portion of Cty 193
Cty 196	Prov 7C in Sanxing, Yilan	Wujie, Yilan	22.231	13.814	
Cty 196A	Luodong	Wujie, Yilan	6.238	3.876	
Cty 197	Prov 9 in Chishang, Taitung	Prov 11B in Taitung City, Taitung	59.670	37.077	
Cty 198	Shuidillao, Fangliao	Dawu, Taitung			Abolished on 1 May 2014
Cty 199	Prov 9 in Shizi, Pingtung	Prov 26 in Checheng	37.601	23.364	
Cty 199A	Cty 199 in Mudan, Pingtung	Prov 26 in Mudan, Pingtung	8.583	5.333	
Cty 200	Prov 26 in Hengchun	Prov 26 in Manzhou, Pingtung	32.824	20.396	
Cty 200A	Cty 200 in Manzhou, Pingtung	Prov 26 in Manzhou, Pingtung	3.831	2.380	
Cty 201	Cty 204 in Magong, Penghu	Makung, Penghu	10.579	6.573	
Cty 202	Cty 203 in Makung, Penghu	Huxi, Penghu	12.556	7.802	
Cty 203	Makung, Penghu	Xiyu, Penghu	36.200	22.494	
Cty 204	Cty 203 in Makung, Penghu	Cty 202 in Huxi, Penghu	10.876	6.758	
Cty 205	Makung, Penghu	Cty 204 in Makung, Penghu	7.606	4.726	
