= Highway system in Taiwan =

Highways in Taiwan are classified into five types:

Level	Name	Chinese	Taiwanese Mandarin	Taiwanese Hokkien	Taiwanese Hakka	Numbers	Notes
1	National Highways	國道	Guódào	Kok-tō	Koet-tho	1–10	Labeled as Freeway
2	Provincial Highways	省道	Shěngdào	Séng-tō	Sén-tho	1–39, 61–88	The latter are labeled as Expressway
3	County and City Highways	縣道、市道	Xiàndào, Shìdào	Koān-tō, Chhī-tō	Yen-tho, Sṳ-tho	101–205	
4	Township and District Roads	鄉道、區道	Xiāngdào, Qūdào	Hiong-tō, Khu-tō	Hiông-tho, Khî-tho		
5	Special Roads	專用公路	Zhuānyòng Gōnglù	Choan-iōng Kong-lō͘	Chôn-yung Kûng-lu		

The system does not apply to other parts of Taiwan, namely Kinmen and Lienchiang counties, and islands in the South China Sea.

Expressways in Taiwan may be controlled-access highways similar to National Freeways or limited-access roads. Most have urban roads and intra-city expressways (as opposed to Highway system) status, although some are built and maintained by cities.

== Pedestrians ==
Pedestrian safety is an issue in Taiwan and is a topic where little progress has been observed. The number of pedestrian deaths have remained mostly the same over the 2010s, from 429 deaths in 2011 to a high of 458 in 2019 to 410 in 2021. The number of injured pedestrians climbed, from 13,787 in 2011 to 15,589 in 2021.

This record is related to the lack of pedestrian-friendly infrastructure and public education on general pedestrian safety.

== The numbering system ==
As a general rule, the odd numbers represent north–south highways and even numbers represent east–west. The numbers increase moving west to east and north to south. Major north-south provincial highways are indicated by a one-digit number. Special routes of a highway use the same number, followed by a heavenly stem character (for example, National Freeway 3甲). However, for English translation, these characters are replaced by letters in the alphabetical order (for example, National Freeway 3A).

== National highways ==
National highways are freeways with controlled access. (Note: This term "freeway" means "free of signals", not "free of charge")

National highways of Taiwan

=== History ===
The first controlled-access highway, and a predecessor to the national highways in Taiwan, was the MacArthur Thruway, built in 1964 between Keelung and Taipei. Construction on the first modern national highway, National Highway 1, began in 1971. The northern section between Keelung and Zhongli was completed in 1974, and the entire freeway was completed in 1978. It runs from the northern harbor city of Keelung to the southern harbor city of Kaohsiung, while there was an 8.6-kilometre (5.3 mi) branch (No. 1A) connecting to Chiang Kai-shek International Airport (now Taiwan Taoyuan International Airport).

Construction began on the other freeways in the late 1980s. The northern section of the second north–south freeway (National Highway 3) between Xizhi and Hsinchu was completed in 1997. The No. 1A Branch was extended to link No. 3 Freeway at Yingge, Taipei, and renamed as the National Highway 2. Three other short freeways (No. 4, No. 8, and No. 10) were built to link the two north–south freeways in Taichung County (now part of Taichung City), Tainan County (now part of Tainan City), and Kaohsiung County (now part of Kaohsiung City), respectively. The entire No. 3 Freeway was completed in January 2004.

To ease the congestion of No. 1 Freeway in the Taipei metropolitan area, a 20-kilometre (12 mi) viaduct was built in 1997 along the original freeway between Xizhi and the Wugu District of New Taipei to serve as a bypass for traffic not exiting and entering the freeway within Taipei.

The construction of a freeway connecting the Taipei metropolitan area and Yilan County began in 1991 and was completed in June 2006. It includes a 12.9-kilometre (8.0 mi) tunnel (Hsuehshan Tunnel), which is the ninth-longest road tunnel in the world. An extension from Yilan County to Hualien County is planned. However, its construction is being delayed by environmental concerns.

On January 2, 2014, the toll system was converted to a distance-based one. Tolls are no longer collected at toll booths but automatically by electronic toll collection (ETC).

=== Features ===
==== Length, exits, and entrances ====
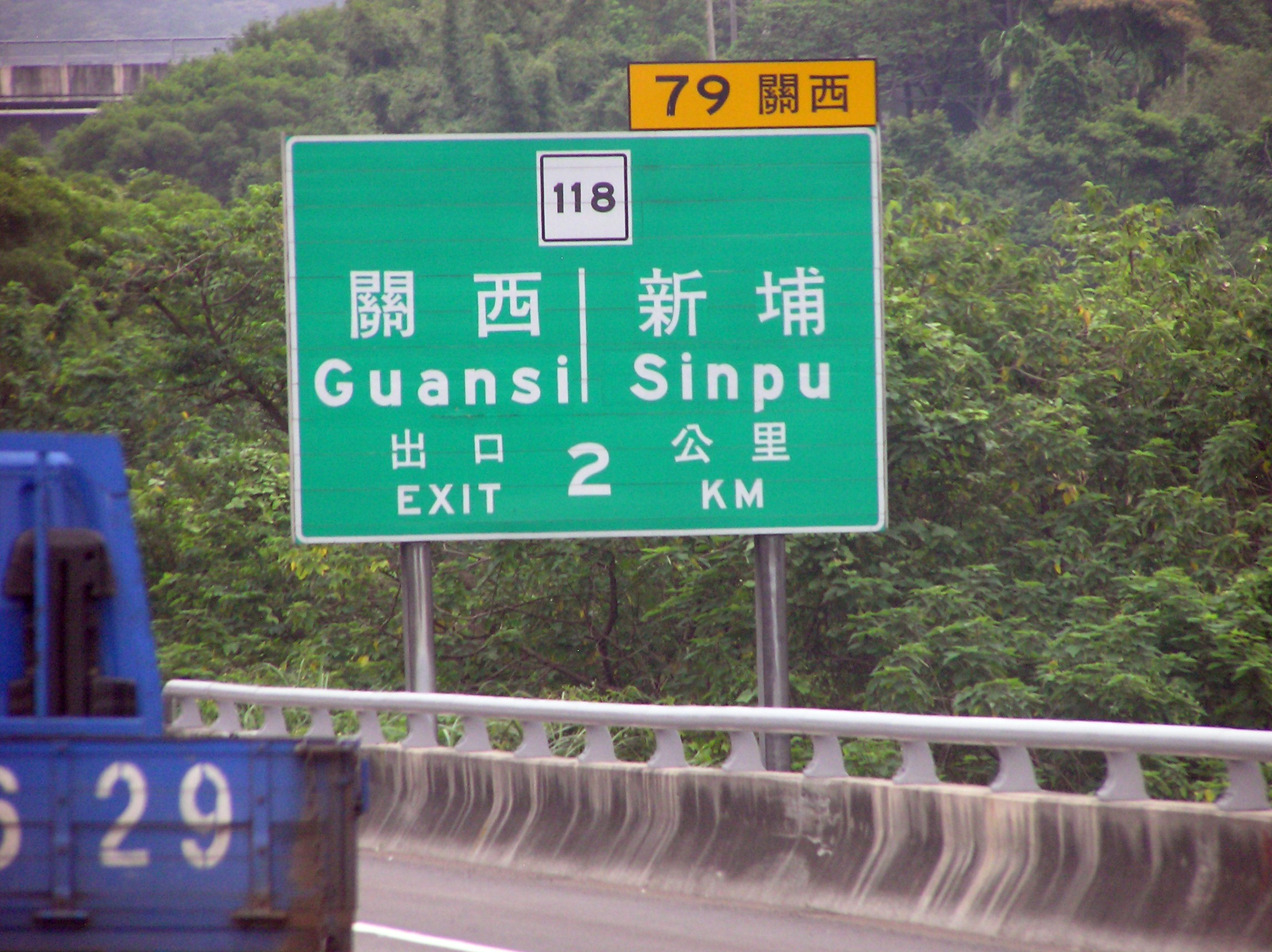
Exit advance

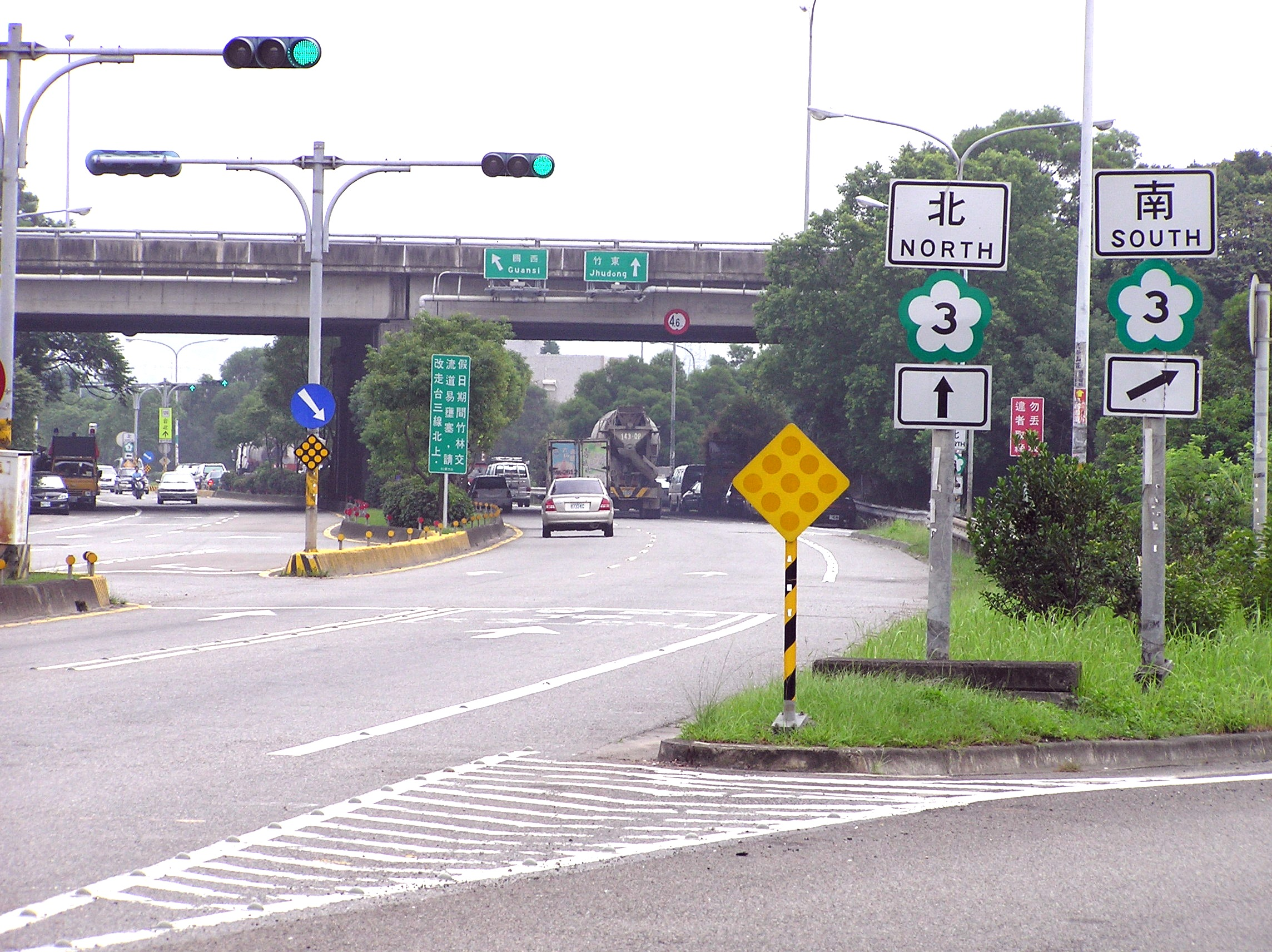
Freeway entrance

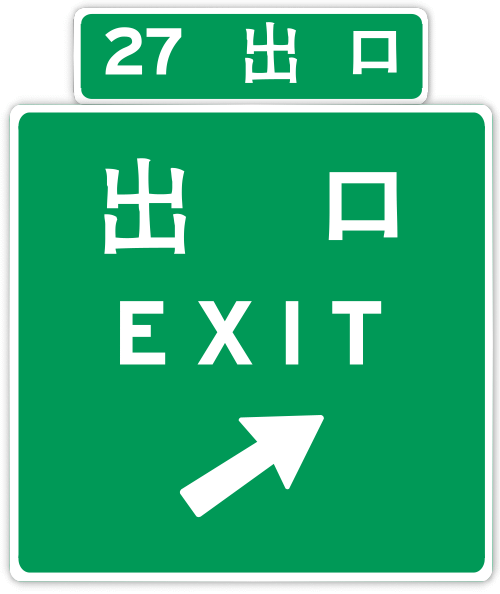
The pre-2006 Taiwan freeway exit sign. The 27 indicates that the exit is the 27th exit, calculated from the northernmost / westernmost point of the freeway.

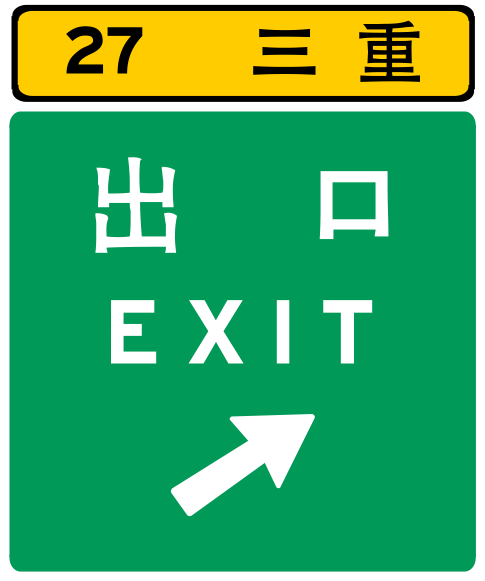
The post-2005 Taiwan freeway exit sign. The 27 indicates that the exit is located at the 27th kilometer, calculating from the northernmost / westernmost point of the freeway. Provincial expressways also allow it in 2007.

Every one tenth of a kilometer is marked on the freeway with Arabic numerals to indicate freeway mileage, which indicates the number of kilometers away from the northern end or western end of the freeway. Exit numbers are based on the freeway mileage. With the notable exception of exit-only signs, which are only expressed in Chinese (but with a right arrow indicating an exit-only lane), exit notification and system route reminder signs in the freeway system are almost identical to their US counterparts.

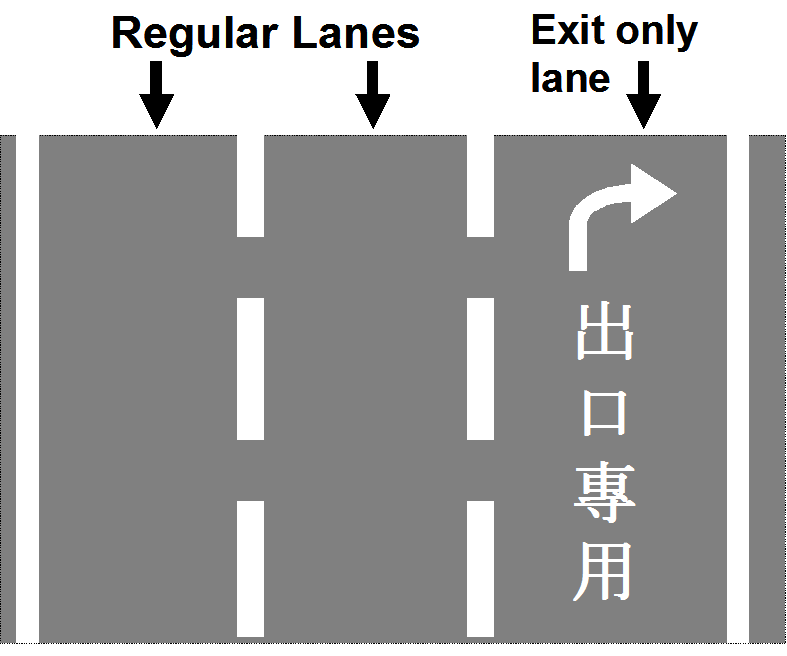
A diagram that distinguishes an exit only lane from the regular lanes. The exit only lane has a right-turn arrow symbol and Chinese characters that say "Exit exclusive lane."

There are four types of exit notification signs. The first notification sign appears two kilometers before the exit, providing the destination name and an Exit 2 km notice. The second sign appears one kilometer before the exit, providing the destination name and a Right Lane notice. The Right Lane notice warns the exiting driver to start switching to the right lane in preparation to exit and does not necessarily indicate that the right lane is an exit-only lane. The third sign appears a few hundred meters before the exit, providing the destination name and a right tilted arrow. The fourth sign is located at the exit and says Exit with a tilted right arrow.

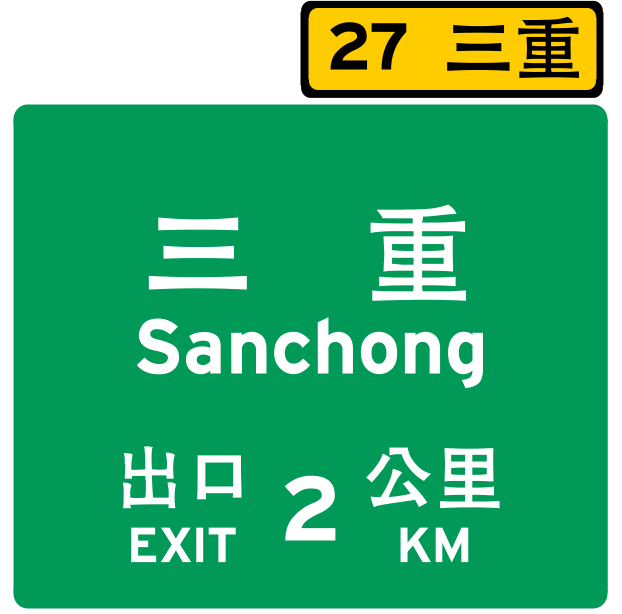
Sign that indicates that the exit is two kilometers away.

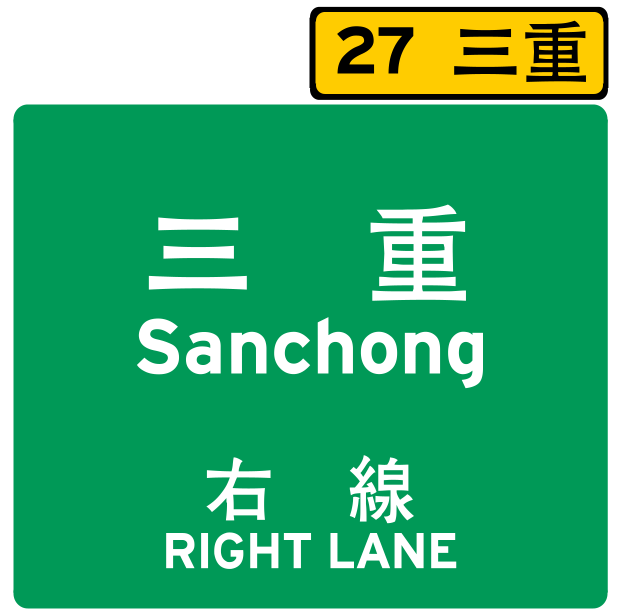
Sign that indicates that the exit is one kilometer away.

Exit notification signs were slightly altered in December 2005. The green exit mileage label on top of the exit notification sign has been replaced with a yellow exit mileage label accompanied with the Chinese code name of the interchange. The Chinese code name of the interchange does not necessarily reflect the destinations listed on the exit signs and may represent the general location of the freeway interchange.

Long rectangular-dash dividers usually separate normal lanes. Short rectangular-dash dividers usually indicates a lane that is ready to turn into an exit, a merging lane, or a lane reserved for vehicles that have difficulty climbing high grade regions of the freeway.

Freeway entrances may have traffic lights to control the flow of vehicles entering the freeway.

==== Speed limit ====
The speed limit for cars on Taiwan's freeways range from 80 km/h (50 mph) on Freeway No. 5 (north of Toucheng, Yilan) to 110 km/h (68 mph) on Freeway No. 3 (south of Tucheng, New Taipei). The speed limit for trucks are usually 10 km/h lower. In non-traffic jam conditions, a vehicle must travel at least 60 km/h (37 mph).

Speed limits are enforced through radar activated cameras that take pictures of speed-violating cars. Because of protests, yellow warning signs are given in advance in Chinese of approaching radar activated cameras.

==== Following distances ====
As tailgating poses serious hazards of rear-ending, Article 6 of the Freeway and Expressway Traffic Control Regulation (Chinese: 高速公路及快速公路交通管制規則) requires the following minimum following distances when the weather is fine:

Speed	Minimum distance per large vehicle (大型車)	Minimum distance per small vehicle (小型車)
60 km/h	40 m	30 m
70 km/h	50 m	35 m
80 km/h	60 m	40 m
90 km/h	70 m	45 m
100 km/h	80 m	50 m
110 km/h	90 m	55 m

Longer following distance is required in the Hsuehshan Tunnel.

==== Traveling through tunnels ====
In the tunnel portions of freeways, lane change is prohibited when the lane divider consists of two parallel solid lines, used when lane change is considered unsafe should a collision cause a vehicular fire. Headlights must be turned on when traveling through tunnels; this is enforced by special cameras. Unlawful lane change or failure to turn on headlights in a tunnel is subject to an administrative fine of 3000 new Taiwan dollars.

Additional restrictions apply for the Hsuehshan Tunnel on Freeway No. 5, which is the longest tunnel in the entire system.

==== Prohibited traffic ====
Article 19 of the Freeway and Expressway Traffic Control Regulation prohibits uses of and entries onto the freeways by:

1. Pedestrians.
2. Military troops marching or conducting drills.
3. Non-motorized vehicles
4. Motorcycles (see also Restrictions on motorcycle use on freeways#Taiwan for more information).
5. Three-wheel motor vehicles or motorized pedicabs.
6. Farm machineries.
7. Motorized machineries not being motor vehicles.
8. Towed vehicles not disabled on the freeways or expressways.

==== Electronic toll collection ====
Odd-numbered freeways have tolls, which are automatically collected by ETC. The current rate for cars is (NT$1.2/km up to 200 km) + (NT$0.9/excess km), km being kilometers traveled per day. The first 20 km per day is free and thus deducted from the distance. Freeways may be used directly, but users are advised to apply for an “eTag”, which is free and when equipped gives 10% discounts and allows you to store pre-paid money for tolls. The eTag can also be set to pay tolls automatically with credit card or a savings account. Users without the eTag pay tolls at convenience stores 3 days after usage and if not, bills will be mailed to car owners.

=== Service and Rest Areas ===
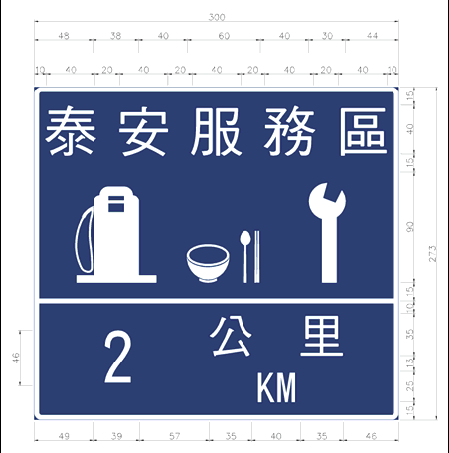
Service Area Ahead

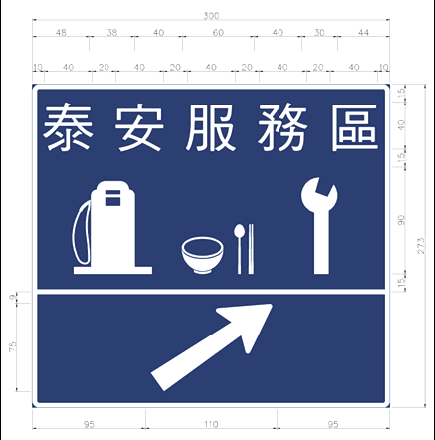
Exit to Service Area

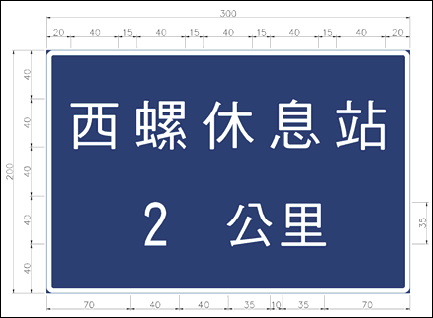
Rest Area Ahead

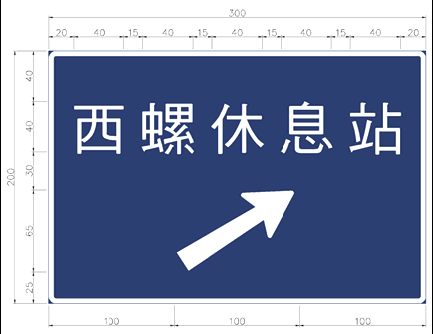
Exit to Rest Area

Freeway service and rest areas start appearing south of Taoyuan City on the No. 1 and No. 3 freeways. Most rest areas provide gas stations, gift shops, convenience stores, and food courts. The Qingshui rest area located on the 172.4 km mileage marker of National Highway No. 3 is so popular that visitors can only park for 45 minutes and are prohibited from barbecuing.

The first drivers' lounges opened in 1982 and 1983. However to save on operating costs, all had closed by 1991. To reduce traffic incidents, the drivers' lounges were reopened starting in October 2011. Fourteen of fifteen freeway service and rest areas have drivers' lounges. The Shiding Service Area on National Freeway No. 5, serving New Taipei, does not. All available lounges, besides Su'ao, offer 24-hour service.

=== List of national highways ===
Map of national highways

There are eight national highways as of 2011. They are administered by the National Freeway Bureau.

- No. 1 (Keelung City - Qianzhen, Kaohsiung): 374.4 km, completed on October 31, 1978
  - No. 1A (Zhuwei, Dayuan District - Guishan District): Planned; No. 1A originally ran from Taoyuan International Airport to the airport interchange; this is now part of National Freeway No. 2
- No. 2 (Taoyuan International Airport - Yingge, New Taipei): 20.4 km, completed on August 24, 1997
  - No. 2A (Dayuan District, Taoyuan - Dayuan District, Taoyuan): 2.6 km, completed on January 9, 2023
- No. 3 (Dawulun, Keelung City - Linbian, Pingtung): 432.0 km, completed on January 11, 2004
  - No. 3A (Da'an, Taipei City - Shenkeng, Taipei): 5.6 km, completed on March 21, 1996
- No. 4 (Qingshui, Taichung - Tanzi, Taichung): 28.0 km, completed in November 2001
- No. 5 (Nangang, Taipei City - Su-ao, Yilan): 54.3 km, completed on January 16, 2006
- No. 6 (Wufeng, Taichung - Puli, Nantou): 37.6 km, completed on March 21, 2009
- No. 7 (Kaohsiung Port to Freeway 10): Currently under construction
- No. 8 (Annan, Tainan City - Xinhua, Tainan): 15.5 km, completed in February 2000
- No. 10 (Zuoying, Kaohsiung City - Cishan, Kaohsiung): 33.8 km, completed in February 2000

== Provincial Highways ==
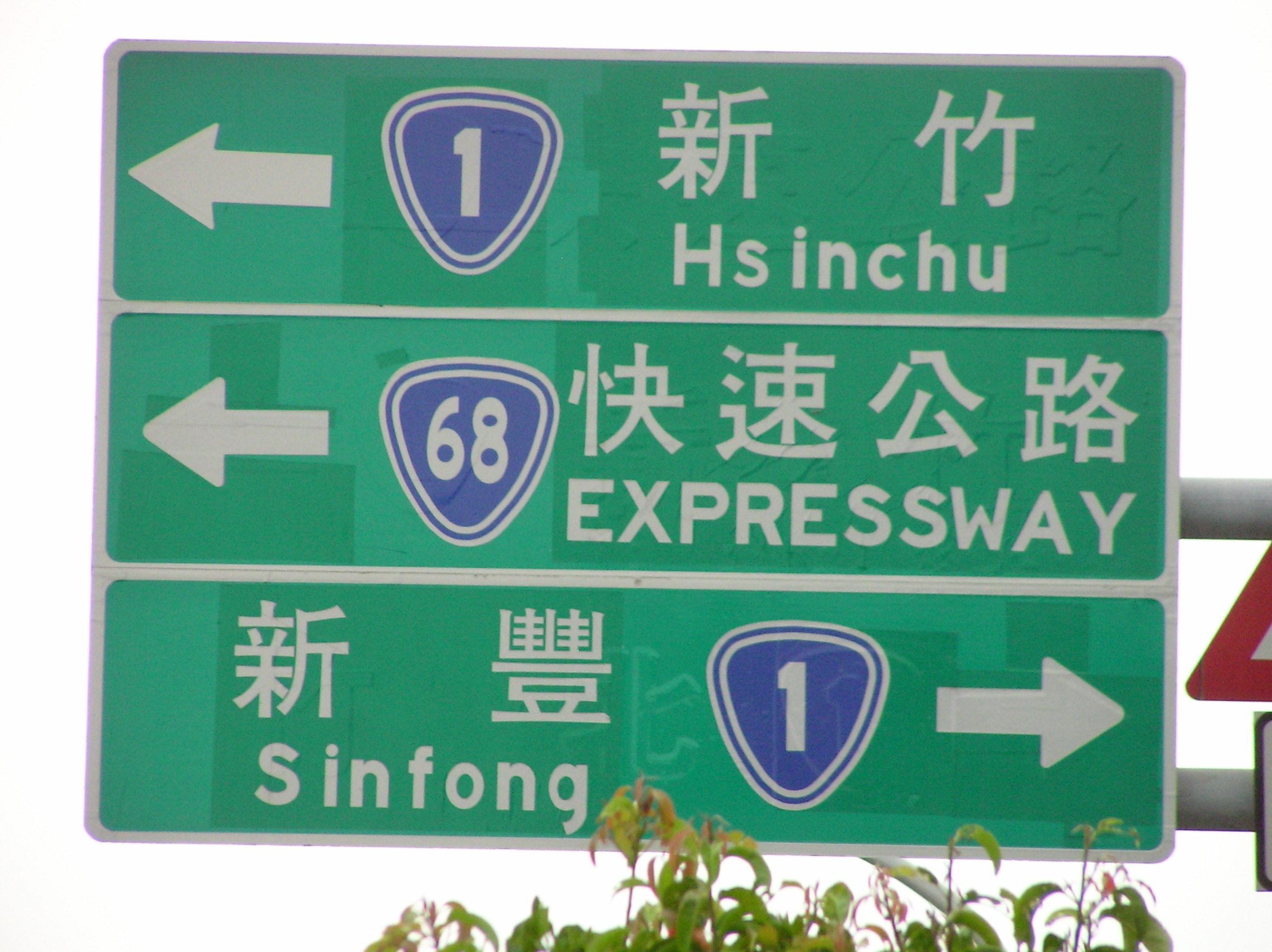
Taiwan Highways 1 and 68 near Hsinchu

Provincial highways (of the Taiwan Province) are administered by Directorate General of Highways under Department of Transportation and Communications since 1999. Before the mid-1990s, the route numbers of provincial highways were limited to 1–27. In 1992, planning started for 12 east–west expressways and the West Coast Expressway, indicated by route numbers greater than 60, to ease the congestion in the freeways. Some of these expressways are still under construction.

Many of these provincial highways cross through the special municipalities (i.e. Kaohsiung, New Taipei, Taichung, Tainan, Taipei) which are not part of Taiwan Province. Officially, provincial highways are now known as Taiwan highways, but many people still refer to them as provincial roads (Chinese: 省道; pinyin: Shěng Dào).

In 2007, provincial expressways started using the same exit notification signs that national freeways started using in 2006.

The following is a list of all provincial highways as of 2 August 2006:

Ordinary Provincial Highways (blue) and Expressways (red), Bypass (green)

=== Ordinary Provincial Highways ===
- 1 (Executive Yuan, Taipei - Fenggang, Pingtung): This is the historical north–south highway (縱貫公路).
  - 1A (Executive Yuan, Taipei - Taoyuan District, Taoyuan)
  - 1B (Daya, Taichung - Wangtian, Taichung)
  - 1C (Changhua City bypass)
  - 1D (Citong - Douliu)
  - 1E (Kaohsiung - Houzhuang)
  - 1F (Zhunan - Luzhunan)
- 2 (Guandu, Taipei - Suao): North Coast Highway (北部濱海公路)
  - 2A (Jinshan, New Taipei City - Taipei)
  - 2B (Taipei - Tamsui, New Taipei City)
  - 2C (Nuannuan, Keelung - Gongliao, New Taipei City)
  - 2D (Badu, Keelung - Rueibin, New Taipei)
  - 2E (Wujie - Suao)
  - 2F (Dawuluan, Keelung - Keelung Harbor): An extension of Freeway 3.
  - 2G (Toucheng, Yilan)
- 3 (Executive Yuan, Taipei - Pingtung City): Inner Mountain Highway (內山公路)
  - 3A (Caotun - Nantou City)
  - 3B (Daxi, Taoyuan - Shimen Dam
  - 3C (Zhushan, Nantou - Jiji, Nantou)
- 4 (Dayuan, Taoyuan - Shimen Reservoir): Taoyuan Highway (桃大公路)
- 5 (Executive Yuan, Taipei - Keelung): North-South Highway (北基公路)
  - 5A (Zhangshuwan, New Taipei - Liudu, Keelung)
  - 5B (Xizhi bypass): Decommissioned in 2013.
- 6 (Houlong, Miaoli - Shitan, Miaoli)
- 7 (Daxi, Taoyuan - Zhuangwei): Northern Cross-Island Highway (北部橫貫公路)
  - 7A (Qilan - Lishan)
  - 7B (Sanxia, New Taipei - Fuxing, Taoyuan)
  - 7C (Datong, Yilan - Wujie, Yilan)
  - 7D (Shuanglianpi, Yuanshan - Yilan)
- 8 (Dongshi, Taichung - Taroko, Hualien) (Central Cross-Island Highway, 中部橫貫公路): This highway was severely damaged between Guguan and Deji by the 1999 Jiji earthquake although the Guguan-Lishan section opened to limited traffic in 2018.
  - 8A (Baxin - Deji): This highway was severely damaged in the 1999 Jiji earthquake and has been shut down since.
- 9 (Taipei - Fenggang, Pingtung): The highway runs through the eastern part of Taiwan. It is the longest highway in Taiwan.
  - 9A (Xindian, New Taipei - Wulai, New Taipei)
  - 9B (Beinan-Taitung City bypass)
  - 9C (Hualien - Shoufeng)
  - 9D (Su'ao - Xiulin): old routing of PH 9.
  - 9E (Daren - Shizi): old routing of PH 9.
  - Suhua Improve(Limited-access)
  - South Link Highway Improve(Limited-access)
- 10 (Taichung Harbor - Fengyuan, Taichung)
  - 10A (Daya-Shengang-Fengyuan): Absorbed into PH 10; the former route of PH 10 became part of PH 1B.
  - 10B (Qingshui - Shalu)
- 11 (Hualien City - Taitung City): Hualien-Taitung Coastal Highway (花東海岸公路) and East Coast Highway (東部濱海公路)
  - 11A (Guangfu - Fengbin); old routing of PH 11.
  - 11B (Taitung City); old routing of PH 11.
  - 11C (Ji'an - Shoufeng)
- 12 (Taichung Harbor - Taichung): Taiwan Boulevard (臺灣大道)
  - 12A (Taichung - Nanwangtian): Absorbed into PH 1B in 1993.
- 13 (Xiangshan, Hsinchu - Fengyuan, Taichung): Jianfeng Highway (尖豐公路)
  - 13A (Zhunan - Miaoli City); old routing of PH 13.
- 14 (Changhua - Lushan, Nantou)
  - 14A (Wushe, Nantou - Dayuling, Hualien); old routing of PH 14.
  - 14B (Fenyuan, Changhua - Nantou City)
  - 14C (Changhua City alternate)
  - 14D (Fenyuan, Changhua - Nantou City)
- 15 (Guandu, Taipei - Hsinchu): Xibin Highway (西濱公路)
  - 15A (PH 15 to PH 61 in Dayuan, Taoyuan City): Absorbed into PH 4 in 2026.
- 16 (Mingjian - Xinyi, Nantou)
  - 16A (Shuidiliao - Shuili): Decommissioned in 2003; the section from Shuidiliao to Linwei became a portion of PH 3C and the remainder downgraded to Township Road 27.
- 17 (Jianan, Taichung - Shuidiliao, Pingtung): West Coast Highway (西部濱海公路)
  - 17A (Annan, Tainan - Hunei, Kaohsiung)
  - 17B (PH 17 to PH 17A in Annan, Tainan)
- 18 (Chiayi - Tatajia, Xinyi): New Central Cross-Island Highway (新中橫公路) and Alishan Highway (阿里山公路)
- 19 (Changhua - Tainan): Central Highway (中央公路)
  - 19A (Yanshuei, Tainan - Zihguan, Kaohsiung)
- 20 (Tainan - Haiduan, Taitung): Southern Cross-Island Highway (南部橫貫公路)
  - 20A (Chulai - Chishang)
  - 20B (Zuozhen - Nanhua)
- 21 (Dongshi, Taichung - Tataka, Xinyi)
  - 21A (ring road around Sun Moon Lake)
- 22 (Nanzih, Kaohsiung - Gaoshu): Qinan Highway (旗楠公路). Previously a portion of County Road 188 until 1993.
- 23 (Fuli, Hualien - Donghe, Taitung): Fudong Highway (富東公路) or Dongfu Highway (東富公路)
- 24 (Pingtung City - Wutai, Pingtung): Wutai Highway (霧台公路). Was Highway 22 until 1993. A section in Wutai was severely damaged in 2009 by Typhoon Morakot and has been shut down since.
  - 24A (Kenting - Kenting National Forest Recreation Area): Downgraded to Pingtung Special Highway 2 in 1994.
- 25 (Fongshan, Kaohsiung - Linyuan, Kaohsiung): Fenglin Highway (鳳林公路)
- 26 (Fenggang, Pingtung - Daren, Taitung): South Coast Highway (南部濱海公路), Ping-E Highway (屏鵝公路) and Jia-E Highway (佳鵝公路)
- 27 (Laonong, Kaohsiung - Wunong, Pingtung)
  - 27A (Liouguei to PH 28)
- 28 (Hunei, Kaohsiung - Liouguei, Kaohsiung)
- 29 (Namasia, Kaohsiung - Linyuan, Kaohsiung): Dalin Highway (達林公路). Was a portion of Highway 21 until 2014.
- 30 (Zhuoxi, Hualien - Changbin, Taitung)
- 31 (Luzhu, Taoyuan - Hukou, Hsinchu)
- 37 (Xingang, Chiayi - Lucao, Chiayi)
- 39 (Xinhua, Tainan - Alian, Kaohsiung)
- 61B (Shengang to national freeway 3, Hemei Interchange)
- 63A (PH 63 to PH 14 in Caotun, Nantou)

==== Quasi Expressways ====
- 63 (South District, Taichung - Caotun, Nantou) (Zhongtou Highway, 中投公路)
- 68A (controlled-access) (PH 68 to County Road 123)
- 74A (controlled-access) (PH 74, Kuaiguan IC to PH 1 in Huatan, Changhua)

=== Expressways ===
- 61 (Tamsui District - Cigu District) (West Coast Expressway, 西濱快速道路)
  - 61A (PH 15 to Port of Taipei): Absorbed into PH 61 in 2020.
- 62 (Dawulun, Keelung - Madong, Keelung and Ruifang District - Ruibin, New Taipei)
  - 62A (Keelung Harbor to PH 62, Sijiaoting IC)
- 64 (Bali District - Zhonghe District)
- 65 (Wugu District - Tucheng District)
- 66 (Guanyin District, Taoyuan City - Daxi District, Taoyuan City)
- 68 (Nanliao, Hsinchu - Zhudong, Hsinchu)
  - 68A (Small spur of original main route)
- 72 (Houlong, Miaoli - Shitan, Miaoli)
- 74 (PH 3, Kuaiguan IC to PH 3, Wufeng IC)
- 76 (Puyan, Changhua - Caotun, Nantou)
- 78 (Taixi, Yunlin - Gukeng, Yunlin)
- 82 (Dongshi, Chiayi - Shuishang, Chiayi)
- 84 (Beimen, Tainan - Yujing, Tainan)
- 86 (South District, Tainan - Guanmiao, Tainan)
- 88 (Fongshan District - Zhutian)

Since July 1, 2006, the Freeway and Expressway Traffic Control Regulation (Chinese: 高速公路及快速公路交通管制規則) applies the same traffic rules on the freeways to the expressways, including the same prohibited traffic and following distances. While motorcycles remain generally banned from the expressways, Article 19 of the Freeway and Expressway Traffic Control Regulation makes it officially possible to allow a motorcycle with a cylinder capacity of more than 550 cm^{3} on certain expressways subject to the following restrictions:

1. No sharing the same lane to drive side by side with or to overtake another vehicle, not even another motorcycle
2. Headlight on at all times

A trial program to allow a motorcycle with a cylinder capacity of more than 550 cm^{3} on Provincial Highway 68 and Provincial Highway 72 started in January 2005 for one year and was extended an additional year. On July 2, 2006, more than 1500 Taiwanese motorcyclists took to the streets in Taipei to demand more open highways; Provincial Highways 68 and 72 were the only Taiwanese expressways open to high-end motorcycles.

Since 2007, a motorcycle with a cylinder capacity of at least 550 cm^{3} may be driven on expressways but not freeways. This major change has resulted in mixed reactions.

== County and city Highways ==
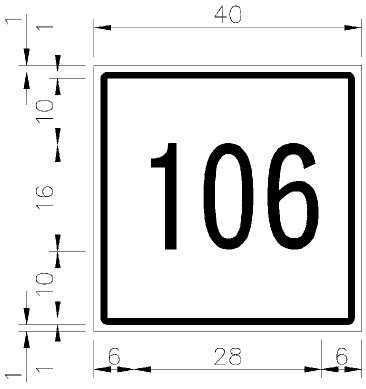
Taiwanese Guide Sign G3: County and City Route

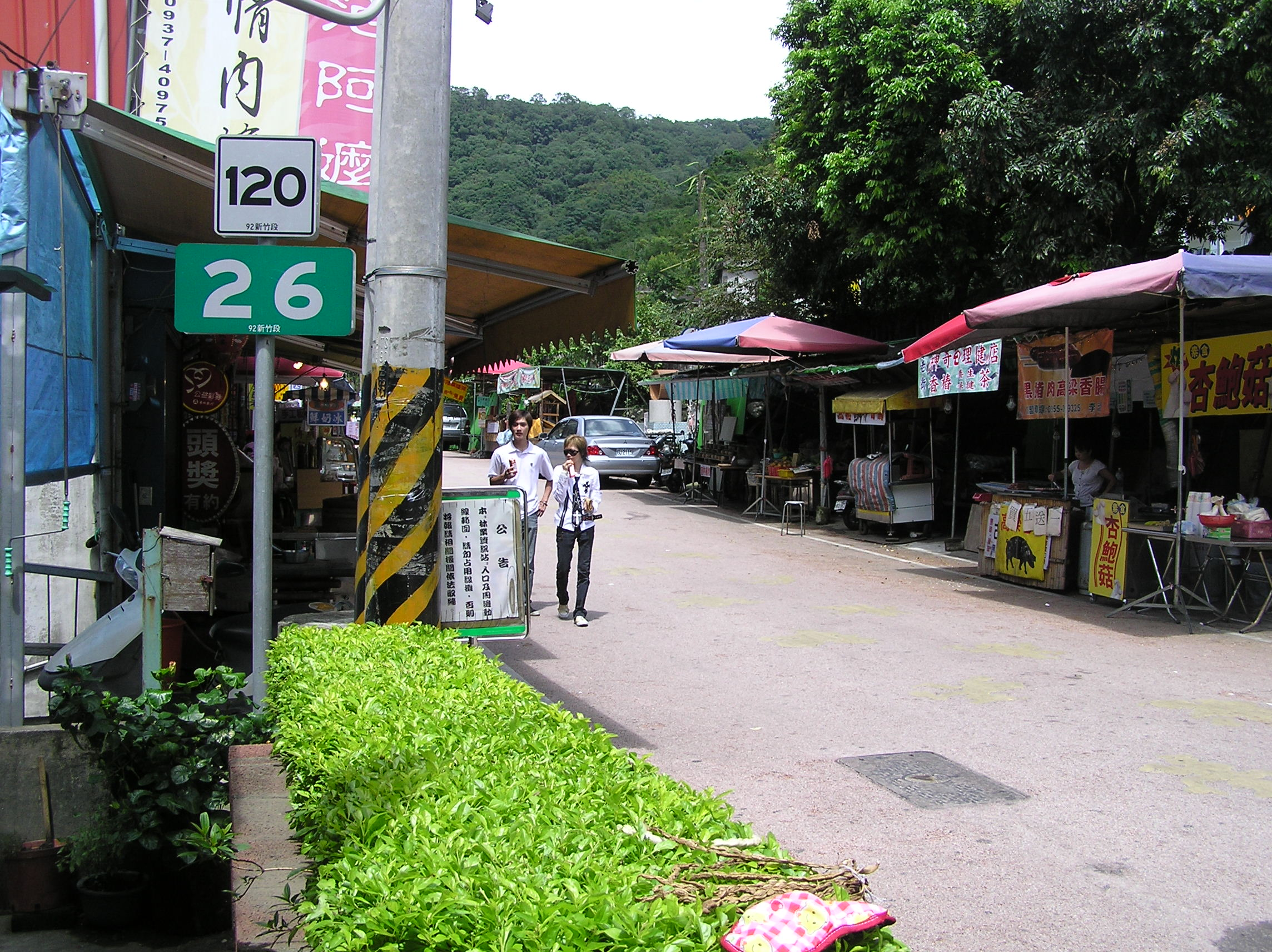
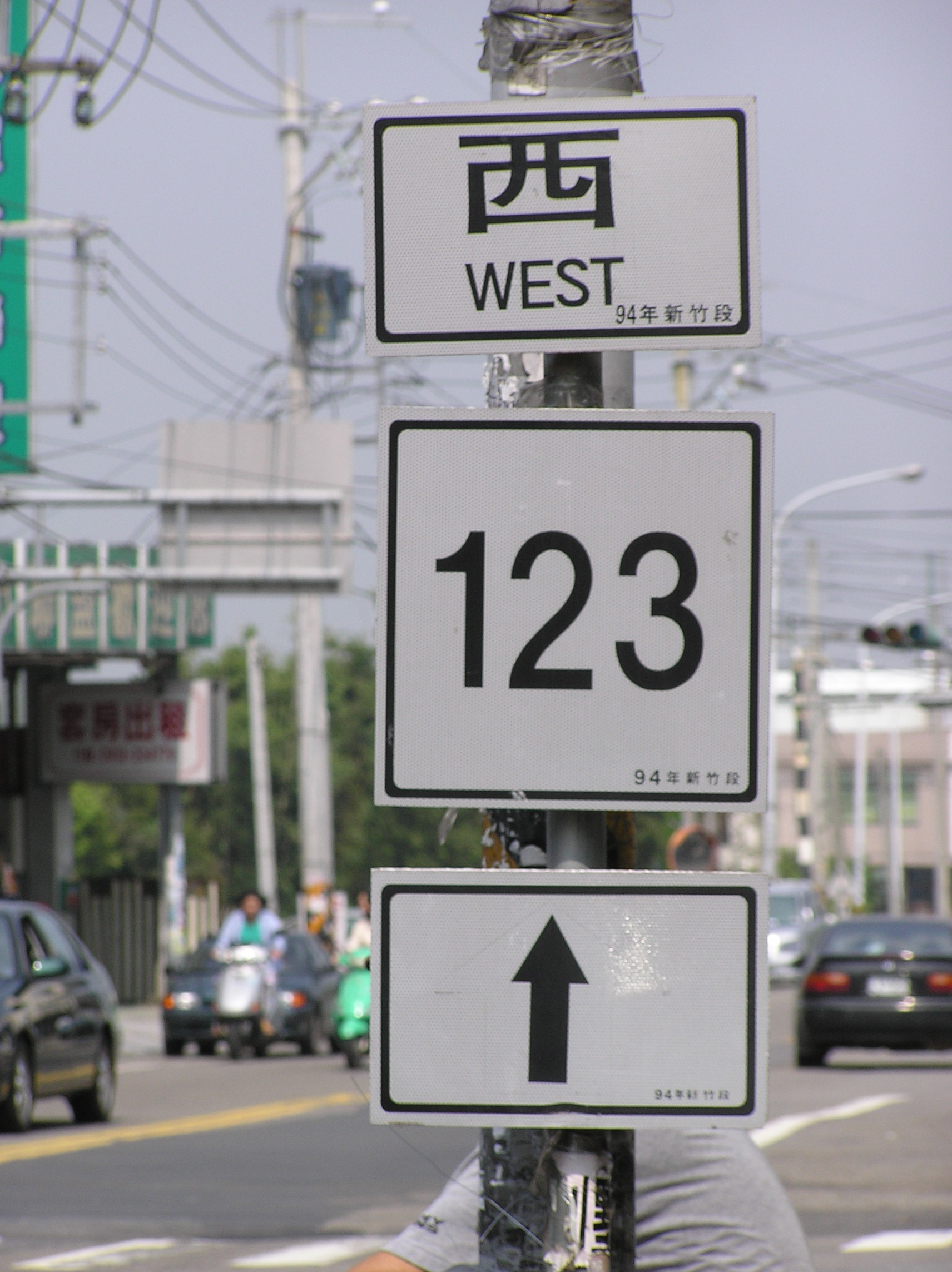

County and city highways are numbered from 101 to 205 since the numbered highways in Penghu (Pescadores) are incorporated into the system. Including those branch lines, there are totally 147 county and city highways, and the total length stretches over 3,500 kilometres. The lowest number 101 is in New Taipei City. The route numbers generally increase moving north to south. Route No. 200 is in Pingtung. Routes No. 201 to 205 are in Penghu. County highways numbered 179, 184, 195 are nonexistent.

== Township and District Roads ==
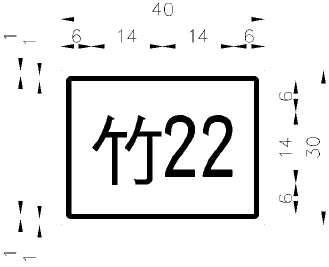
Taiwanese Guide Sign G4: Township and District Route

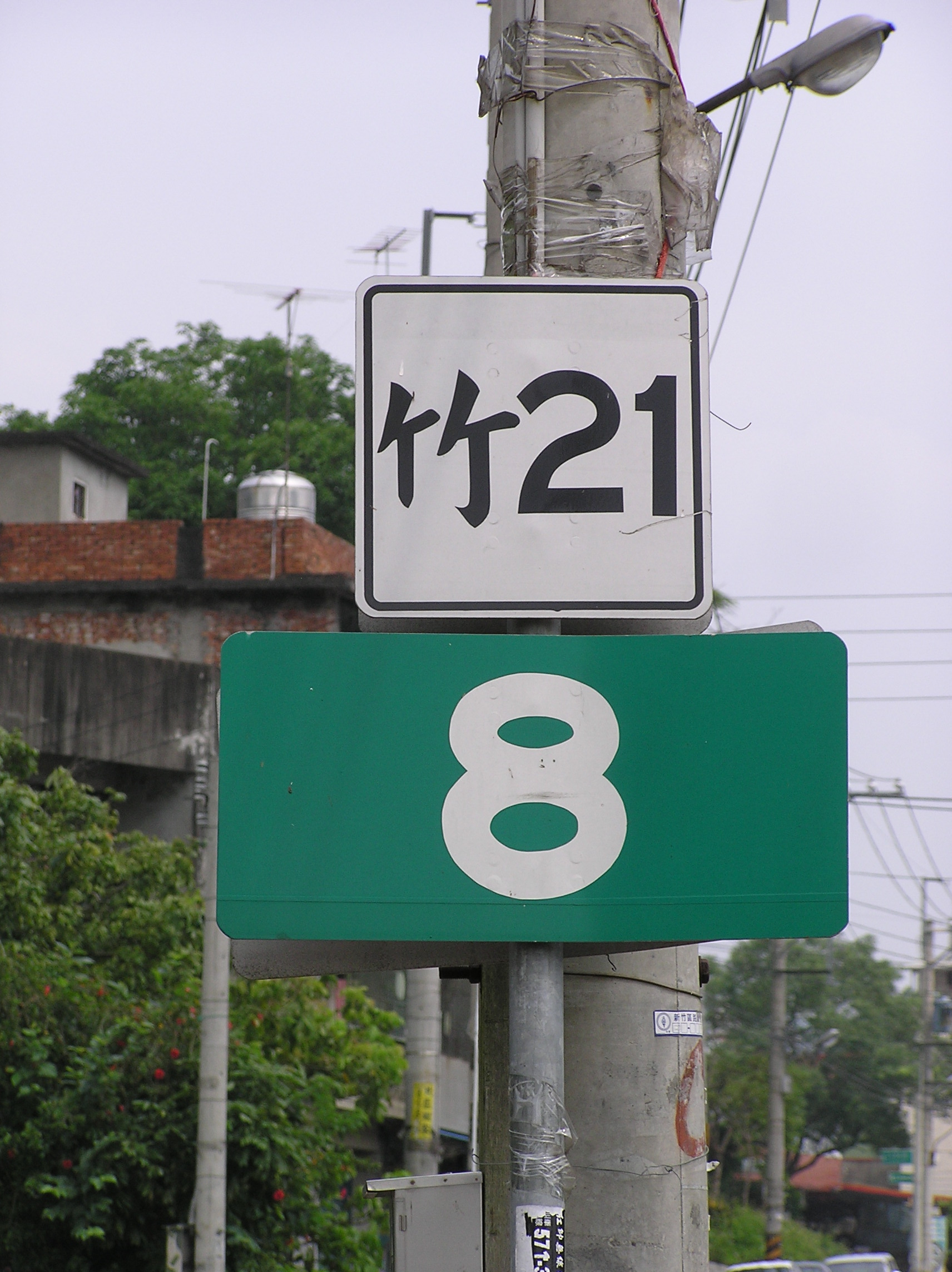
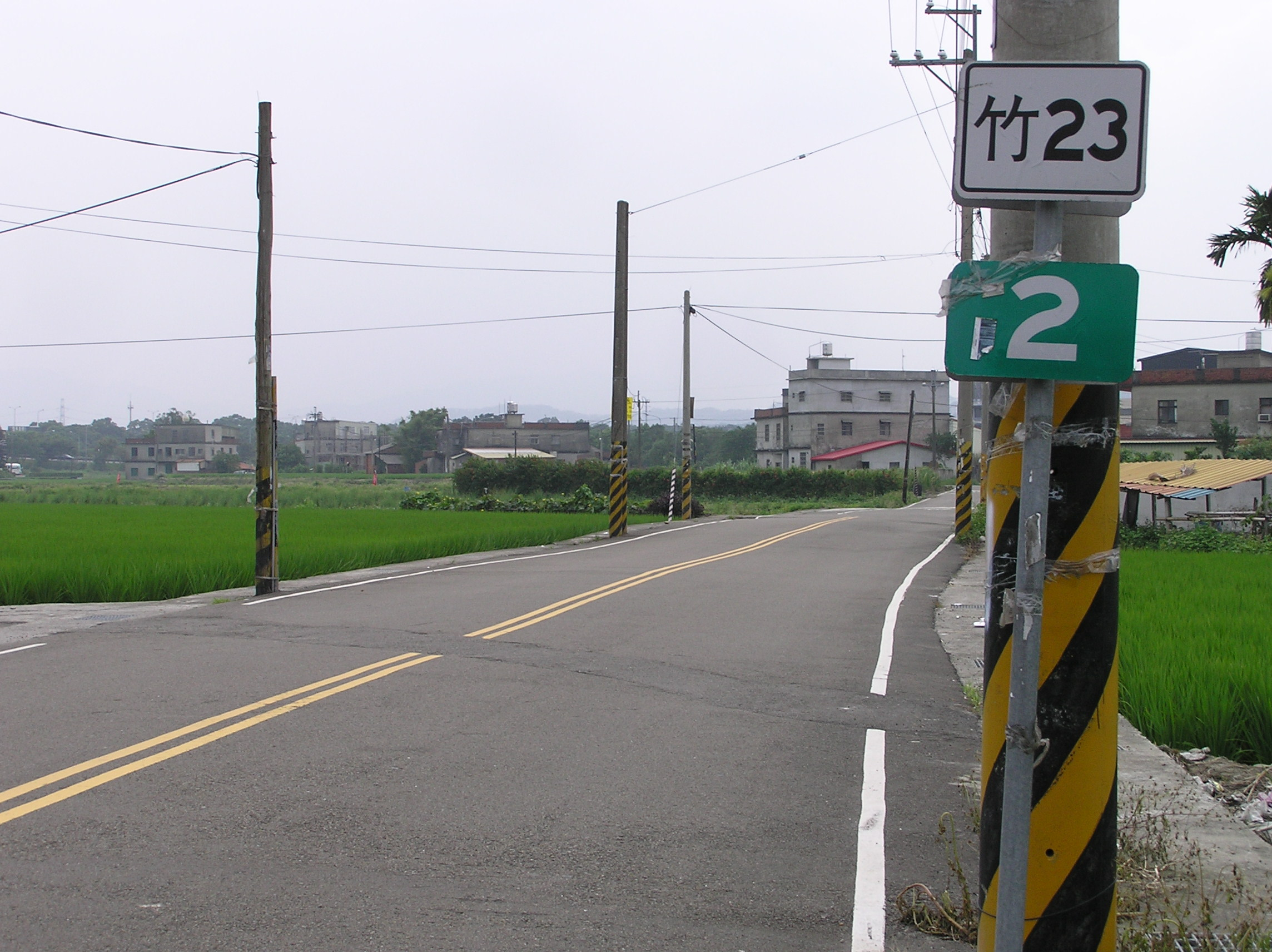

A Township or District Road is prefixed the abbreviation of the county or city in a Chinese character where it is located. For example, the sample signs above show Hsinchu Roads No. 22, 21, and 23. These roads are almost always two-lane undivided roads, especially if not carrying two highways in one roadway. In some cases, they may weave through urban neighbourhoods and are treated like lanes or alleys.

== Special Roads ==
Special Roads (Exclusive Roads) in Taiwan are roads built by the government, but maintained and operated by private companies. They are rarely used and appear in certain places, most commonly in mountainous reigons, such as the Daxueshan Road, the longest and most popular special road.

== See also ==
- Transportation in Taiwan
