= MacArthur Bridge =

MacArthur Bridge may refer to:

- MacArthur Bridge (St. Louis), a bridge in St. Louis, Missouri, United States
- MacArthur Bridge (Detroit), a bridge in Detroit, Michigan, United States
- MacArthur Bridge (Burlington), a bridge in Burlington, Iowa, United States (replaced with the Great River Bridge)
- MacArthur Bridge (Manila), a bridge in Manila, Philippines
- Collection of two bridges across the Keelung River as part of the MacArthur Thruway in Taipei.
