= Provincial Highway 19 (Taiwan) =

Provincial highway in Taiwan

Provincial Highway 19
- 台19線
- Central Highway

Route information
- Maintained by Directorate General of Highways
- Length: 140.195 km (87.113 mi)

Major junctions
- North end: Prov 1 in Changhua City
- Nat 1 in Changhua City; Nat 8 in Anding
- South end: Prov 1 in Yongkang, Tainan City

Location
- Country: Taiwan

Highway system
- Highway system in Taiwan
← Prov 18	→ Prov 20

Provincial Highway 19 (PH 19, Chinese: 台19線) is a north–south highway from Changhua City in Changhua County to Yongkang in Tainan City. The highway is known as Central Highway (中央公路). The highway lies between the coastal PH 17 and the inland PH 1 which serves many of the major cities in central and southern Taiwan. The total length of the highway is 140.195 kilometres (87.113 mi).

== Route description ==
The highway begins at the intersection with PH 1 in downtown Changhua City. After the intersection with Freeway 1, the highway continues south and meets PH 76 in Puyan, Changhua County, PH 78 in Yuanchang, Yunlin County, PH 82 in Puzi, Chiayi County, as well as PH 84 in Syuejia, Tainan City. The highway meets with Freeway 8 in Anding, before ending at the urban district of Yongkang, Tainan City, at the intersection with PH 1.

The highway passes through the following counties and cities: Changhua County, Yunlin County, Chiayi County, and Tainan City.

== Spur routes ==
- Prov 19a: The highway connects the parent route in Yanshuei, Tainan City, with PH 17 in Zihguan, Kaohsiung County. The highway is also the longest spur routes in the provincial highway system. The total length is 78.693 kilometres (48.898 mi).

== See also ==
- Highway system in Taiwan
