= Provincial Highway 5 (Taiwan) =

Provincial highway in Taiwan

Provincial Highway 5
- 台5線
- Taipei-Keelung Highway

Route information
- Maintained by Directorate General of Highways
- Length: 27.916 km (17.346 mi)

Major junctions
- South end: Prov 1 Prov 1a Prov 3 Prov 9 in Zhongzheng District, Taipei
- Nat 3 in Xizhi
- North end: Port of Keelung, Keelung

Location
- Country: Taiwan

Highway system
- Highway system in Taiwan
← Prov 4	→ Prov 6

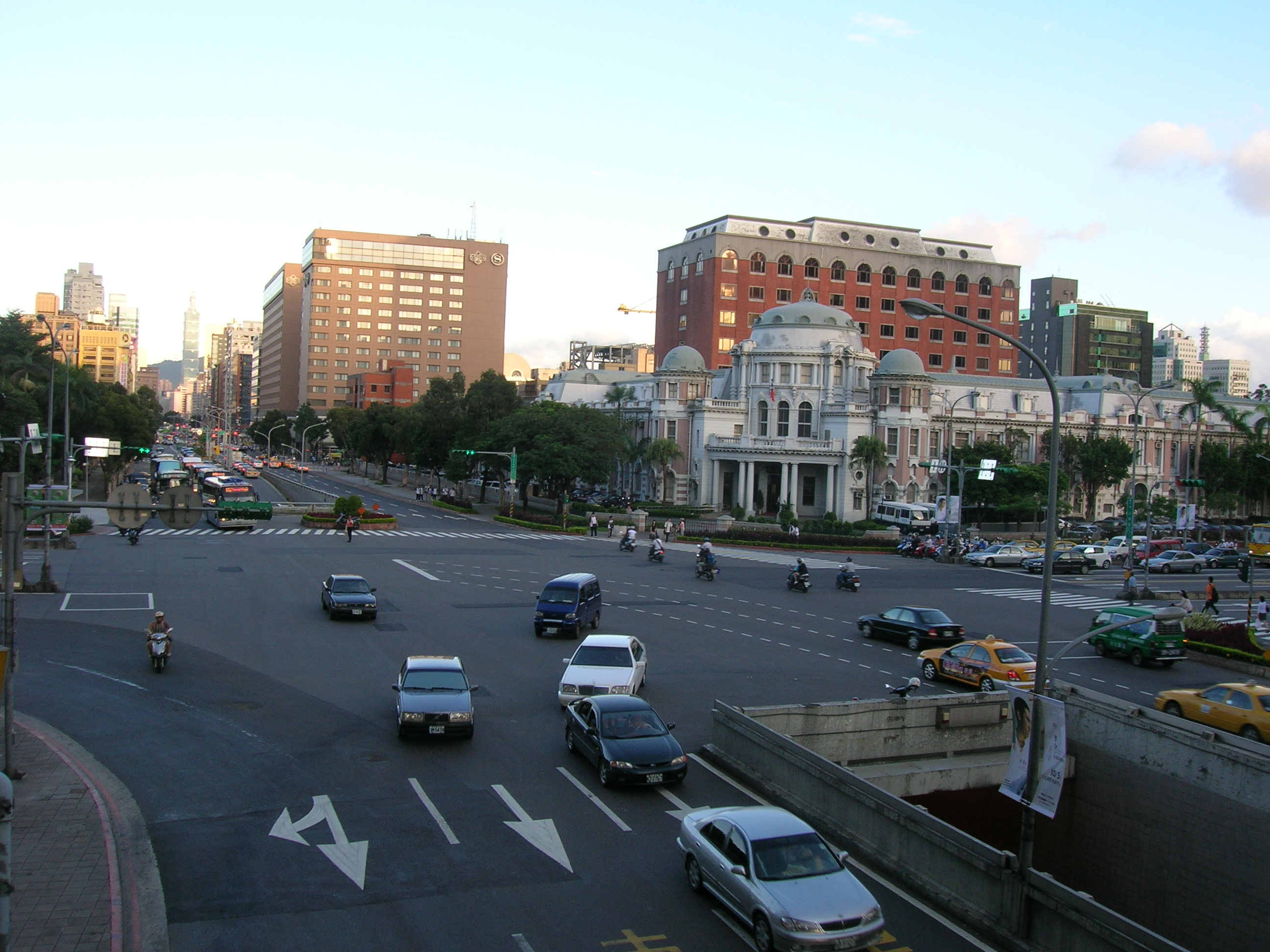
Provincial Highway 5

Provincial Highway 5 (Chinese: 台5線) is a 27.916 km-long provincial Taiwanese highway that connects Taipei and its nearest port Keelung. Before the freeway system was built, this was the primary route for goods transportation. The road is a major avenue (known as Zhongxiao East Road) in Taipei city, and is the north–south divide for the city. It also passes through downtown Xizhi and Keelung.

== Route Description ==
The route begins at the intersection of Highway 1, 1a, 3, and 9 in front of Executive Yuan in Taipei. The highway continues along Zhongxiao East Road (忠孝東路), passing through downtown Taipei, before turning onto Academia Road (研究院路) and Nangang Road (南港路) in Nangang District. The road then exits Taipei where it enters Xizhi in New Taipei City. In Xizhi the road follows Xintaiwu Road (新台五路, literally "New PH 5 Road") heading towards Keelung, bypassing downtown Xizhi. In Keelung the highway passes through the communities of Wudu, Qidu and Badu before reaching the downtown. Once in downtown Keelung, the road runs concurrently with PH 2 until it reaches its terminus at Port of Keelung.

The highway runs parallel to the railroad lines connecting Taipei and Keelung for most of its length.

== Spur routes ==
- Prov 5a: This is the old segment of Highway 5 in Xizhi. The route serves downtown Xizhi while the parent route bypasses it. The new section, now signed as Highway 5, is known as Xin Taiwu (New Highway 5) Road. The total length is 8.623 km. The route was originally signed to the first controlled-access highway of Taiwan, the MacArthur Thruway.

== Historic spur routes ==
- Prov 5b: This 2-km spur connects Highway 5A and National Highway 1, allowing trucks to bypass downtown Xizhi. The road was decommissioned in 2013.

== See also ==
- Highway system in Taiwan
