= Provincial Highway 28 (Taiwan) =

Provincial highway in Taiwan

Provincial Highway 28
- 台28線

Route information
- Maintained by Directorate General of Highways
- Length: 49.657 km (30.855 mi)

Major junctions
- West end: Prov 17 in Hunei
- Nat 1 in Lujhu; Nat 3 in Tianliao
- East end: Prov 27 in Liouguei

Location
- Country: Taiwan

Highway system
- Highway system in Taiwan
← Prov 27	→ Prov 29

Provincial Highway 28 is a Taiwanese highway that starts from Hunei and ends in Liouguei. The highway is entirely located in Kaohsiung City. The route length is 49.657 kilometres (30.855 mi) .

== Route description ==
The highway begins at Hunei at the intersection with Highway 17. The highway heads eastbound and serves as the main highway in Tianliao, Cishan, and Meinong. The road ends at Laonong (荖濃) in Liouguei District at the intersection with Highway 27.

== See also ==
- Highway system in Taiwan
