= South Bay (Taiwan) =

Bay in Hengchun, Pingtung County, Taiwan

South Bay 南灣
- beach
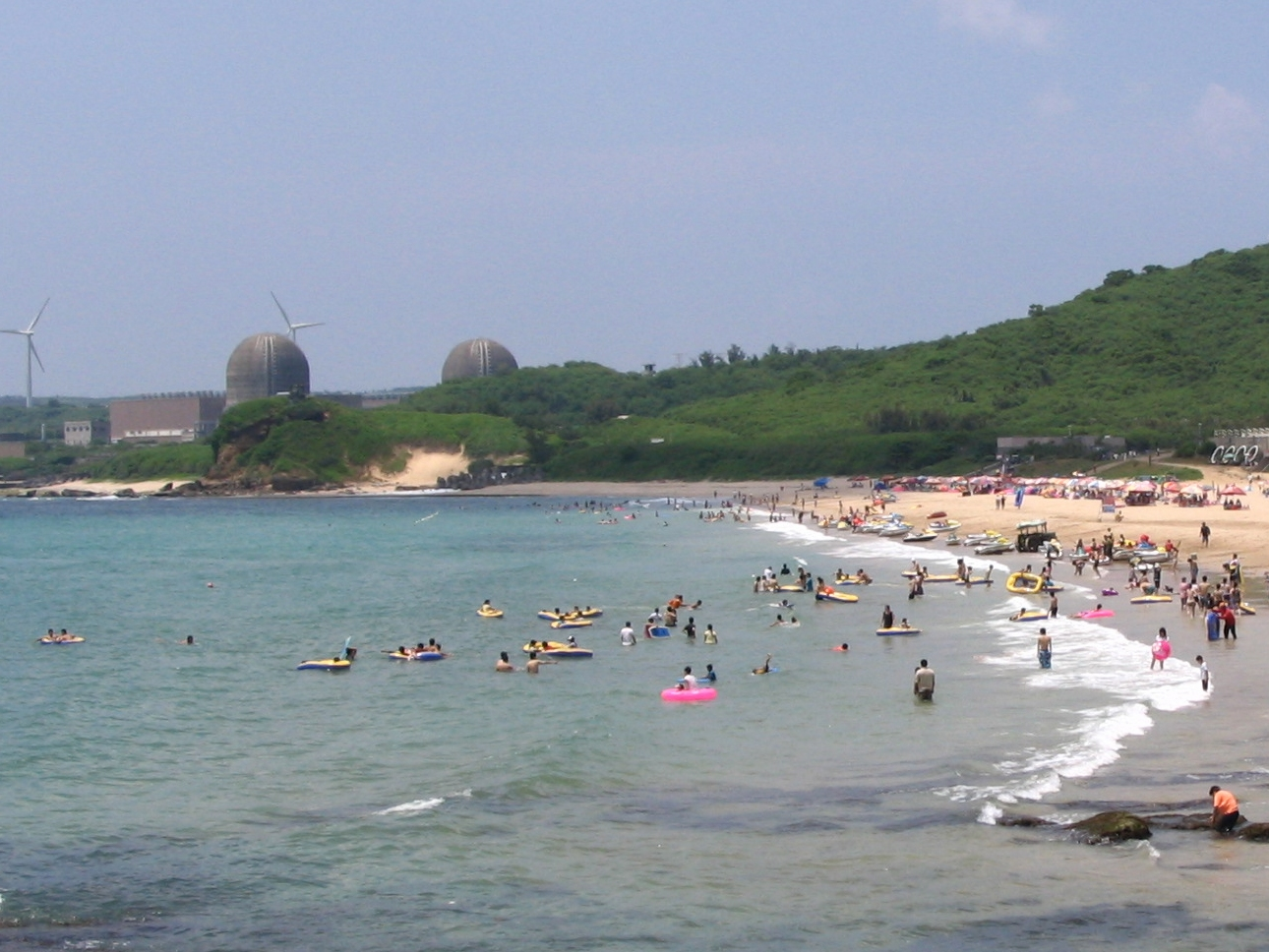

- Location within Pingtung County
- Coordinates: 21°57′33.9″N 120°45′48.7″E
- Location: Hengchun, Pingtung County, Taiwan
- Part of: Kenting National Park

Dimensions
  - Length: 600 m (2,000 ft)
- Access: Kaohsiung Station, Xinzuoying Station

South Bay
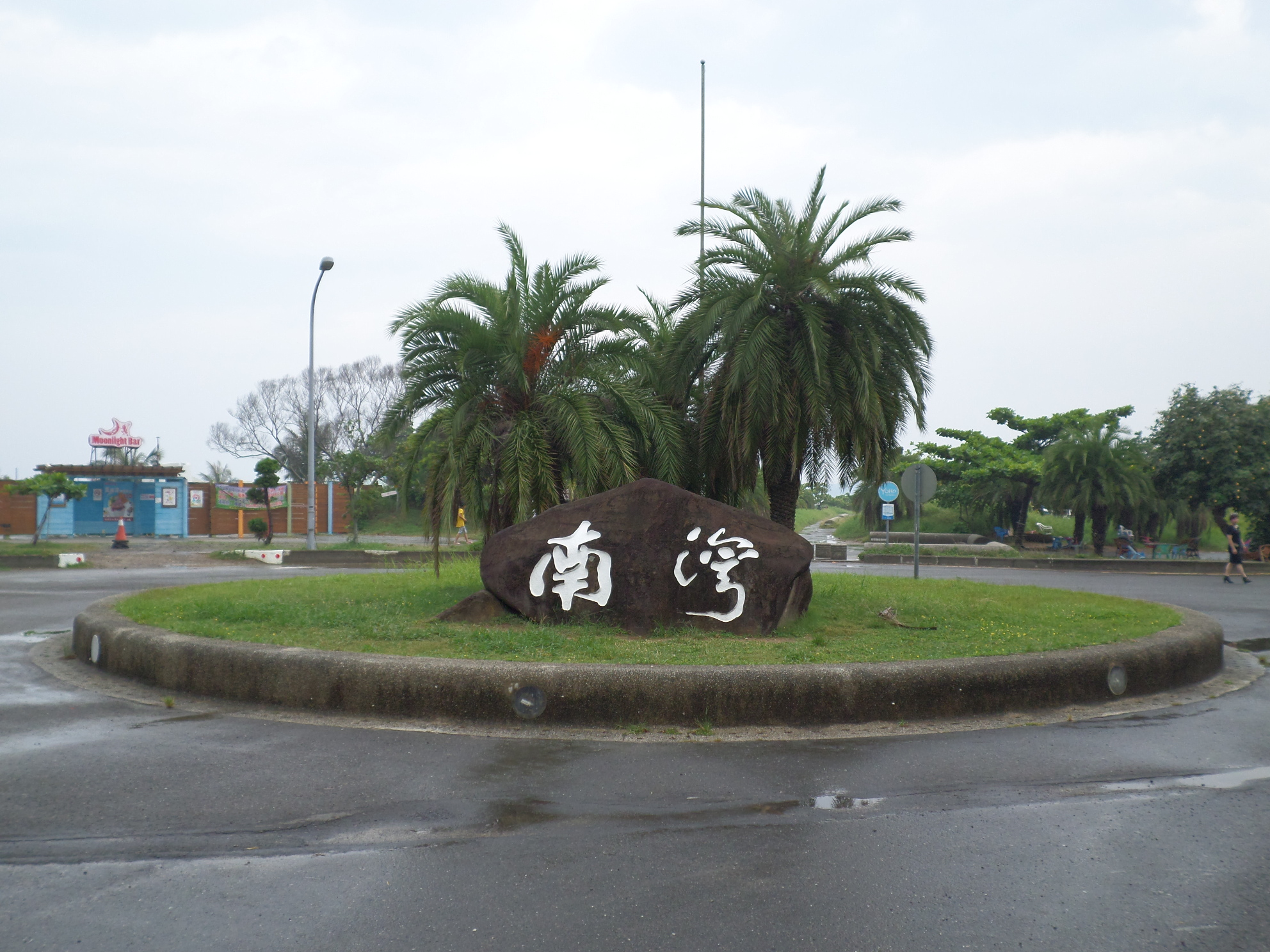
- Entrance gate
- Traditional Chinese: 南灣
- Simplified Chinese: 南湾
- Literal meaning: South Bay
Transcriptions
Standard Mandarin
- Hanyu Pinyin: Nánwān; Nán Wān
- Wade–Giles: Nan-wan; Nan Wan

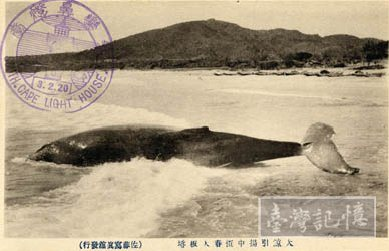
Landed humpback whale near Cape Eluanbi in 1920s

South Bay, also known by other names, is a bay and adjacent beach near Hengchun in Pingtung County, Taiwan. It is part of Kenting National Park.

== Names ==
"South Bay" is a calque of the bay's Mandarin name, written 南灣 in traditional characters or 南湾 in simplified characters. It is also known as the Nanwan, from the Chinese name's pronunciation in Mandarin; as Blue Bay; and as Gualiang or Kwa-liang Bay.

== History ==
The bay used to be a whaling area during the Japanese rule. It is still home to small fishing villages.

== Geography ==
The bay is bound on the west by Cape Maobitou and on the east by Cape Eluanbi. The beach has white sand and a length of around 600 meters (2,000 ft).

== Facilities ==
The area around the beach provides facilities such as changing rooms, toilets, rental and sale of swimming equipment, restaurants and parking. Common activities at the beach and its surrounding areas are swimming, surfing, snorkeling, scuba diving etc.

== Transportation ==
The beach is accessible by bus from Xinzuoying and Kaohsiung Stations, run by the Taiwan Railway.

== See also ==
- List of tourist attractions in Taiwan
