= Provincial Highway 76 (Taiwan) =

Road in Taiwan

Provincial Highway 76
- 台76線
- 芳苑草屯線 (Fangyuan-Caotun Expressway)

Route information
- Maintained by Directorate General of Highways
- Length: 32.644 km (20.284 mi)
- Existed: 25 December 1998–present

Major junctions
- West end: Cty 144 / Prov 19 in Puyan, Changhua
- East end: Nat 3 in Caotun, Nantou

Location
- Country: Taiwan

Highway system
- Highway system in Taiwan
← Prov 74	→ Prov 78

Provincial Highway 76

Provincial Highway 76 (Chinese: 台76線) is an expressway, which begins in the border of Puyan, Changhua and Fuxing, Changhua on Jhangshuei Road (Provincial Highway 19) and ends in Caotun, Nantou on (National Highway No. 3).

== Length ==
The total length is 32.644 km.

== Major Cities Along the Route ==
- Yuanlin, Changhua
- Caotun, Nantou

== Exit List ==
As of 2015, a plan is to extend the expressway from CR 144 in Puyan to Fangyuan.

City	Location	km	Mile	Exit	Name	Destinations	Notes
Changhua County	Puyan	11.4	7.1	11	Puyan	Cty 144 / Prov 19 – Xihu, Puyan, Fuxing, Xiushui	
Changhua County	Puyan	15.3	9.5	15	Puyan System	Nat 1 – Changhua City, Beidou	
Changhua County	Puxin	19.1	11.9	19	Puxin	Cty 144 – Dacun, Puxin	
Changhua County	Yuanlin	22.9	14.2	22	Yuanlin	Prov 1 / Cty 144 – Dacun, Yuanlin, Yongjing, Tianwei	
Changhua County	Yuanlin	26.8	16.7	26	Lincuo	Cty 137 / Cty 144 – Lincuo, Shetou	
Nantou County	Caotun	32.644	20.284	32	Zhongxing System	Nat 3 / Prov 14b – Caotun, Nantou City	
1.000 mi = 1.609 km; 1.000 km = 0.621 mi: Incomplete access

== Intersections with other Freeways and Expressways ==
- National Highway No. 1 at Puyan JCT. in Puyan, Changhua
- National Highway No. 3 at Zhongxing JCT. in Caotun, Nantou

== See also ==
- Highway system in Taiwan

== Notes ==
Baguashan Tunnel between Lincuo IC. and Zhongxing JCT. was the longest highway tunnel (4.9 km) in Taiwan when opened to traffic in April 2005, although the top rank moved to Hsuehshan Tunnel in National Highway No. 5 in June 2006.

The exact route west of the Provincial Highway No. 19 is undetermined. However, there is an alternative route connecting to West Coast Expressway (Provincial Highway No. 61).
