= Cape Maobitou =

Cape in Pingtung County, Taiwan

Cape Maobitou 貓鼻頭
- Cape
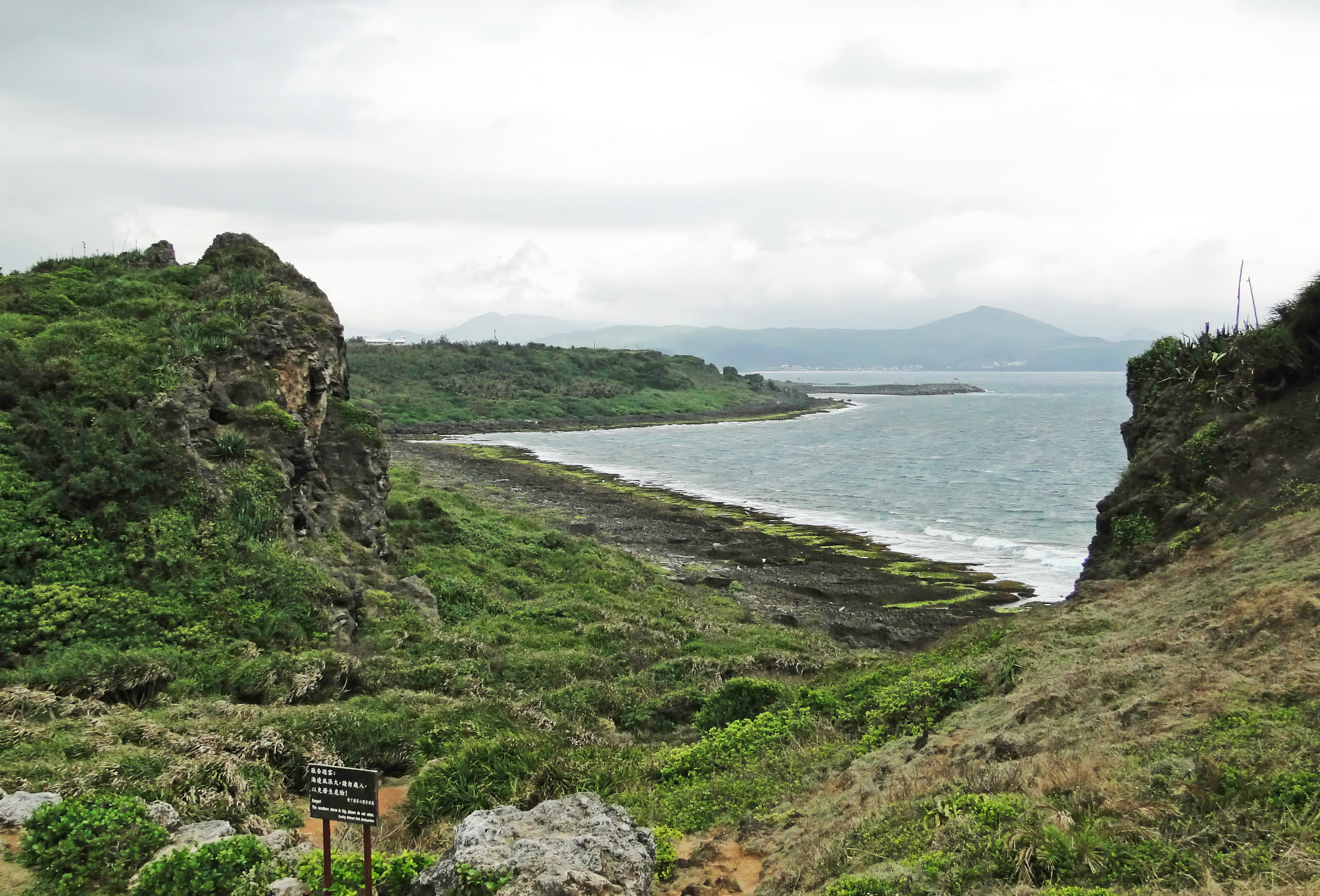
- Cape Maobitou (2011)

- Location in Taiwan
- Coordinates: 21°55′11″N 120°44′22″E
- Location: Hengchun, Pingtung County, Taiwan

Cape Maobitou
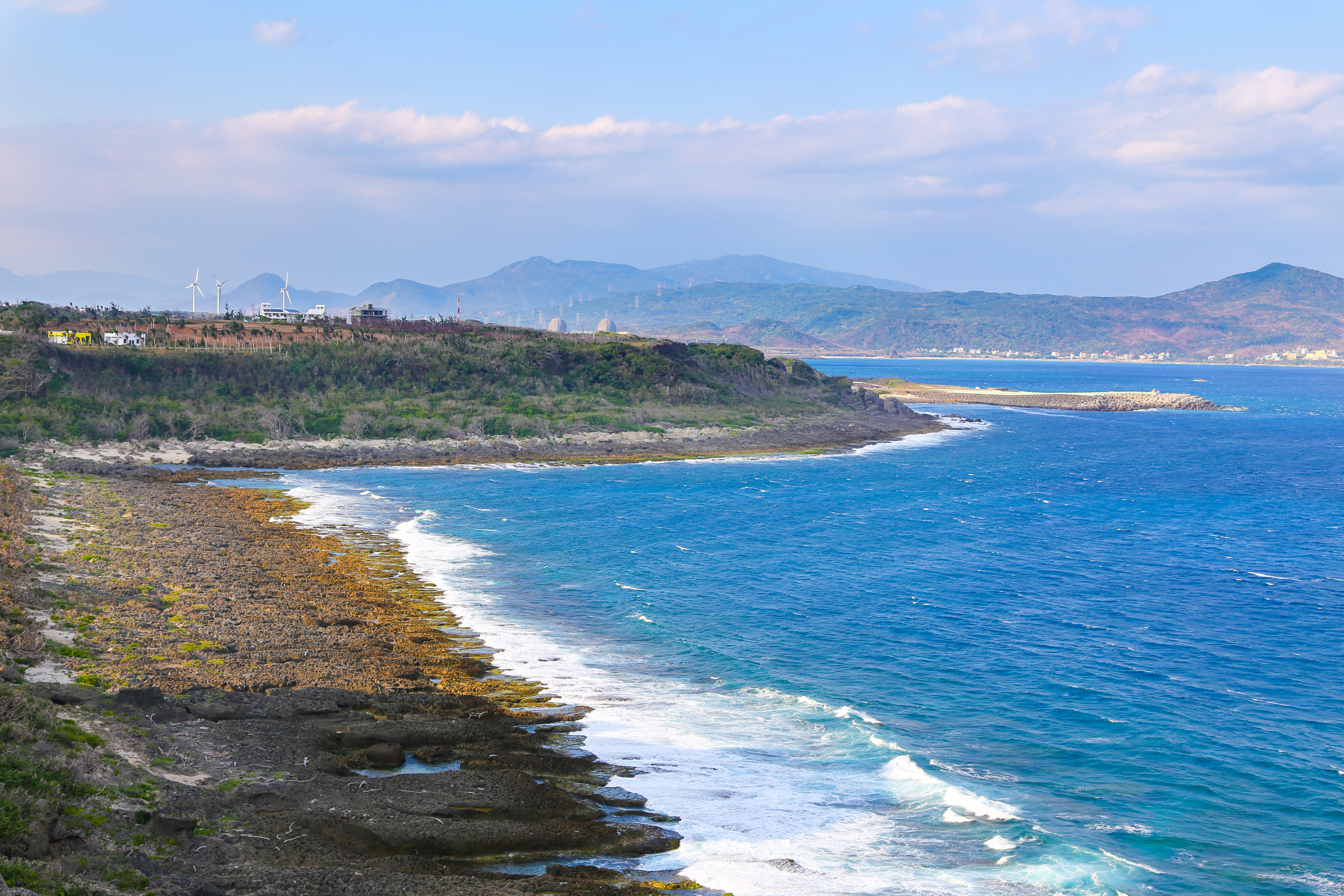
- Maobitou (2017)
- Traditional Chinese: 貓鼻頭
- Simplified Chinese: 猫鼻头
- Literal meaning: Cat's Nose; Cat Cape
Transcriptions
Standard Mandarin
- Hanyu Pinyin: Māobítou
- Wade–Giles: Mao-pi-tou
Southern Min
- Hokkien POJ: Niau-phī-thâu

Former names
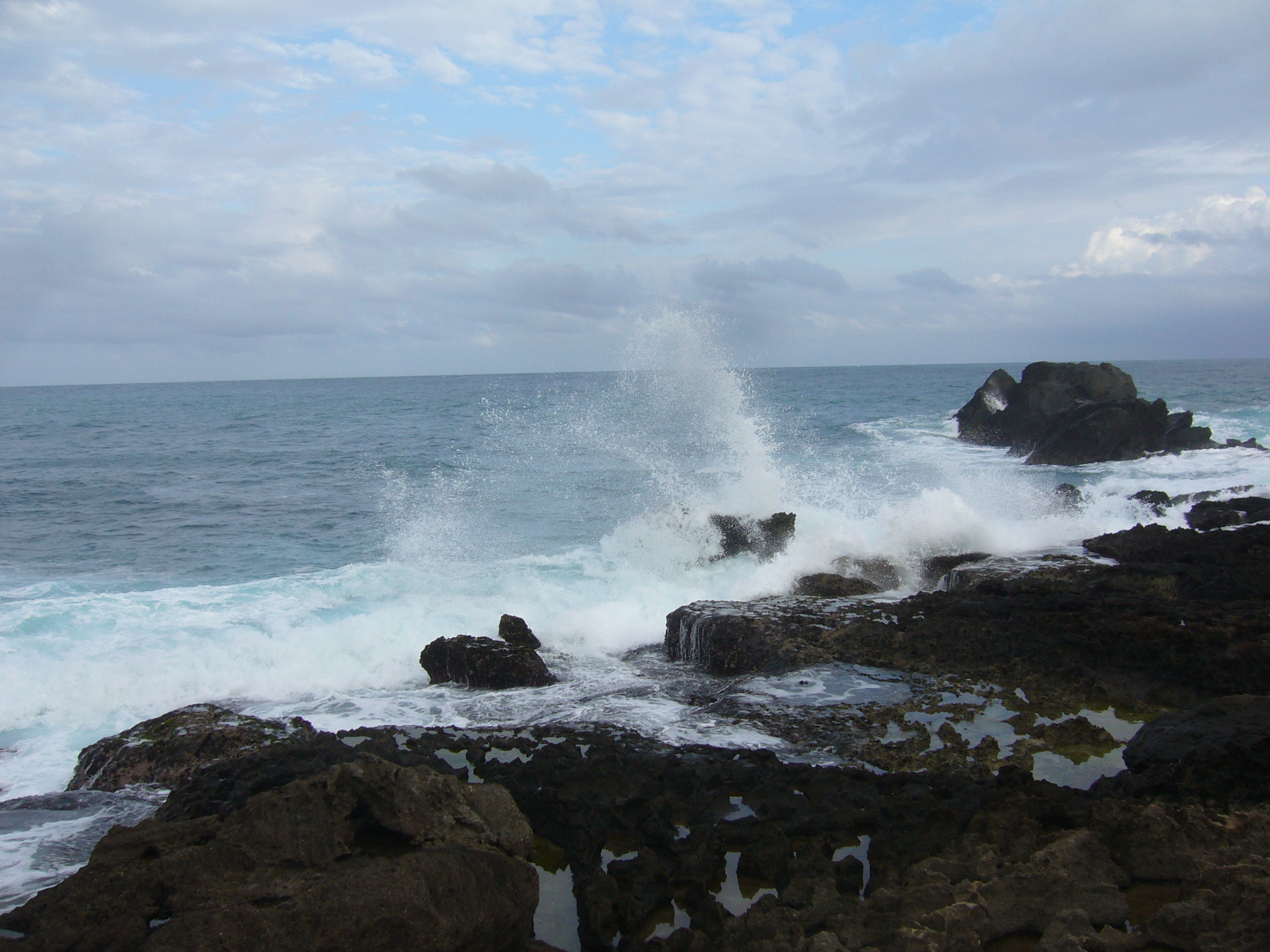
- Waves at Maobitou (2009)

Maobi
- Traditional Chinese: 貓鼻
- Simplified Chinese: 猫鼻
- Literal meaning: Cat's Nose; Cat Cape
Transcriptions
Standard Mandarin
- Hanyu Pinyin: Māobí
- Wade–Giles: Mao-pi
Southern Min
- Hokkien POJ: Niau-phī

Cape Maobitou is a cape in the township of Hengchun in Pingtung County, Taiwan. It lies within Kenting National Park and forms the western boundary of South Bay. It is one of the southernmost points on Taiwan Island, sits opposite to the Cape Eluanbi in the southeast.

== Name ==
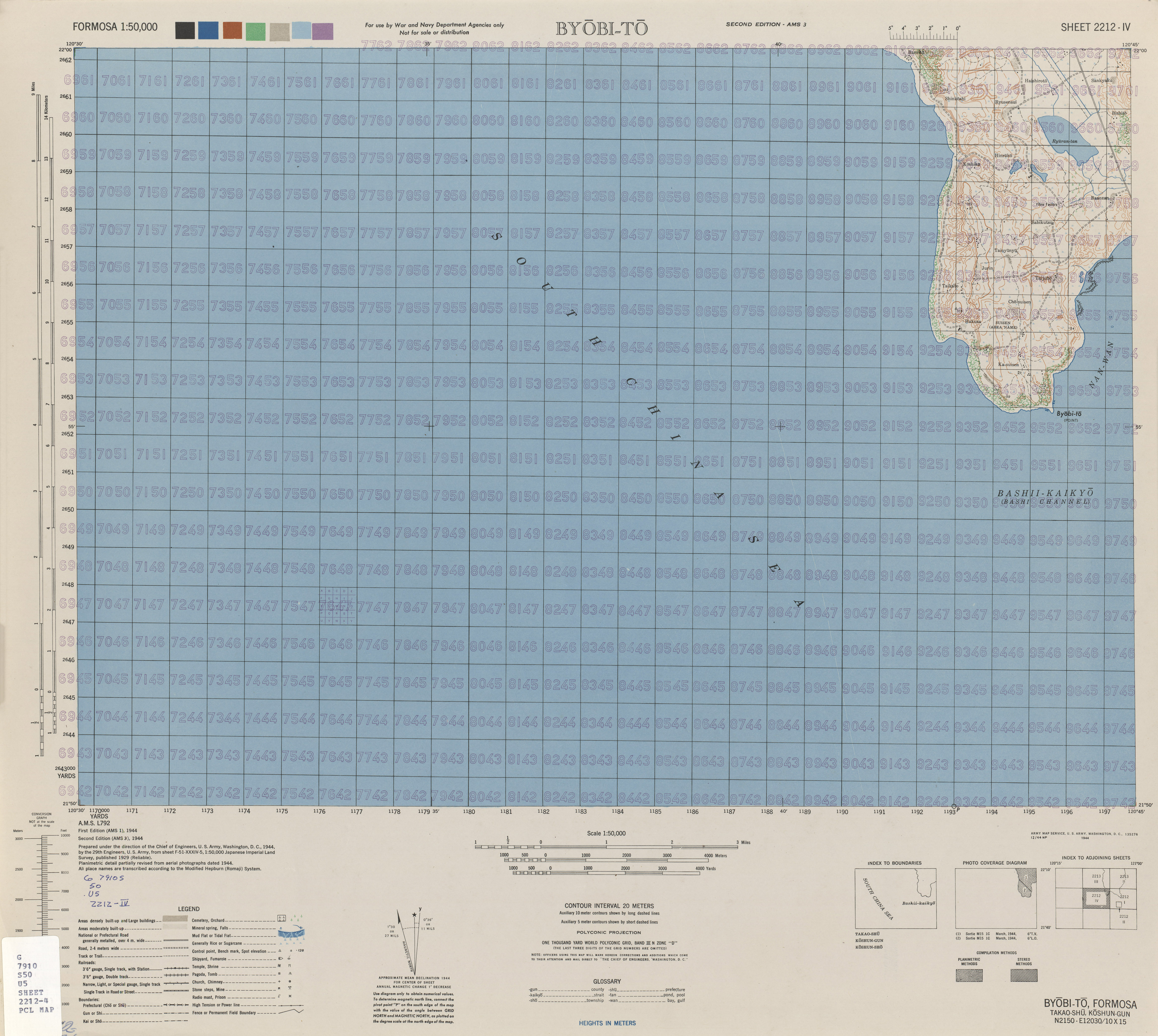
Map including Cape Maobitou (labeled as Byōbi-tō) (1944)

Māobítou is the pinyin romanization of the Mandarin pronunciation of the Chinese name, written 貓鼻頭 in traditional characters and 猫鼻头 in simplified characters. It literally means "Cat Nose Head" but bítou is a simply a clarifying dialectical variation of bí, itself a dialectical name for a headland.

Maobitou or Maobi was formerly known as Niauphi, from the Hokkien form of the name.

== Transportation ==
The cape is located near Taiwan's Highway 26.

== See also ==
- Geography of Taiwan
- Kenting National Park
- Cape Eluanbi
