= Baguashan Tunnel =

Road tunnel in Taiwan

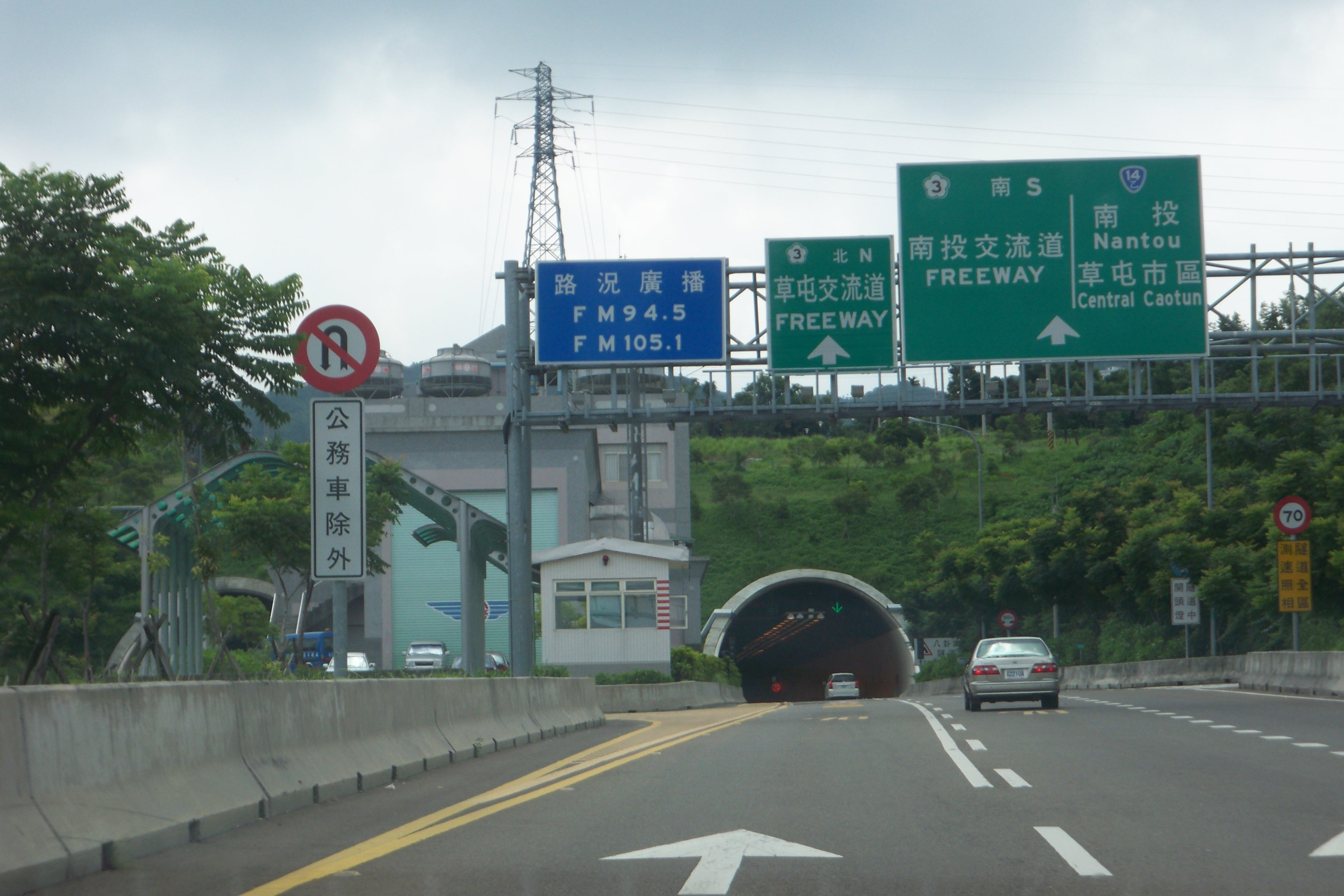
- West entrance of Baguashan Tunnel
- Interactive map of Baguashan Tunnel

Overview
- Official name: 八卦山隧道
- Location: Taiwan
- Coordinates: 23°56′47.278″N 120°37′55.690″E
- Status: Open
- Route: Provincial Highway 76

Operation
- Work began: 15 November 1996
- Opened: 29 April 2005
- Operator: Directorate General of Highways

Technical
- Length: 4,928 m (3.062 mi) (westbound); 4,935 m (3.066 mi) (eastbound)
- No. of lanes: 4
- Operating speed: 80 km/h (50 mph)

The Baguashan Tunnel (Chinese: 八卦山隧道) is the highway tunnel of Provincial Highway No. 76, Taiwan, transversing Baguashan (八卦山) between Lincuo IC. (林厝交流道) and Zhongxing JCT. (中興系統交流道). The length of the north tube for westbound traffic is 4,928 m (3.062 mi). The length of the south tube for eastbound traffic is 4,935 m (3.066 mi). Connecting Yuanlin, Changhua and Caotun, Nantou, its opening significantly reduced the travel time between Changhua and Nantou.

It was the longest highway tunnel in Taiwan when opened to traffic in April 2005, until the top rank moved to Hsuehshan Tunnel in National Highway No. 5 in June 2006. It is now the second longest highway tunnel in Taiwan.

== History ==
- On 15 November 1996, construction started.
- On 5 October 2000, a civil house above the tunnel collapsed and the work stopped for one year.
- On 29 April 2005, the tunnel opened to traffic in the first step. Only small vehicles were allowed. A truck over 3500 kg in gross weights and a bus with 10 or more seats including the driver were prohibited while the authorities were not ready to deal with emergencies involving large vehicles.
- On 5 September 2005, the first vehicular accident occurred. The supposedly drunk driver hit the sidewall in the tunnel and caused a vehicular fire.
- On 1 January 2006, the tunnel opened to buses.
- On 1 January 2007, the tunnel opened to trucks less than 21 tons in gross weights.

== Related information ==
- Lanes: The tunnel has two lanes in each of the two tubes.
- Speed limit: 80 km/h
- Constructing authority: Directorate General of Highways (公路總局)
- Maintaining authority: Directorate General of Highways
- Traffic opening has been step by step. It is now the third step.

The first step allowed small vehicles on 29 April 2005.
The second step allowed buses on 1 January 2006.
The third step allowed heavy trucks on 1 January 2007. But vehicles with hazardous materials or being too long, too wide, too high, or too heavy (more than 21 tons in gross weights, including combination vehicles like full-trailers and semi-trailers) are still remain banned.

== See also ==
- Provincial Highway No. 76 (Taiwan)
