= Electronic Toll Collection (Taiwan) =

Toll collection system in Taiwan

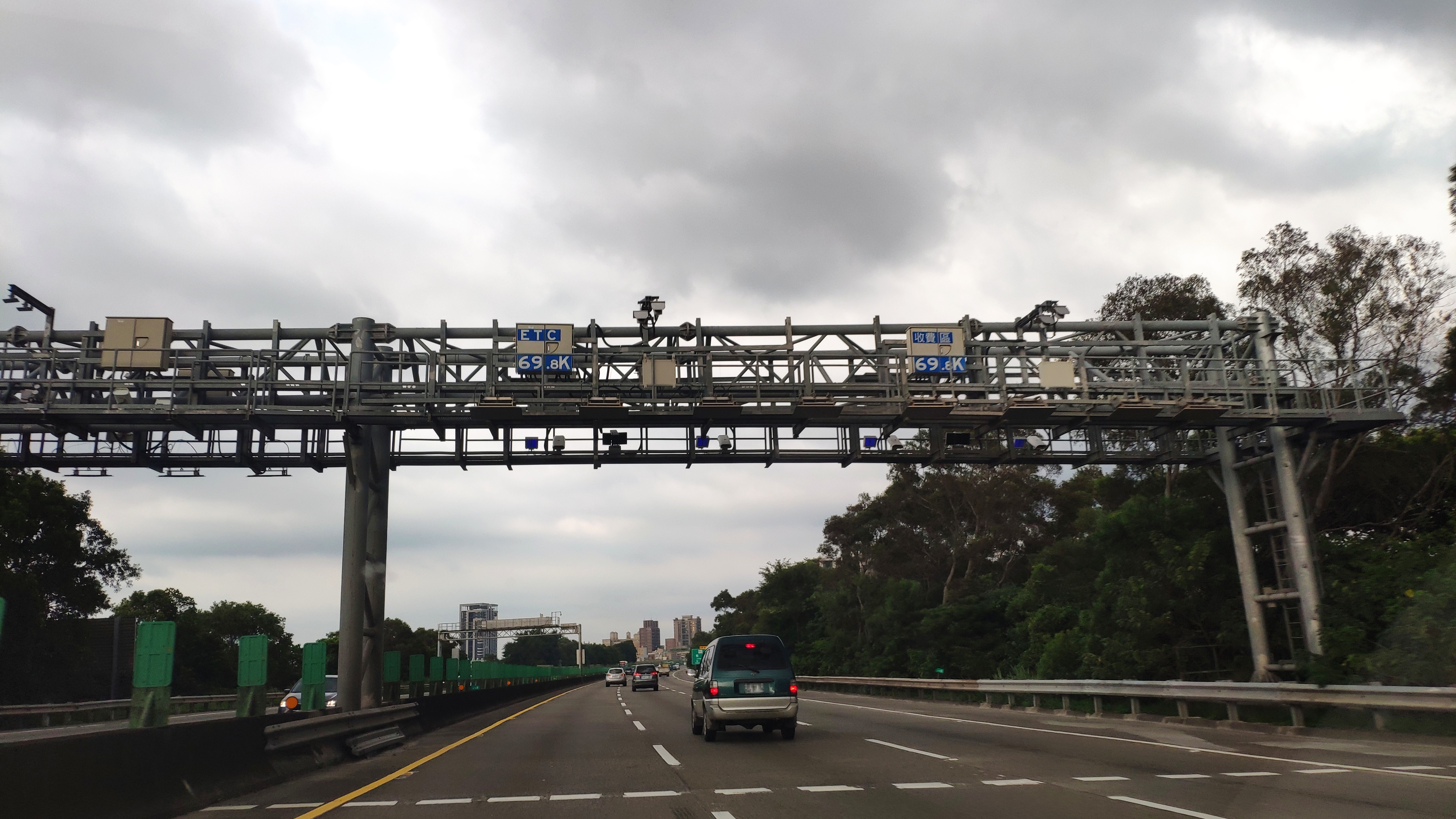
Toll gate

The Taiwan Highway Electronic Toll Collection System (ETC; Chinese: 高速公路電子收費系統; pinyin: Gāosù Gōnglù Diànzǐ Shōufèi Xìtǒng) is used to electronically collect tolls on national freeways in Taiwan (Note: This term "freeway" mean "free of signal", not "free of charge"). All tolls are collected electronically by overhead gantries with multi-lane free flow, not at traditional toll booths. Taiwan was the first country to switch from manual tolling to all-electronic, multi-lane free-flow tolling on all of its freeways.

To simulate the previous model, where a vehicle would not pass toll collection over short-distance travel, each vehicle receives 20 kilometers per diem of free travel and is billed NT$1.2 per kilometer thereafter. Buses and trailers are subject to heavy vehicle surcharges. The highway administration may alter fares (e.g. remove the per diem) during peak travel seasons to facilitate distribution of congestion to midnight hours.

The toll gates divide the highway into segments, each having a price value determined by distance to the next gate (interchange). A daily gate count is calculated at midnight, and the total charge is deducted in 48 hours. Each vehicle receives a further discount after the first 200 kilometers, and eTag subscribers with prepaid accounts get a further 10% reduction. Non-subscribers are billed by license plate recognition and mail statements, or can make a payment at chain convenient store at third day after vehicle travel, since a subscription to ETC is not mandated by law.

Freeway users passing through the section of previous toll stations no longer need to slow down. The driving time and areas of traffic congestion are reduced while the overall vehicle flow is improved significantly. Statistics shows that one way journey from Taipei to Kaohsiung (about 350 kilometers) can now save at least 10 minutes in average or nearly 20 minutes during off-peak hours.

Taiwan was the first country to transfer from flat-rate toll stations to a distance-based pay-as-you-go tolling system on all of its freeways. It has the longest ETC freeway mileage in the world.

Tolls are located on all odd numbered national freeways, 1, 3, 5 and 3A. (Note: native name is "國道三號甲線", a short spur connecting downtown Taipei and Shenkeng)

== History ==
The first toll station was built in Taishan on Freeway 1 with manual toll collecting in July 1974. Manual toll collection lasted until the end of 2003, at which point there were 23 toll stations on eight national freeways, with an average distance of 35 kilometres (22 mi) between toll stations. Each toll station had 5–11 toll gates in each direction, and a flat rate was charged between toll stations.

Exact-change toll gates were introduced in February 1983, and toll gates that accepted toll tickets were introduced in December 1996. In February 2005, ETC gates at toll stations were launched.

In December 2013, the old toll stations were replaced by distance-based pay-as-you-go all-electronic toll collection on all of Taiwan's major freeways.
