= Provincial Highway 29 (Taiwan) =

Provincial highway in Taiwan

Provincial Highway 29
- 台29線
- Dalin Highway

Route information
- Maintained by Directorate General of Highways
- Length: 112.26 km (69.76 mi)

Major junctions
- North end: Namasia, Kaohsiung City
- Nat 10 in Cishan
- South end: Prov 17 in Linyuan

Location
- Country: Taiwan

Highway system
- Highway system in Taiwan
← Prov 28	→ Prov 30

Provincial Highway 29 is a Taiwanese highway that starts from Namasia and ends in Linyuan. The highway is entirely located in Kaohsiung City. The highway was once the southern segment of Highway 21 until 2014, when it was assigned the current number. The highway is known as Dalin Highway (達林公路) for its entire length. For the segment between Jiaxian and Cishan the highway is known as Qijia Highway (旗甲公路). The route length is 112.26 kilometres (69.76 mi) .

== Route description ==
The highway begins at the mountainous aboriginal district of Namasia. The highway heads southbound as it leaves for the plains, passing through the rural and suburban districts of Jiaxian, Shanlin, Cishan, Dashu, before entering the industrial districts of Daliao and Linyuan. The road ends at Linyuan District at the intersection with Highway 17.

== See also ==
- Highway system in Taiwan
