= Provincial Highway 68 (Taiwan) =

Road in Taiwan

Provincial Highway 68
- 台68線
- 東西向快速公路——南寮竹東線 (East-West Expressway, Nanliao-Zhudong Line)

Route information
- Maintained by Directorate General of Highways
- Length: 22.992 km (14.287 mi)
- Existed: November 1998–present

Major junctions
- West end: Prov 15 in North District, Hsinchu City
- East end: Prov 3 in Zhudong, Hsinchu County

Location
- Country: Taiwan

Highway system
- Highway system in Taiwan
← Prov 66	→ Prov 72

Provincial Highway 68

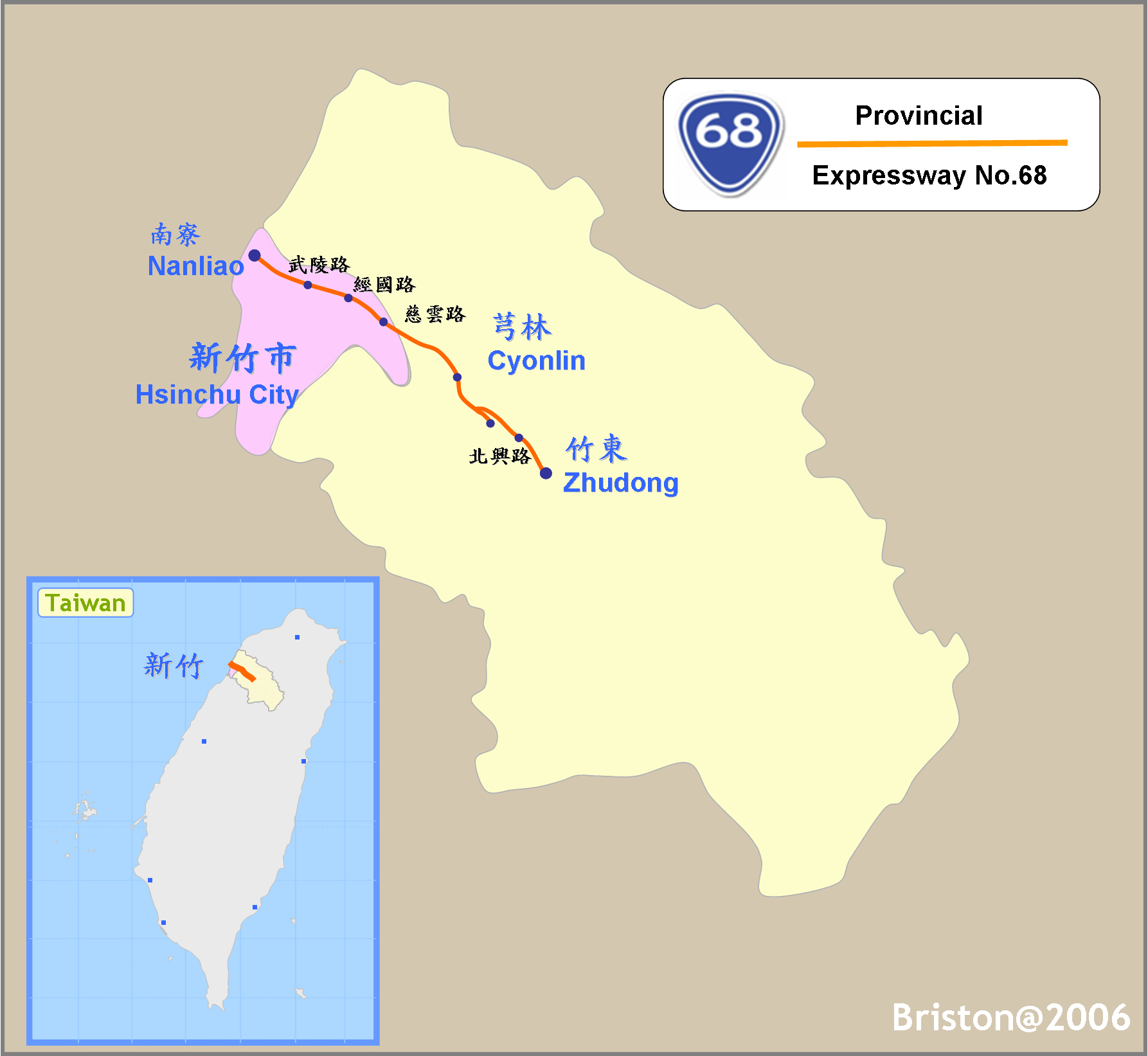
Map

Provincial Highway 68 (Chinese: 台68線) is an expressway, which begins in Hsinchu City at Nanliao on the Provincial Highway No. 15 and ends in Zhudong on Zhongfeng Road (Provincial Road No. 3).

== Route Description ==
Provincial Highway 68 begins at the Nanliao Harbor in the North District and passes through the northern parts of Hsinchu City while running in a south-easterly direction. It then passes through Qionglin, where a bridge can be used to reach Freeway 3. The route eventually ends at an intersection with Provincial Highway 3 in Zhudong.

== Length ==
The total length is 22.992 km (14.287 mi).

== Exit list ==
City	Location	km	Mile	Exit	Name	Destinations	Notes
Hsinchu City	North District	1.1	0.68	1	Nanliao	Prov 15	Westbound exit and eastbound entrance
Hsinchu City	North District	5.0	3.1	5	Hsinchu 1	Wuling Rd.	
Hsinchu City	East District	7.5	4.7	7	Hsinchu 2	Prov 1 – Zhubei, Hsinchu City	
Hsinchu City	East District	9.7	6.0	9	Zhuke	Cty 117 – Zhubei, Hsinchu Science and Industrial Park	
Hsinchu County	Qionglin	15.8	9.8	15	Qionglin	To Cty 115 / Cty 120 / Cty 122 – Qionglin, Erchongpu	
Hsinchu County	Zhudong	18.7	11.6	18	Zhudong 1	Prov 68a – Zhudong	Left eastbound exit and westbound entrance
Hsinchu County	Zhudong	20	12	20	Zhudong 2	Central Zhudong	Eastbound exit and westbound entrance
Hsinchu County	Zhudong	22.992	14.287	23		Prov 3 – Hengshan, Beipu	
1.000 mi = 1.609 km; 1.000 km = 0.621 mi: Incomplete access

== Major Cities Along the Route ==
- Hsinchu City
- Zhubei City

== Intersections with other Freeways and Expressways ==
No direct connections. However, Zhubei IC. of National Highway No. 1 and Zhulin IC. of National Highway No. 3 are not far away from this expressway.

== Branch lines ==
The branch line (No. 68A) connects Zhaoyang Road (County Highway No. 123) in Zhudong, Hsinchu.

== See also ==
- Highway system in Taiwan

== Notes ==
The first section (Hsinchu Science Park IC. - Qionglin IC.) completed in 1999.

A trial program to allow a motorcycle with a cylinder capacity of more than 250 cm^{3} or with an electric power of more than 40 horsepowers was started in January 2005 for one year. This trial program was extended for one year.
