= Provincial Highway 26 (Taiwan) =

Provincial highway in Taiwan

Provincial Highway 26
- 台26線
- Ping-E Highway

Route information
- Maintained by Directorate General of Highways
- Length: 93.5 km (58.1 mi)

Major junctions
- West end: Prov 9 in Fangshan, Pingtung
- East end: Prov 9 in Daren, Taitung

Location
- Country: Taiwan

Highway system
- Highway system in Taiwan
← Prov 25	→ Prov 27

Provincial Highway 26 is a Taiwanese highway that starts from Fangshan, Pingtung County and ends in Daren, Taitung County, with two gaps in the route. The highway is also known as Ping-E Highway (屏鵝公路) for the stretch between Fangshan and Cape Eluanbi in Kenting National Park, and Jia-E Highway (佳鵝公路) between Cape Eluanbi and Jialeshui (佳樂水). It is the primary highway to Kenting National Park and the beaches in Kenting. The route length is 93.5 kilometres (58.1 mi).

== Route description ==
The highway begins at Fenggang (楓港), a village in Fangshan, at the intersection with Highway 9. Although signed as an east–west highway, the highway actually turns southbound towards Kenting National Park, passing through the terminus of Highway 1, which provides access to the major cities in western Taiwan. After passing through Shizi and Checheng, the highway enters Hengchun Township, home to Kenting National Park. The highway passes through most of the tourist destination in the park, including Main Street Kenting (墾丁大街), Kenting beach, Cape Maobitou, Cape Eluanbi, among others. After reaching Cape Eluanbi, the highway turns northbound and head towards Jialeshui on the east side of the park.

The highway has a gap between Jialeshui and Gangzai (港仔) in Manzhou Township. The section is unbuilt due to environmental concerns. Instead, drivers will need to take County Route 200A in Gangzai, which connects to County Route 200, to continue along Highway 26. The highway continues as a 1-lane highway from Gangzai to Xuhai (旭海) in Manzhou Township, before it reaches another unbuilt gap from Xuhai to Xianantian (下南田) in Daren Township, Taitung. This section, if built, will follow Alangyi Ancient Trail (阿朗壹古道), although environmental concerns terminated the construction of this section. To bypass the gap, drivers will need to take County Route 199A in Xuhai, which connects to County Route 199 and Provincial Highway 9. The stretch of the highway from Xianantian to its terminus at Anshuo (安朔), Daren Township, is open to traffic.

== See also ==
- Highway system in Taiwan
