= Provincial Highway 27 (Taiwan) =

Provincial highway in Taiwan

Provincial Highway 27
- 台27線

Route information
- Maintained by Directorate General of Highways
- Length: 79.174 km (49.196 mi)
- Existed: 1992–present

Major junctions
- North end: Prov 20 in Liouguei
- Nat 3 in Changzhi, Pingtung
- South end: Prov 17 in Xinyuan, Pingtung

Location
- Country: Taiwan

Highway system
- Highway system in Taiwan
← Prov 26	→ Prov 28

Provincial Highway 27 is a Taiwanese highway that starts from Liouguei, Kaohsiung City and ends in Xinyuan, Pingtung, Pingtung County. The highway connects the inland townships in Kaohsiung and Pingtung to the southern coasts of Taiwan. The route length is 79.174 kilometres (49.196 mi) .

== History ==
The highway was opened in 1992.

== Route description ==
The highway begins at Laonong (荖濃) in Liouguei District, Kaohsiung, at the intersection with Highway 20. The highway continues along Laonong Creek and enters Pingtung County, passing through Gaoshu, Yanpu, and Changzhi. The road then enters downtown Pingtung City, before heading to the coastal regions. After passing through Wandan, the road ends at Xinyuan at the intersection with Highway 17.

== Spur route ==
Provincial Highway 27a highway splits from its parent route in Liouguei, connecting the western settlements of Laonong Creek, before ending at Highway 28. The total length is 14.121 kilometres (8.774 mi).

== See also ==
- Highway system in Taiwan
