= Provincial Highway 24 (Taiwan) =

Provincial highway in Taiwan

Provincial Highway 24
- 台24線
- Wutai Highway

Route information
- Maintained by Directorate General of Highways
- Length: 47.474 km (29.499 mi)

Major junctions
- West end: Prov 3 in Pingtung City
- Nat 3 in Changzhi
- East end: Wutai, Pingtung

Location
- Country: Taiwan

Highway system
- Highway system in Taiwan
← Prov 23	→ Prov 25

Provincial Highway 24 is a Taiwanese highway that started from Pingtung City and ended in Wutai. The entire highway is within Pingtung County. The highway is also known as Wutai Highway (霧台公路). The route length is 47.474 kilometres (29.499 mi) and connects the population centers in Pingtung to the mountainous aboriginal townships of Sandimen and Wutai.

== Route description ==
The highway begins at downtown Pingtung City at the intersection with Highway 3. The highway continues eastbound towards Changzhi, where it meets Freeway 3. The road continues toward the mountains, passing through Yanpu, Neipu, Sandimen, and ends at Wutai. A stretch of the highway in Wutai was severely damaged by Typhoon Morakot in 2009 and was closed to traffic ever since.

The highway was known as Highway 22 until 1993, when it was assigned its current number. The initial plan was to extend the highway from Wutai to Chihpen in Beinan, Taitung, but was formally abandoned in 2011 due to environmental concerns.

== See also ==
- Highway system in Taiwan
