= MacArthur Thruway =

Historic highway in Taiwan

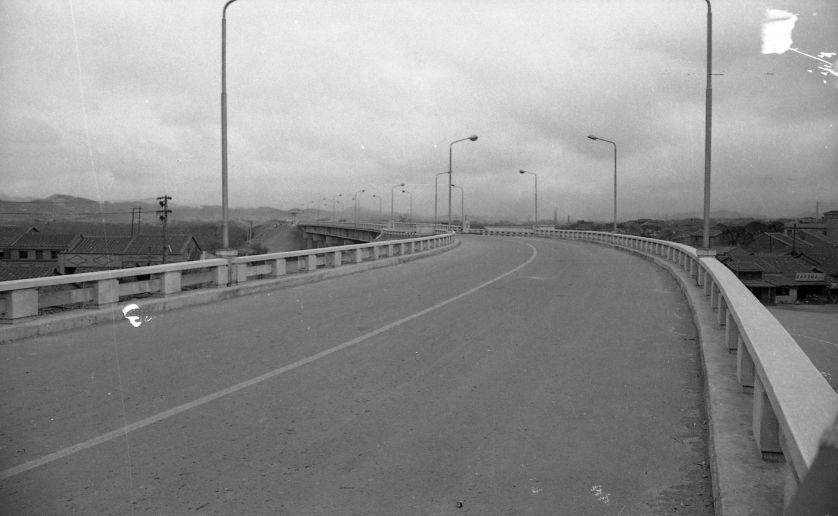

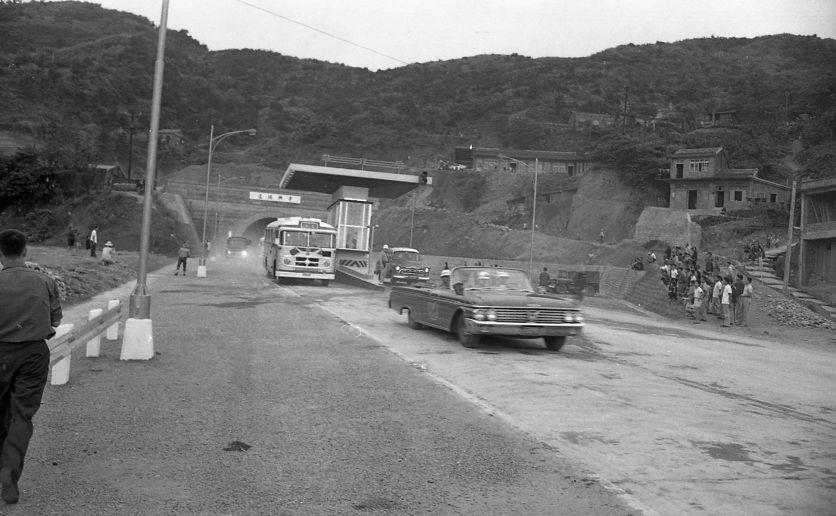

MacArthur Thruway (Chinese: 麥克阿瑟公路; pinyin: Màikèāsè Gōnglù; shortened to 麥帥公路; Mài Shuài Gōnglù), was the first controlled-access highway in Taiwan, linking Taipei to Keelung from 1964 to 1977. It was a predecessor to the Taiwan's National Highway System.

== Route ==
Starting in Taipei at what is now Taipei Gymnasium, the MacArthur Thruway headed east along Nanjing East Road, intersected with Keelung Road at Zhengqi Bridge, and crossed the Keelung River. From there, it went through Neihu, Xizhi, and Qidu, ending in Keelung at the intersection of Xiao 2nd Road (孝二路) and Zhong 4th Road (忠四路). The length was 23 kilometres (14 mi). To handle the heavy traffic between Taipei and Keelung, the road was designed as a controlled-access highway, with 32 bridges, 12 interchanges, and one tunnel called the Zhongxing Tunnel. The tolls for using the road were NT$10 for large vehicles, NT$5 for small vehicles, and NT$1 for military vehicles. Tricycles, motorcycles, and bicycles were prohibited. Originally the speed limits were set to 80 km/h for flat sections and 60 km/h for hilly sections, but this was soon changed to 100 km/h and 80 km/h, respectively.

== History ==
Construction of the MacArthur Thruway began in May 1962, took two years, and cost NT$260 million, including aid from the United States. The road opened on May 2, 1964. Originally, it was to be named Beiji 2nd Road (Chinese: 北基二路; lit. '2nd Taipei–Keelung Road'), and it was later renamed Beiji Xin Road (Chinese: 北基新路; lit. 'New Taipei–Keelung Road'). After General Douglas MacArthur died a month before the road opened, the road was renamed in his honor.

Unfortunately, the road was plagued with accidents. It was less than 8 metres (26 ft) wide, with only one lane in each direction. There was no median to separate oncoming traffic, nor were there barriers along the side of the road. Traffic safety was not a well developed concept. Finally, the quality of the construction was poor. These factors led to a total of 51 accidents and casualties of 273 people within the first two years of the road's opening. The 1979 opening of National Freeway 1 superseded most of the MacArthur Thruway.

The primary remaining section is from the MacArthur 1st Bridge to the Neihu Interchange of National Freeway 1, about 2 kilometres (1.2 mi) long. In 1980, it was renamed Section 6, Nanjing East Road. It was later rebuilt as an elevated expressway named Huandong Boulevard in 2001. The frontage road along this section was also renamed to Section 6, Nanjing East Road in 2009.

The other remaining sections are parts of Kangning Street in Xizhi District, New Taipei and Lane 253, Shijian Road in Qidu District, Keelung. In 2019–20, two bridges on the latter road were rebuilt due to their condition and narrow width.
