= Puyan, Changhua =

Rural township in Changhua County, Taiwan

Coordinates: 23°59′46″N 120°27′42.5″E

Puyan Township 埔鹽鄉
- Rural township
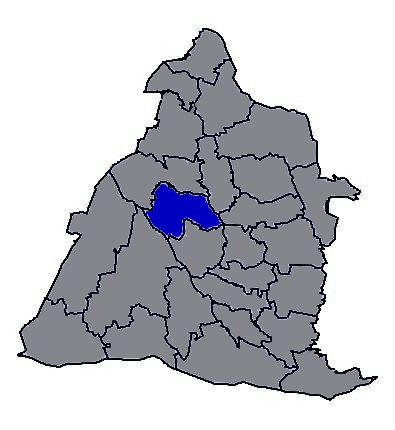
- Puyan Township in Changhua County
- Location: Changhua County, Taiwan

Area
  - Total: 39 km^{2} (15 sq mi)

Population (January 2023)
  - Total: 31,380
  - Density: 800/km^{2} (2,100/sq mi)

Puyan Township (Chinese: 埔鹽鄉; pinyin: Pǔyán Xiāng) is a rural township in Changhua County, Taiwan.

== History ==
Puyan used to be a barren plain inhabited by the Babuza people dwellers who arrived from Quanzhou, Fujian around 300 years ago.

== Geography ==
The township has an area of 38.61 km^{2} consisting of 22 villages, 262 neighborhoods and 8,452 households with a total population of 31,380 people. Around 87.8% of its total area is arable land. The township is located in central Changhua County.

== Administrative divisions ==
The township comprises 22 villages: Buzi, Chushui, Dalian, Dayou, Fengze, Haoxiu, Jiaoshu, Kunlun, Nangang, Nanxin, Punan, Puyan, Sanxing, Shibei, Taiping, Tiancheng, Wayao, Xihu, Xinxing, Xinshui, Yongle and Yongping.

== Economy ==
Vegetable and glutinous rice planting are the main plantation in the township. Its milled long-grain glutinous rice accounts for 27% of the total production in Taiwan. Other produces are broccoli, leeks, spring onions, peas, cucumbers, bitter gourds, squashes and water chestnuts. Its livestock industry is also quite developed, in which most of the livestock are pigs and chickens, with additional cattle, sheep, deer and rabbits.

Commercial business is dominated by traditional shops. Small and medium enterprises or family-owned business operate in the production of parts and components of bikes, plywood, plastic processing or original equipment manufacturer.

== Tourist attractions ==
- Chang Sheng Echeveria Peacockii Farm
- Cisinglun and Rihyue Pool
- Lushan Taoist Temple
- Puyan Shunze Temple
- Tian Jhuang Echeveria Peacockii Farm

== Transportation ==
Puyan System Interchange, spider web of freeway no. 1 and expressway no. 76.
