= Agongdian =

Agongdian may refer to:

- Agongdian Reservoir, a reservoir in Taiwan
- Agongdian River, a river in Taiwan
- Agongdian Solar PV Park, a floating solar photovoltaic park situated on Agongdian Reservoir
