= Alian District =

District in Kaohsiung, Taiwan

Alian 阿蓮區 Alien
- District
- Alian District
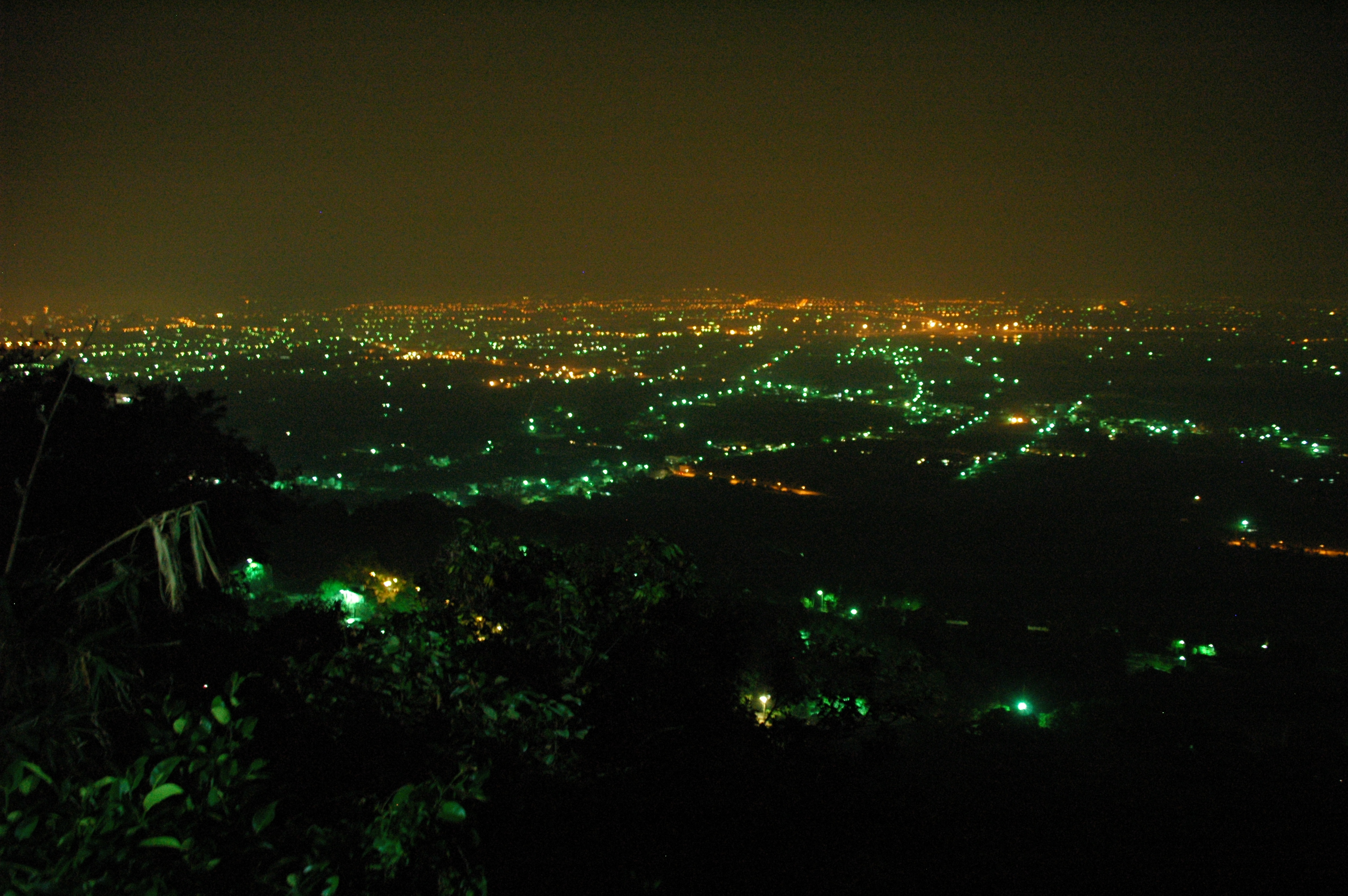
- Night view of Alian District from Dagang Mountain

- Location in Taiwan
- Coordinates: 22°53′N 120°20′E
- Country: Republic of China (Taiwan)
- Special municipality: Kaohsiung

Population (October 2023)
  - Total: 27,450
- Time zone: +8
- Website: alian-en.kcg.gov.tw

Alian District (Chinese: 阿蓮區; pinyin: Ālián Qū; Wade–Giles: A^{1}-lien^{2} Ch'ü^{1}; Pe̍h-ōe-jī: A-lian-khu) is a rural district in Kaohsiung, Taiwan.

== History ==
After the handover of Taiwan from Japan to the Republic of China in 1945, Alian was organized as a rural township of Kaohsiung County. On December 25, 2010, Kaohsiung County was merged with Kaohsiung City and Alian was upgraded to a district of the city.

== Geography ==
The district is located at the northeast of the Kaohsiung Plain on the north end of western Kaohsiung City, between the Erren River and the Agongdian River.

== Administrative divisions ==
The district consists of Shian, Zhonglu, Fengshan, Ganghou, Gangshan, Alian, Qinglian, Helian, Jingqi, Fuan, Yuku and Nanlian Village.

== Tourist attractions ==
- Chaofeng Temple (大崗山超峰寺)
- Dagang Mountain Scenic Area
- Erren River
- Guander Temple (光德寺)
- Lianfeng Temple (大崗山蓮峰寺)

== Transportation ==
The district is connected to Tainan's Xinhua District through Provincial Highway 39, to Luzhu and Tianliao through Provincial Highway 28, and to Guanmiao, Tainan and Gangshan through Provincial Highway 19A.

== Notable natives ==
- Ho Ming-tsan, football player

== See also ==
- Kaohsiung
