= Soya-Mixed Meat Museum =

Museum in Gangshan, Kaohsiung, Taiwan

- 臺灣滷味博物館
- Location: Gangshan, Kaohsiung, Taiwan
- Coordinates: 22°49′03.4″N 120°16′02.0″E
- Type: food museum
- Founder: D.E. Chung Hua Foods Co. Ltd.
- Website: Official website

The Soya-Mixed Meat Museum (traditional Chinese: 臺灣滷味博物館; simplified Chinese: 台湾卤味博物馆; pinyin: Táiwān Lǔwèi Bówùguǎn) is a food museum in Benjhou Industrial Park, Gangshan District, Kaohsiung, Taiwan.

== Exhibitions ==
The museum offers detailed information to the history and culture of marinated food, sea food and agriculture produces.

== Transportation ==
The museum is accessible north of Gangshan station of Taiwan Railway and Kaohsiung Metro.

== See also ==
- List of museums in Taiwan
