= Siaogangshan Skywalk Park =

Park in Gangshan, Kaohsiung, Taiwan

- 崗山之眼
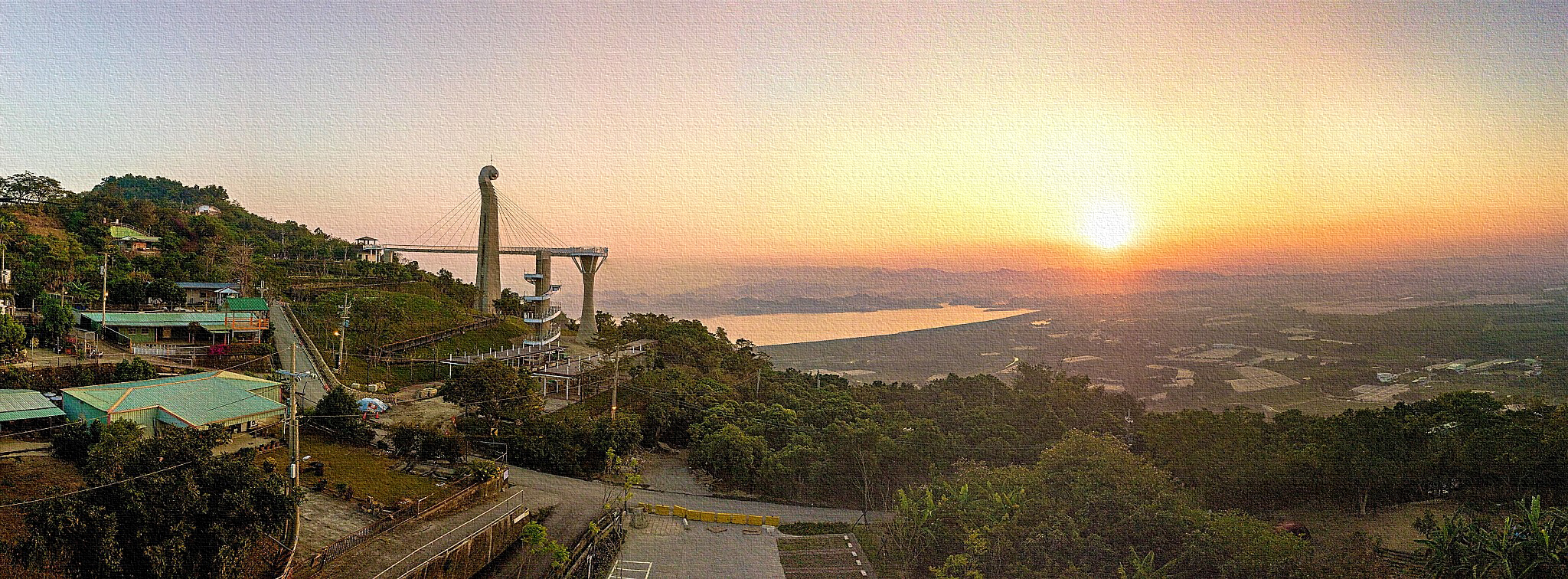
- Interactive map of Siaogangshan Skywalk Park
- Type: park
- Location: Gangshan, Kaohsiung, Taiwan
- Coordinates: 22°48′46.6″N 120°20′05.3″E
- Area: 1.8 hectares (4.4 acres)
- Opening: 14 February 2018
- Owner: Kaohsiung City Government
- Budget: NT$100 million
- Website: Official website (in Chinese)

The Siaogangshan Skywalk Park (traditional Chinese: 崗山之眼; simplified Chinese: 岗山之眼; pinyin: Gǎngshān Zhīyǎn) is a park in Gangshan District, Kaohsiung, Taiwan. The park is owned by Kaohsiung City Government.

== History ==
The park was constructed with a budget of almost NT$100 million. It was opened on a trial basis on 4 February 2018 and was officially opened on 14 February 2018. On 3 December 2018 to 4 February 2019, the park was closed for drainage and road works for a total cost of NT$17 million.

== Geology ==
The park spans over an area of 1.8 hectares and is located on a hilltop and overlooks the Agongdian Reservoir.

== Architecture ==
The park features a skywalk 40.5 metres (133 ft) in height, 88 metres (289 ft) in length and 2 metres (6 ft 7 in) in width. The shape of the skywalk resembles a violin for its main pylon and strings for its 24 suspension cables.

== Transportation ==
The park is accessible by bus from Kaohsiung Medical University Gangshan Hospital Station of Kaohsiung MRT.

== See also ==
- List of parks in Taiwan
