= Tianliao Moon World =

Baldlands in Tianliao, Kaohsiung, Taiwan

Tianliao Moon World 田寮月世界
- Badlands
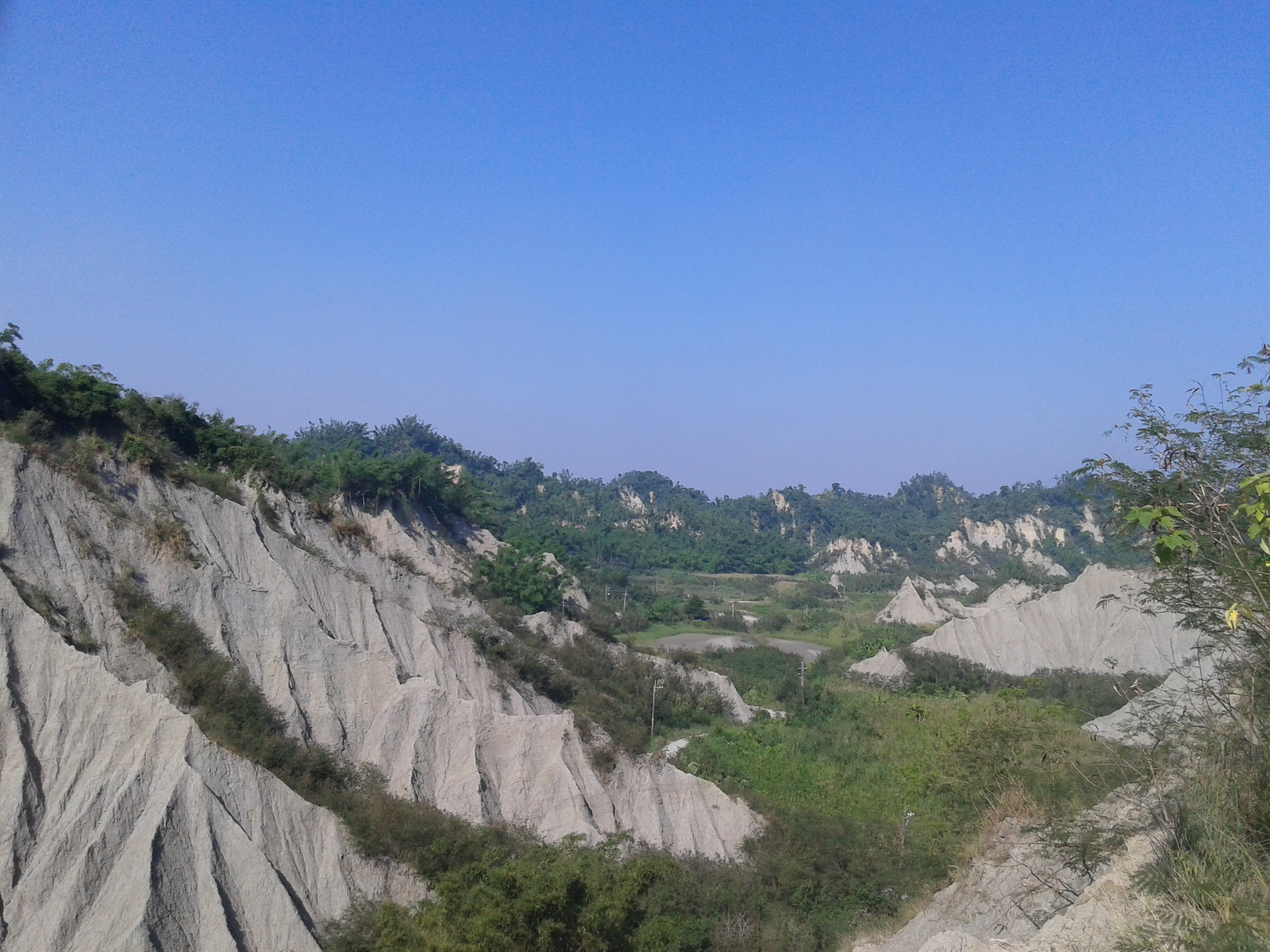
- Badlands formation in Tianliao

- Coordinates: 22°53′35.1″N 120°23′11.9″E
- Location: Tianliao, Kaohsiung, Taiwan
- Geology: badlands

The Tianliao Moon World (Chinese: 田寮月世界; pinyin: Tiánliáo Yuè Shìjiè) is an area of badlands in Tianliao District, Kaohsiung, Taiwan.

== Name ==
The area is named Moon World because its surface resembles the surface of the Moon.

== History ==
The formation was formed after years of rain and stream erosion.

== Facilities ==
The area features the Mudstone Geography Center at the entrance, providing information regarding the details of mudstone. It also has footpath for strolling and hiking around the area.

== Transportation ==
The area is accessible by bus from Gangshan station of Taiwan Railway and Kaohsiung Metro or Tainan station of Taiwan Railways.

== See also ==
- Geology of Taiwan
