= Kaohsiung Museum of Shadow Puppet =

Museum in Gangshan, Kaohsiung, Taiwan

- 高雄市皮影戲館
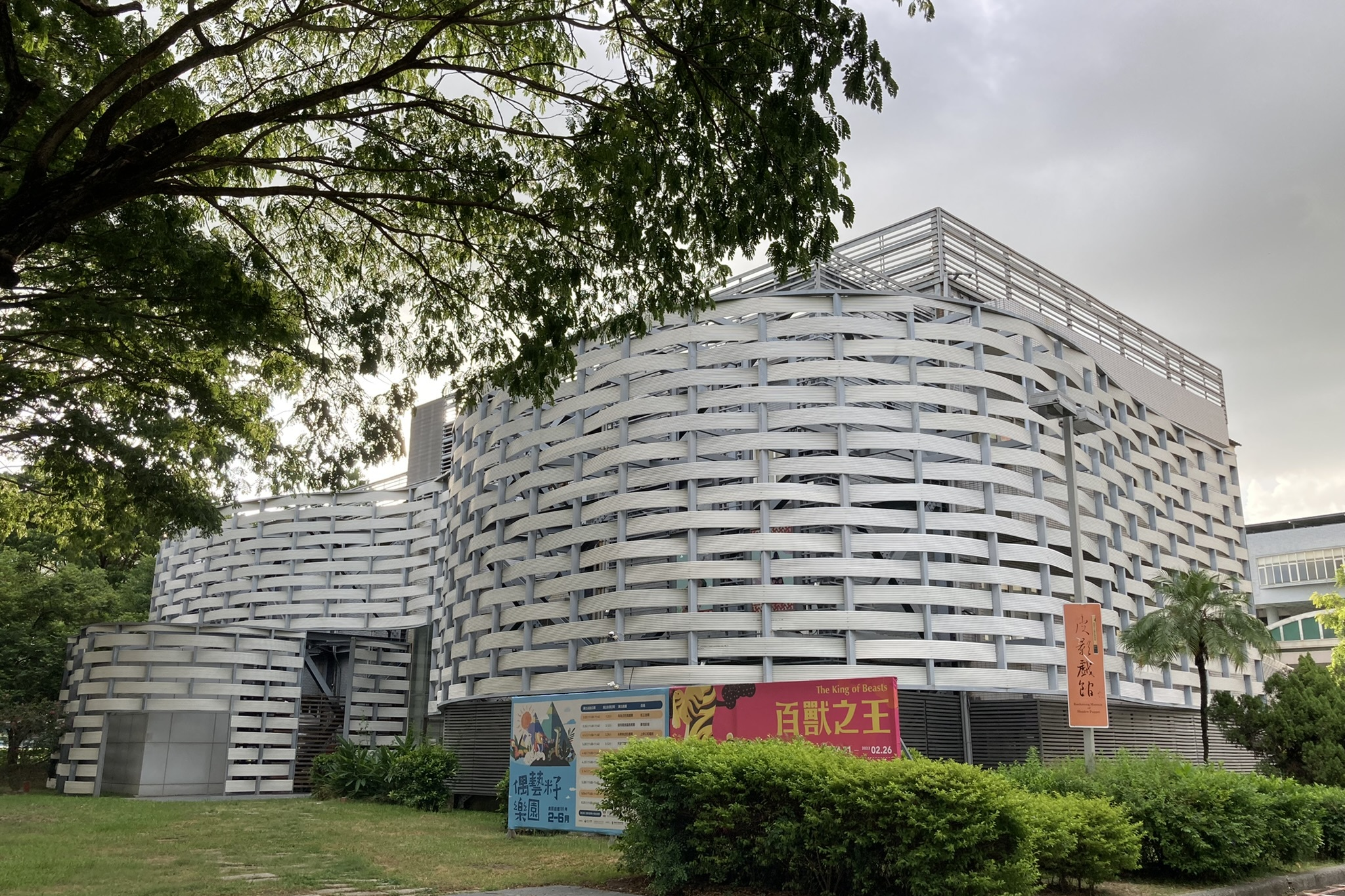
- Established: 13 March 1994
- Location: Gangshan, Kaohsiung, Taiwan
- Coordinates: 22°47′00″N 120°17′54″E
- Type: museum
- Architect: Chiu Kun-liang

The Kaohsiung Museum of Shadow Puppet (traditional Chinese: 高雄市皮影戲館; simplified Chinese: 高雄市皮影戏馆; pinyin: Gāoxióng Shì Píyǐngxì Guǎn) is a museum in Gangshan District, Kaohsiung, Taiwan.

== History ==
Kaohsiung County Government began researching the establishment of a museum in 1986 as instructed by the Council for Cultural Affairs (CCA) and the Taiwan Provincial Government Department of Education. Plains to build the museum were proposed by the Council for Cultural Affairs in 1987. The design of the museum building was completed in 1988 and construction took place between 1991 and 1993. The museum was officially opened on 13 March 1994. In September 2010, the building was damaged by Typhoon Fanapi. Subsequently, the museum was closed for reparation works and reopened in March 2012.

== Architecture ==
The museum was designed by Chiu Kun-liang. It has eight sections which spreads across four floors and basement, which are lobby, performance area, exhibition area, digital shadow play theater, experience area, reference room, promotion and research center and creative cultural product area.

== Transportation ==
The museum is accessible within walking distance south of Gangshan station of Taiwan Railway and Kaohsiung Metro.

== See also ==
- List of museums in Taiwan
