= Sinhua District =

District in Tainan, Taiwan

Coordinates: 23°2′18″N 120°18′39″E

Sinhua 新化區 Shinka; Sin-Hua
- District
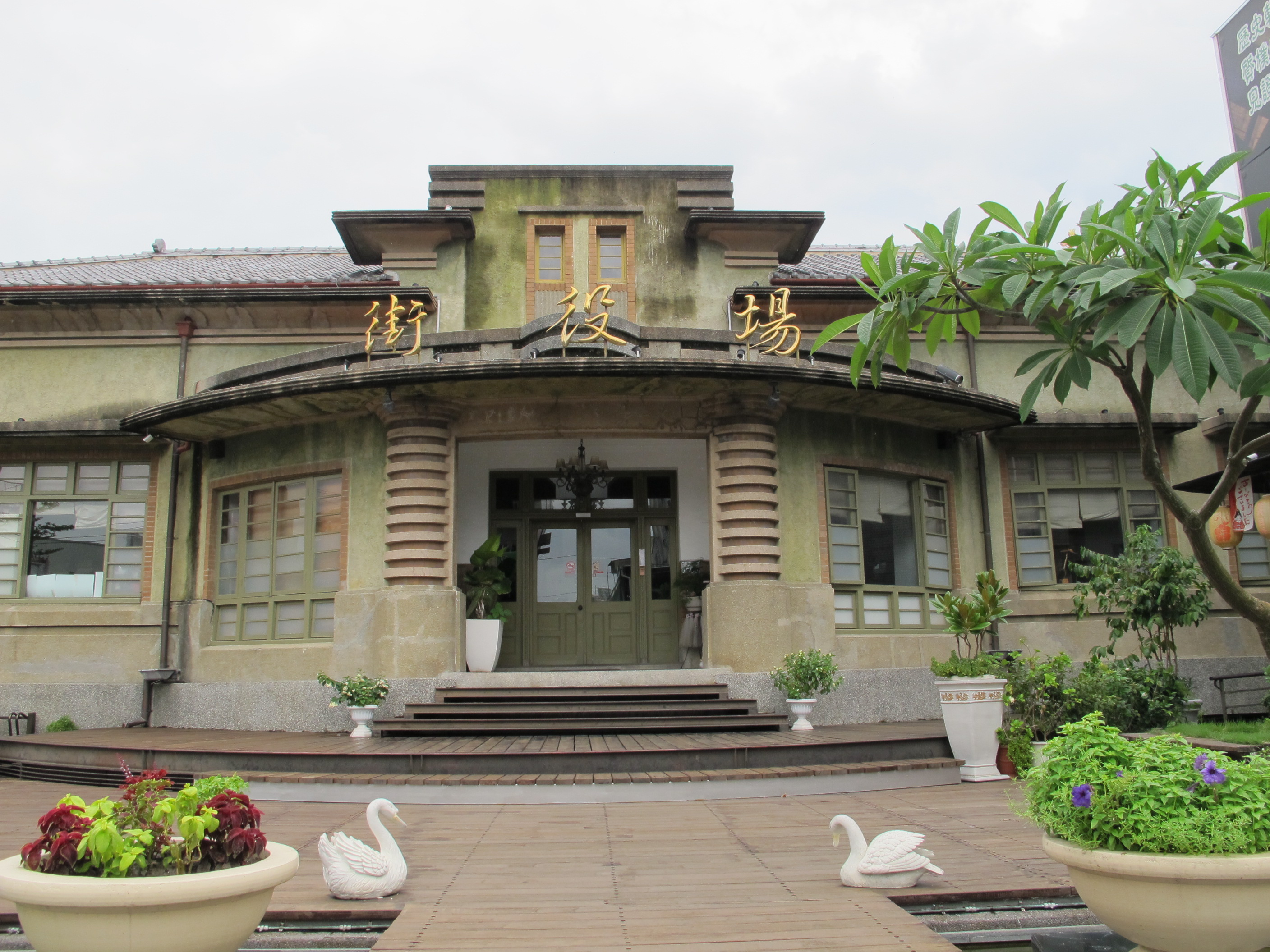
- Japanese-era Town Government Hall

- Sinhua District in Tainan City
- Location: Tainan, Taiwan

Area
  - Total: 62 km^{2} (24 sq mi)

Population (May 2022)
  - Total: 42,514
  - Density: 690/km^{2} (1,800/sq mi)
- Website: web.tainan.gov.tw/sinhua_en/

Sinhua District
- Chinese: 新化區
Transcriptions
Standard Mandarin
- Hanyu Pinyin: Xīnhuà
- Wade–Giles: Hsin1-hua4
- Tongyong Pinyin: Sinhuà
Southern Min
- Hokkien POJ: Sin-hòa

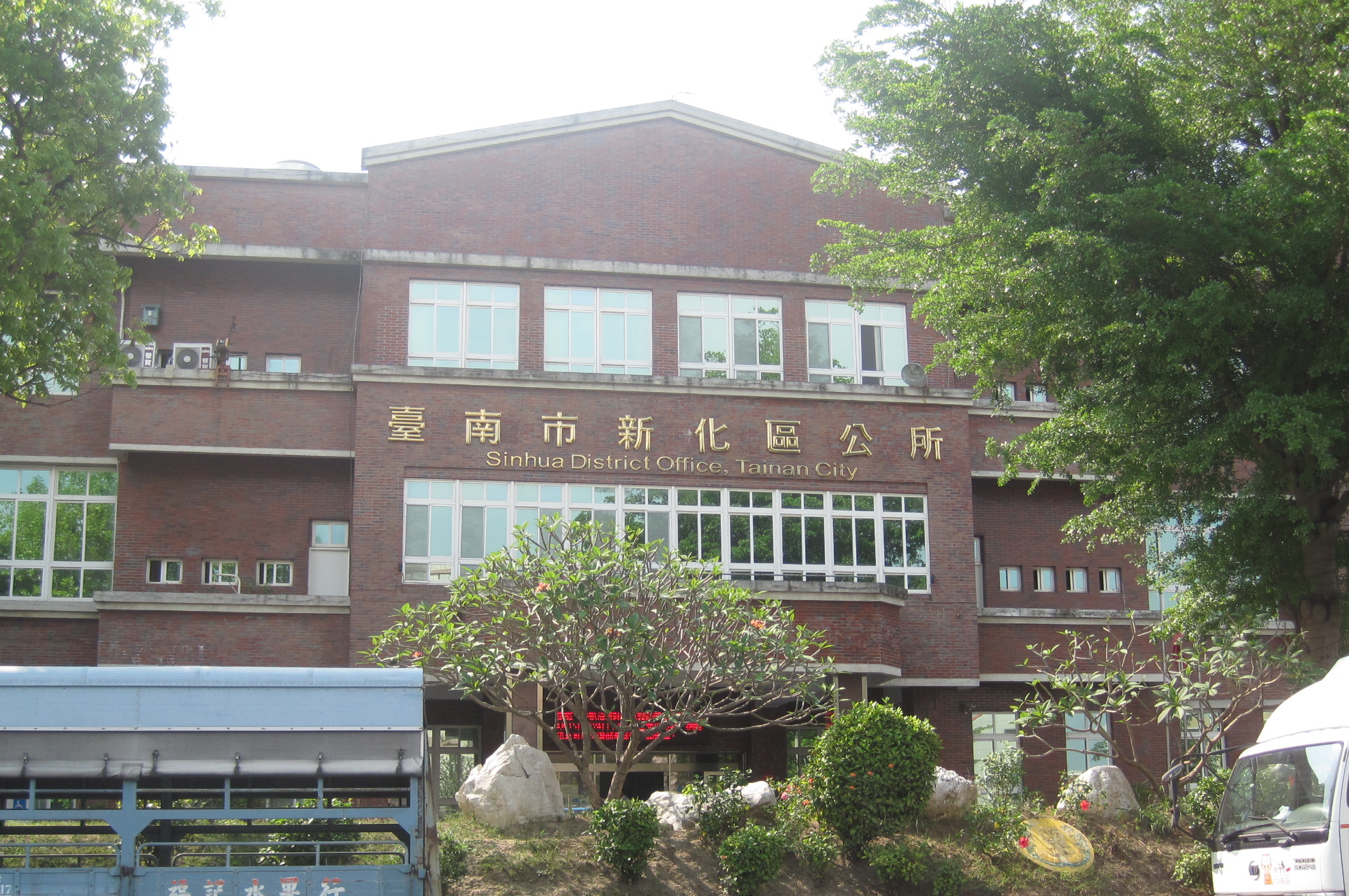
Sinhua District Office

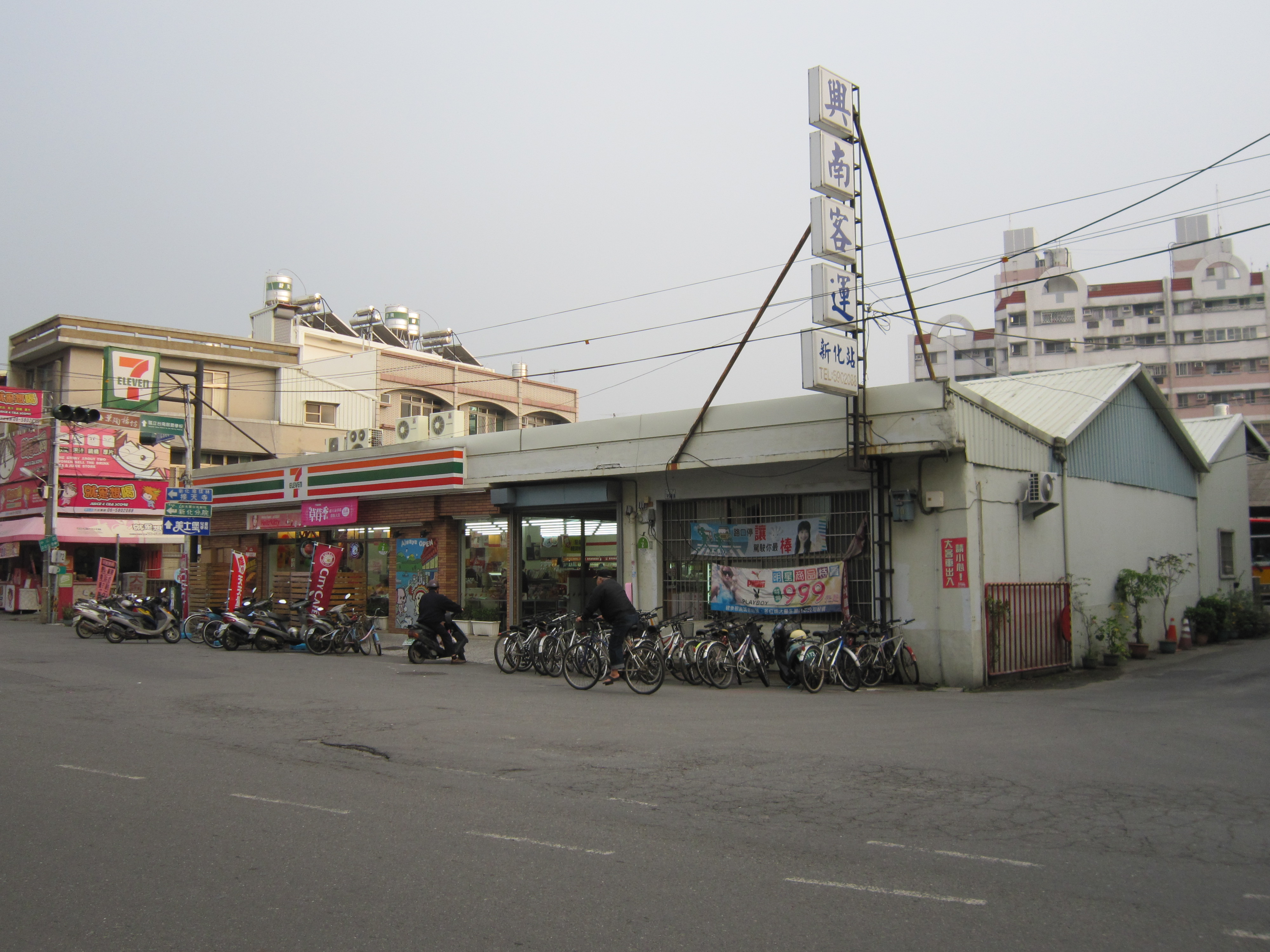
Shinhua Station of Shing Nan Bus Co.

Sinhua District (Chinese: 新化區; Hanyu Pinyin: Xīnhuà Qū; Tongyong Pinyin: Sinhuà Cyu; Wade–Giles: Hsin^{¹}-hua^{⁴} Ch'ü^{¹}), alternatively spelled Xinhua, is a suburban district in central Tainan, Taiwan.

== History ==
Before the Dutch and Han Chinese invaded, this region was home to a community of Taiwanese aborigines, the Siraya. In 1624, the VOC occupied Tayuan (modern day Anping, Tainan).

In the past, the Siraya indigenous tribe called this place Tavocan ("land of hill and forest"). Tavakan was a village of about a thousand people; the name was also written Taffacan, Tavocan, Tavacang, and Davocan in Dutch records. The village grew into the market-town of Twa-bak-kang (Chinese: 大目降; Pe̍h-ōe-jī: Tōa-ba̍k-kàng), about 2 miles (3.2 km) southeast of Sin-kang (modern-day Sinshih).

After 1627, the VOC sent missionaries into neighboring districts. In 1635, George Candidius, a Dutch pastor, advised Pieter Nuyts, the leader of the Dutch VOC in Taiwan, that the VOC would have to conquer the aborigines before they could be controlled. In 1636, eighteen tribal groups, including the inhabitants of Tavocan, submitted to Dutch rule.

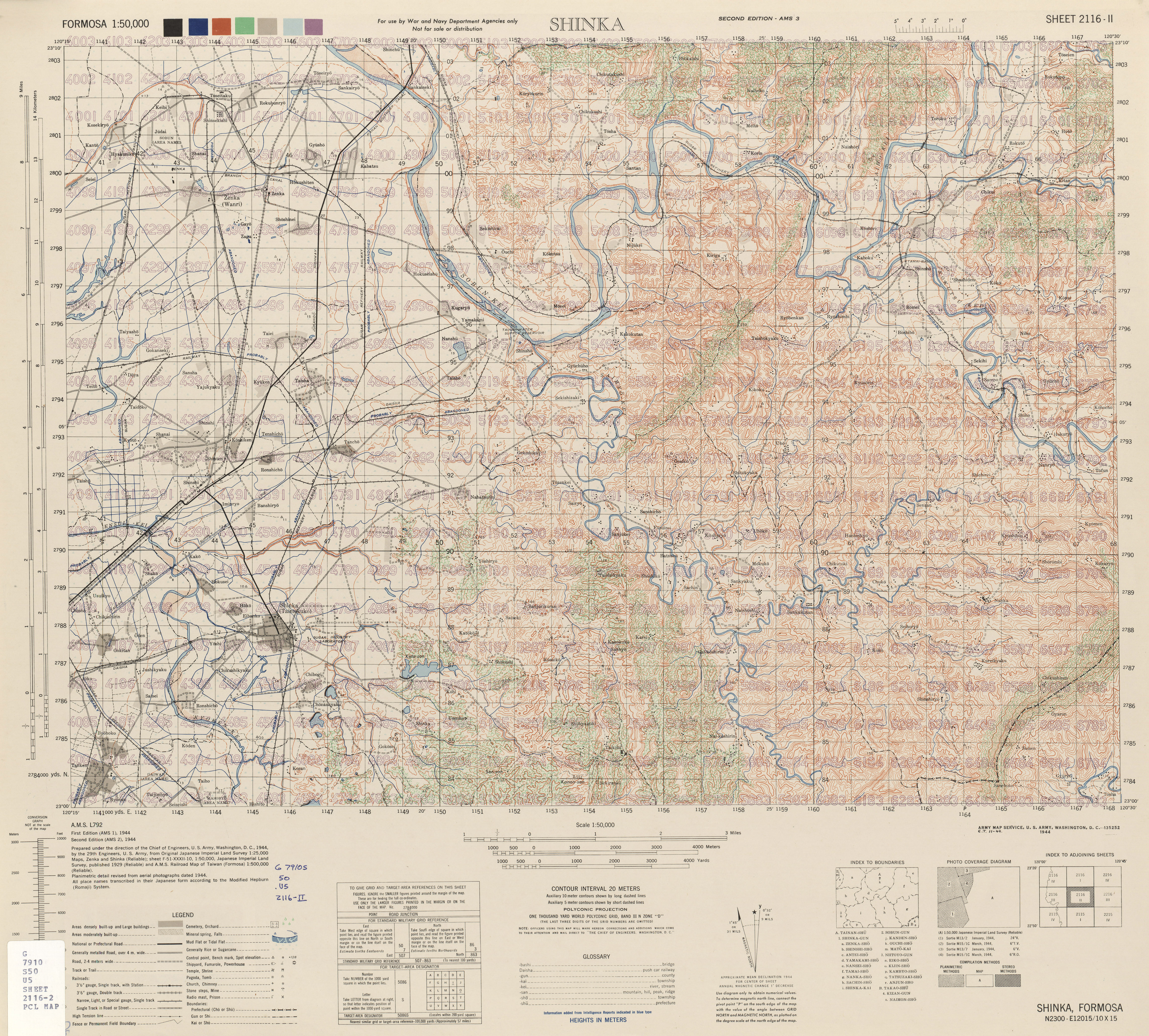
Map of Sinhua (labeled as Shinka (Taimokuko)) (1944)

Since the early part of the 20th century, Sinhua has been an important fruit wholesaling center. Around 1920, dozens of baroque-influenced store buildings were constructed along what is now Jhongjheng Road. Most of these buildings survive in good condition, and the street, known as "Sinhua Old Street," has become a tourist attraction.

In 1945, Sinshih Township was part of Sinhua District.

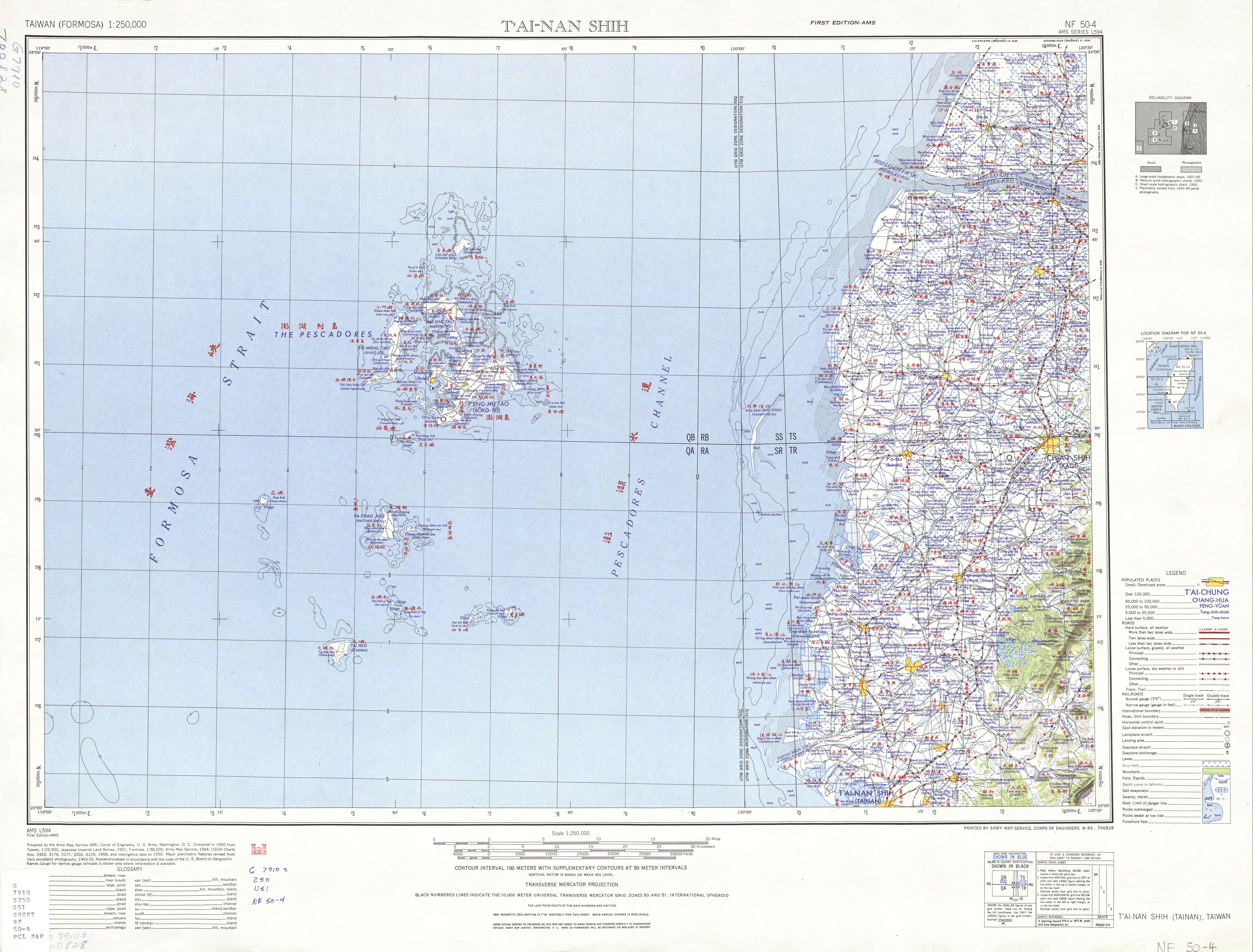
Map of Sinhua (labeled as Hsin-hua (Shinka) 新化) (1950)

The Taiwan Communist Party was established on 20 June 2008 in Sinhua.

== Geography ==
- Area: 62.06 km^{2}
- Population: 43,830 people (January 2016)

Much of the district is rural, with large areas devoted to pineapple cultivation. Sinhua is located on Taiwan Highway No. 20, also known as the Southern Cross-Island Highway, and Freeway Nos. 3 and 8. It borders Yongkang, Shanshang, Sinshih and Guanmiao districts.

The eastern half of the district lies within the Siraya National Scenic Area.

== Administrative divisions ==
The district consists of Wu-An/Wuan, Dong-Rong/Tungrong, Hu-Guo/Huguo, Tai-Ping/Taiping, Sie-Sing/Xiexing, Fong-Kou/Fengkou, Bei-Shih/Beishi, Fong-Rong/Fengrong, Cyan-Sing/Quanxing, Lun-Ding/Lunding, Jhih-Yi/Zhiyi, Shan-Jiao/Shanjiao, Da-Keng/Dakeng, Na-Ba/Naba, Yang-Lin/Xianglin, Jiao-Keng/Jiaokeng Village.

== Institutions ==
- Taiwan Livestock Research Institute

== Education ==
=== Special School ===
- The Affiliated Hearing Impaired School of National University of Tainan

=== Senior High Schools ===
- National Hsin Hua Senior High School
- National Hsin Hua Industrial Vocational High School

=== Junior high schools ===
- Tainan Municipal Hsin Hua Junior High School

== Tourist attractions ==
- Hutoupi Scenic Area
- Xinhua Old Street
- Yang Kui Literature Memorial Museum

== Transportation ==
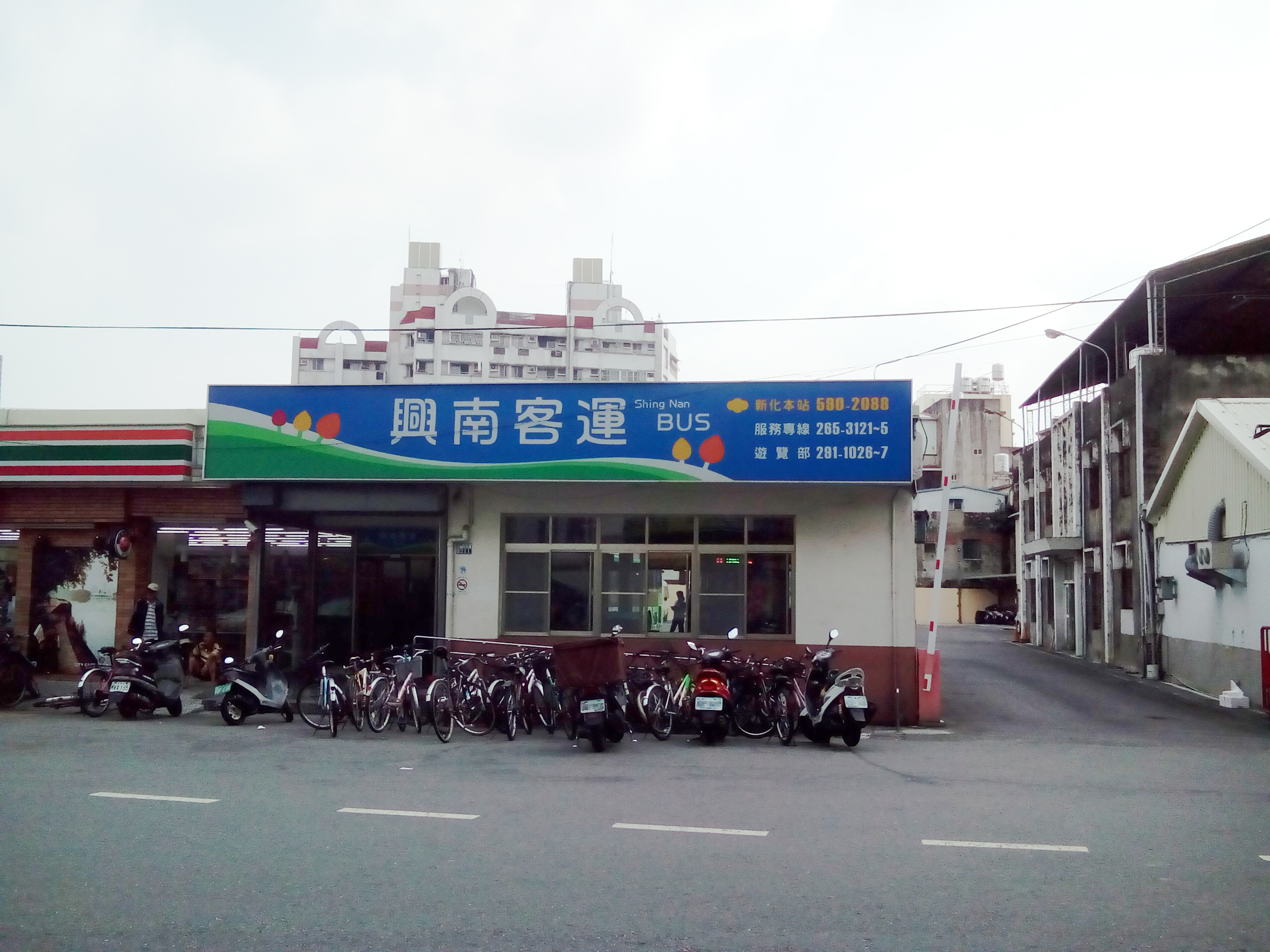
Sinhua Bus Station

The Sinhua Bus Station is located in the district. The district is connected to Kaohsiung at Alian District through the Provincial Highway 39.

The Taiwan High Speed Rail track passes through the western part of the district; no station is planned, however.

== Notable people ==
- Ou Wei, former actor
- Yang Kui, former writer

== See also ==
- Tainan
