= Yang Kui =

Taiwanese writer and social activist

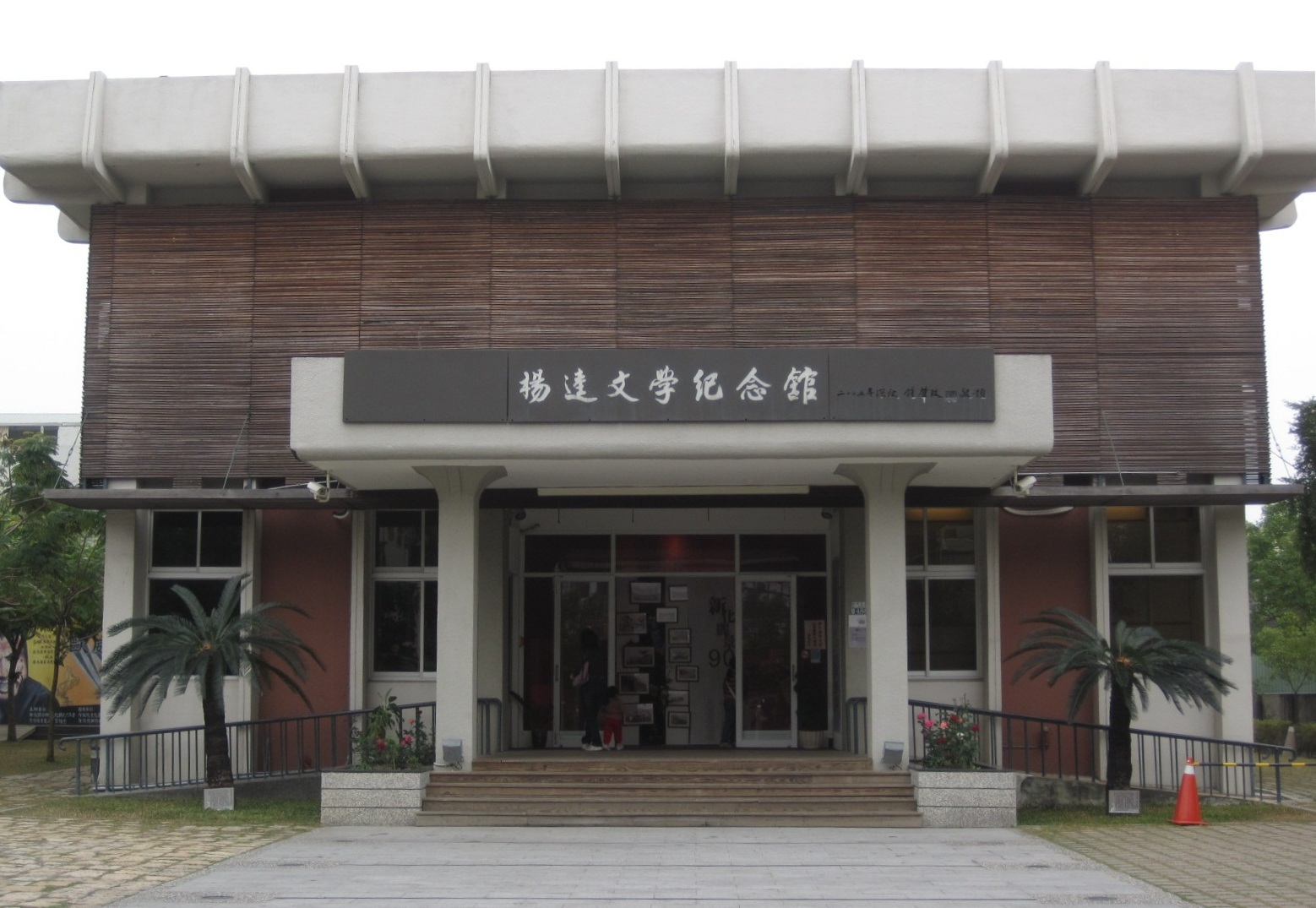
Yang Kui Literature Memorial Museum

Yang Kui (Chinese: 楊逵; pinyin: Yáng Kuí; Wade–Giles: Yang K'uei; Pe̍h-ōe-jī: Iûⁿ Kùi; 18 October 1906 – 12 March 1985) or Yō Ki, originally named Yang Kui (楊貴), was a Taiwanese writer and social activist born in Tainan, Taiwan. He used pen names such as Yang-kuei (楊逵), Yang Chien-wen (楊建文), Lai Chien-erh (賴健兒), Lin Ssu-wen (林泗文), and Ito Ryo (伊東 亮).

Raised in Japanese-language schools, Yang Kui went to the Japanese mainland, where he experienced both persecution and acceptance, especially by Japanese communists. Under these influences he became a proletarian novelist. After World War II, he was imprisoned by the Kuomintang government from 1949 to 1961. After being released from prison, he had to learn the Chinese language from his granddaughter Yang Tsui, as Japanese had been the common language of Taiwan until the time of his imprisonment.

Yang Kuei actively participated in various social movements and organizations, including the Taiwan Peasants’ Association during the Japanese rule period, the Taiwanese Cultural Association, Taiwan Alliance for Literature and Arts, and the opposition movement after the arrival of the Nationalist government.

In honor of Yang Kuei, the Yang Kui Literature Memorial Museum was established in Xinhua District, Tainan City. It officially opened on November 27, 2005, and features Yang Kuei's manuscripts, documents, such as the first edition of "The Newspaper Carrier" translated by Hu Feng (胡風) and published by Tung Hua Book Co. in 1947, and other artifacts.

== Life ==
=== Early life ===
Yang Kui was born the child of a tinsmith family. He entered Daimokukō Public School in 1915, having delayed doing so due to health problems. In 1915, Yang was a witness to the Jiaobanian Incident, which changed his view of the Japanese negatively. After graduation from Daimokukō Public School, Yang studied at Tainan No. 2 High School, where he read the literary works of Natsume Sōseki, Akutagawa Ryūnosuke, and Charles Dickens, as well as works of Russian literature and Revolutionary French literature, including especially Les Miserables by Victor Hugo, which "particularly touched" him due to its description of social conflict.

In 1923, having read the book Taiwan hishi (A Record of Taiwanese Rebels) that went against his experience of the Jiaobanian Incident, Yang began to write to "correct history". He moved to Tokyo in 1924 to escape a proposed marriage to his parents' adoptive daughter and to study social thought. In Tokyo, Yang encountered "proletarian literature", reading leftist magazines and participating in leftist movements. In 1926, Yang founded a cultural studies group and met avant-garde playwright Sasaki Takamaru, and in 1927, he founded a "Study Meeting for Social Science". He was later arrested for being involved in an anti-Japanese lecture.

=== Return to Taiwan ===
Yang returned to Taiwan in 1927, joining the Taiwan Peasants’ Association. In 1928, he was elected to the committee of the Taiwanese Cultural Association, through which in 1929 he met his mentor Lai He. Both organizations were later disbanded in March 1931 by the colonial government in their suppression of Taiwanese communists. With radicalism having been suppressed, Yang began again to write heavily.

== Writing ==
Yang Kui's debut in Japanese literary circles was through his work Jiyū rōdōsha no seikatsu danmen (A Slice of the Life of Free Laborers), which was published in 1927 in the official magazine of the Journalists Association of Tokyo, Gōgai.

In 1932, Yang published the novella The Newspaper Carrier in Taiwan xinminbao (Taiwan New People's News). It was published in Chinese as Songbaofu. Yang published under the name Yang Kui instead of his original name Yang Gui, having been convinced to do so by Lai He. In 1934, his short story “The Newspaper Carrier” (新聞配達夫) was selected for the Tokyo Bungaku hyōron (文學評論) magazine, marking the first time a Taiwanese writer entered the mainstream literary field in Japan. It was during this period that he first used the pen name "Yang Kuei", and it helped to establish Yang Kuei's reputation as a novelist.

Yang Kuei began writing in Japanese, and his early works included essays, short stories, and novels. After World War II, he continued to write, but he was arrested for his involvement in social movements and for publishing the "Peace Declaration". While in prison, his Chinese writing skills matured. His short story "The Indomitable Rose" (originally titled "Spring Light Can't Be Confined") was included in high school Chinese textbooks, marking the first instance of a work by a Taiwanese writer from the Japanese rule period being selected for textbooks. Yang Kuei was a self-described "socialist with a humanitarian heart." He believed that literature should be written from the perspective of the people, and he used his writing to expose social injustice and the suffering and oppression of the working class. No. 38 of Taiwan Literature: English Translation Series (2016) is a special issue dedicated to Yang Kuei.

Yang was influenced by Russian realist literature, Karl Marx's Capital, and Japanese proletarian movements, using them to influence his socialist ideas. He had also been influenced by anarchism, having read Mikhail Bakunin and Peter Kropotkin after the death of Ōsugi Sakae. Yang identified as a "humanitarian socialist", and associated with Japanese socialists and unionists. He defended realism, and believed that literature "had to come from the indigenous soil" instead of being about "the war effort or personal aestheticism".

== See also ==
- Yang Kui Literature Memorial Museum
