= Provincial Highway 37 (Taiwan) =

Provincial highway in Taiwan

Provincial Highway 37
- 台37線
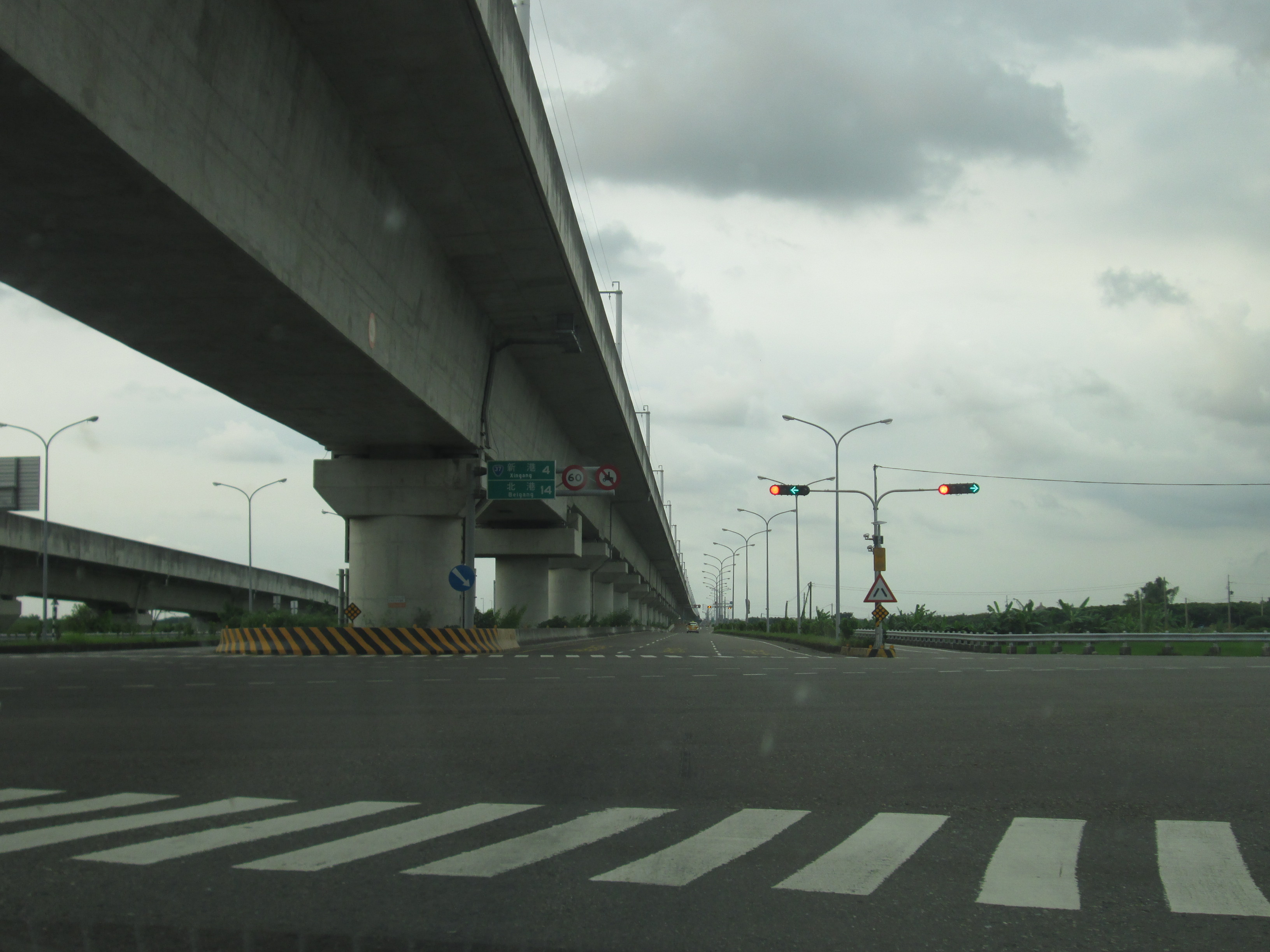

Route information
- Maintained by Directorate General of Highways
- Length: 14.417 km (8.958 mi)

Major junctions
- North end: County Road 164 in Xingang, Chiayi
- South end: County Road 167 in Lucao, Chiayi

Location
- Country: Taiwan

Highway system
- Highway system in Taiwan
← Prov 31	→ Prov 39

Provincial Highway 37 is a Taiwanese highway that starts from Xingang and ends in Lucao, both in Chiayi County. The highway connects THSR Chiayi Station with Chiayi City and Chiayi County, and runs along the underpass of the elevated viaduct for high-speed rail. The route length is 14.417 kilometres (8.958 mi) .

== See also ==
- Highway system in Taiwan
