= Gangshan Water Tower =

Water tower in Gangshan, Kaohsiung, Taiwan

- 岡山水塔
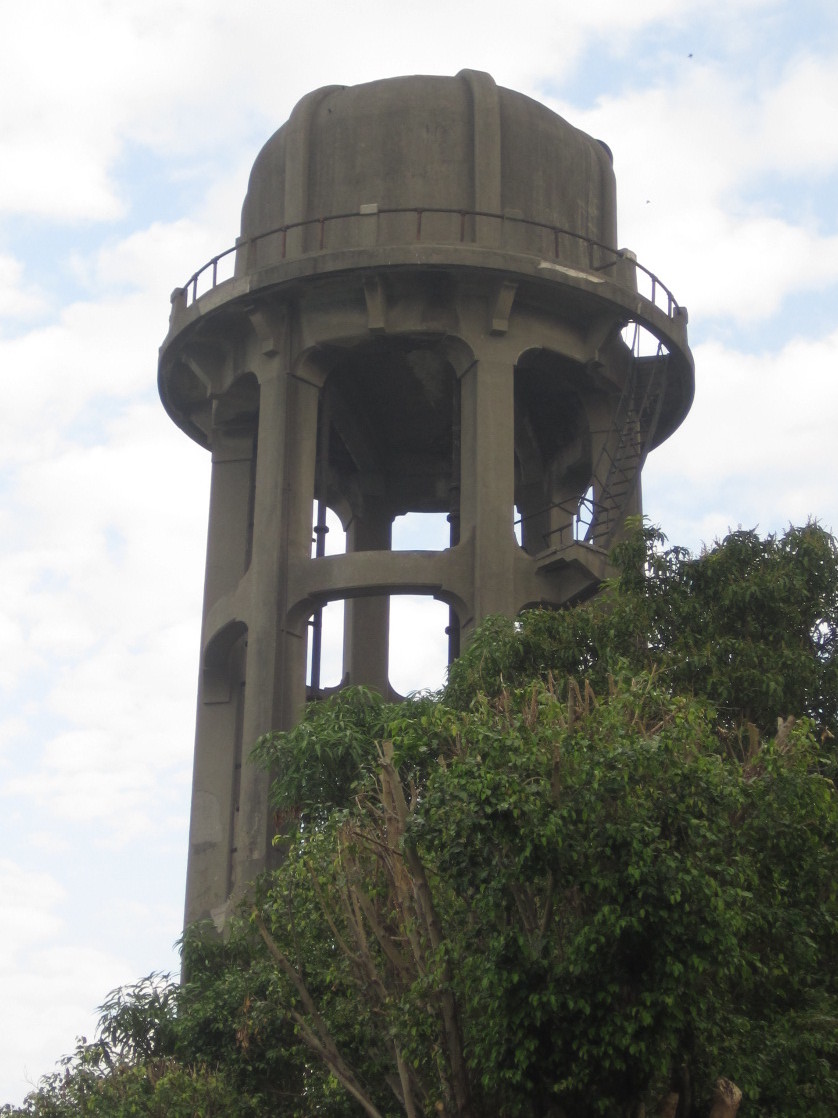
- Interactive map of the Gangshan Water Tower area

General information
- Type: water tower
- Location: Gangshan, Kaohsiung, Taiwan
- Coordinates: 22°47′51.3″N 120°17′44.2″E
- Completed: April 1938

The Gangshan Water Tower (traditional Chinese: 岡山水塔; simplified Chinese: 冈山水塔; pinyin: Gāngshān Shuǐtǎ; Pe̍h-ōe-jī: Kong-san Chúi-thah) is a historical water tower in Gangshan District, Kaohsiung, Taiwan.

== History ==
Gangshan Street, the area where the tower is located, used to be the main economic center of the region during the Japanese rule of Taiwan. It was the meeting point of people to do business, thus the construction of aqueduct was imminent to sustain the activities. In 1925, the Gangshan Aqueduct was constructed and completed in 1926, a water canal and water purification system based on the Qing Dynasty style. In 1929, the expansion work was carried out due to the inadequate capacity of Gangshan Aqueduct. The Ghangshan Water Tower was then constructed and completed in April 1938. The water tower supplied water to the area until 1992 when it was decommissioned.

== Transportation ==
The water tower is accessible within walking distance northwest of Gangshan station of Taiwan Railway and Kaohsiung Metro.

== See also ==
- List of tourist attractions in Taiwan
- Water supply and sanitation in Taiwan
