= Hutoupi Scenic Area =

Park in Xinhua, Tainan, Taiwan

- 虎頭埤風景區
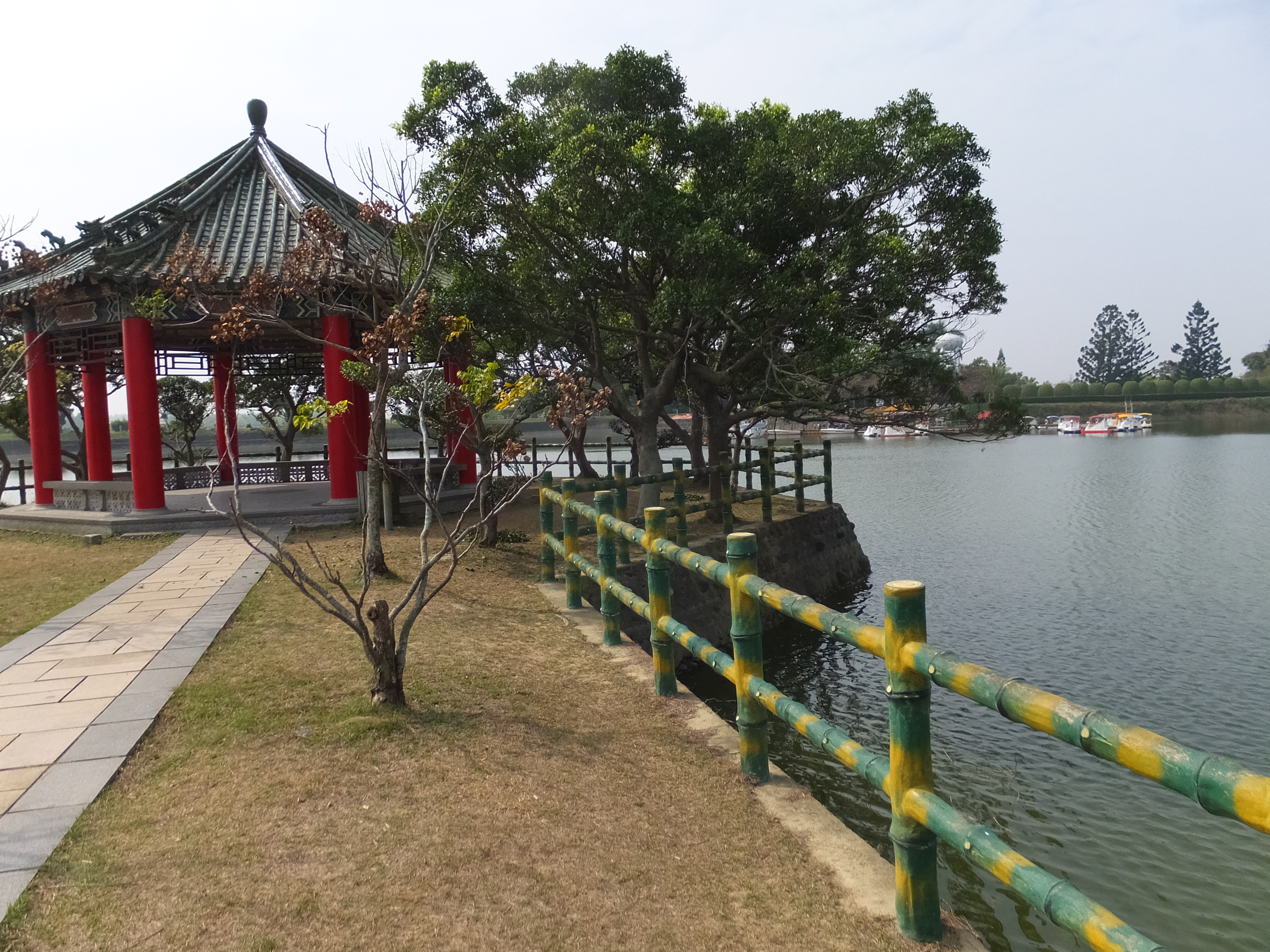
- Interactive map of Hutoupi Scenic Area
- Type: park
- Location: Xinhua, Tainan, Taiwan
- Coordinates: 23°01′39.8″N 120°20′27.7″E
- Website: Official website (in Chinese)

Hutoupi Scenic Area (traditional Chinese: 虎頭埤風景區; simplified Chinese: 虎头埤风景区; pinyin: Hǔtóupí Fēngjǐng Qū) is a park in Xinhua District, Tainan, Taiwan.

== History ==
The park consists of a reservoir which was established in 1846 for the purpose of supplying water to the farm areas around it for irrigation. In 1954, the Literature Committee of Tainan County Government chose the park as one of the top eight wonders of Tainan County.

== Architecture ==
The park features the Tiger Moon Suspension Bridge (Chinese: 虎月吊橋) and a pavilion at the center of the lake island.

== Facilities ==
The park also features facilities such as accommodation, barbecue, bicycle renting, camping, conference room, food service etc.

== Transportation ==
The park is accessible by bus from Tainan Station of Taiwan Railway.

== See also ==
- List of parks in Taiwan
