= Tianliao District =

District in Kaohsiung, Taiwan

Coordinates: 22.865104°N 120.389503°E

Tianliao 田寮區
- District
- Tianliao District
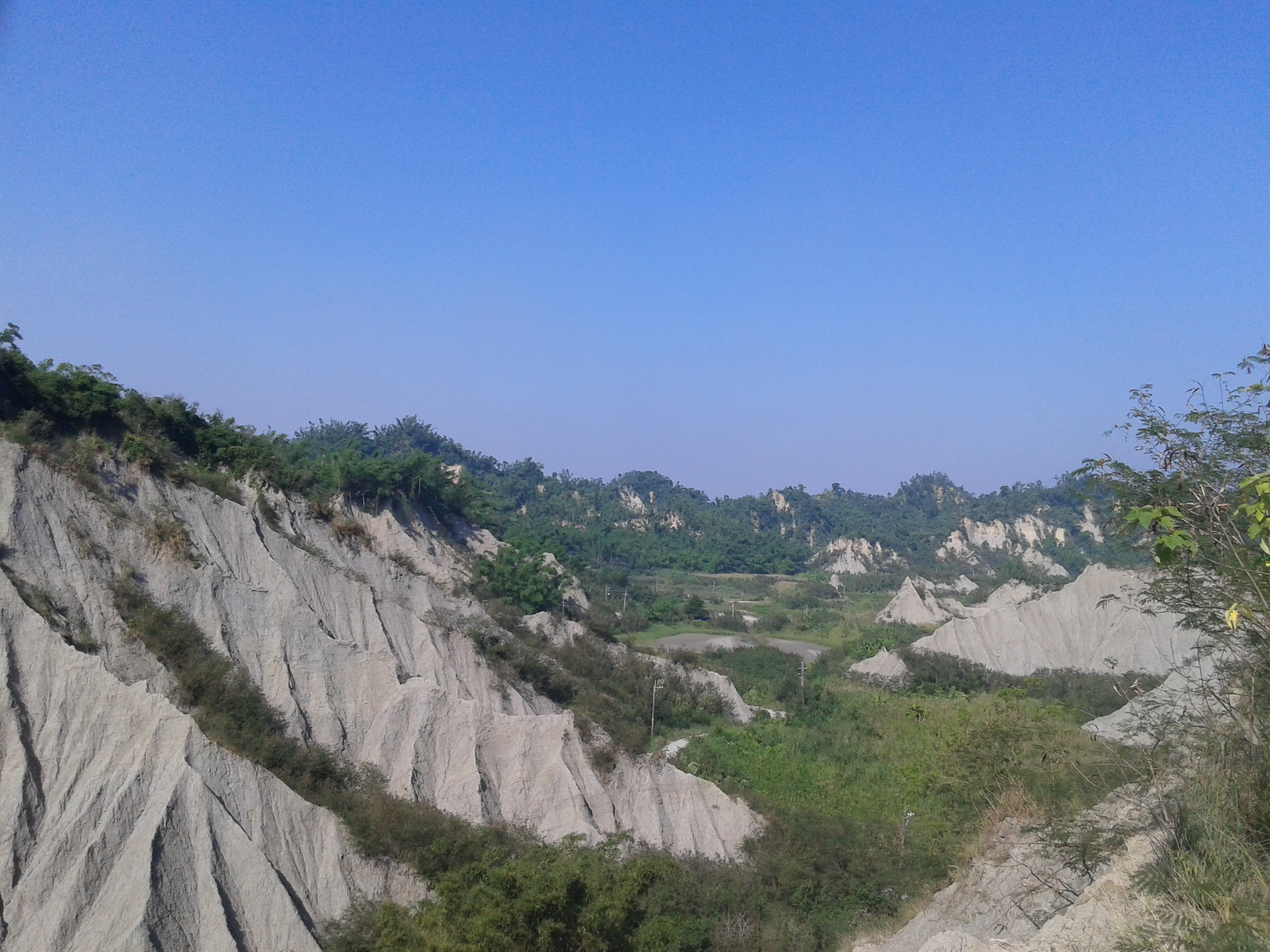
- Badlands formation in Tianliao

- Tianliao District in Kaohsiung City
- Country: Taiwan
- Region: Southern Taiwan

Population (October 2023)
  - Total: 6,555
- Website: tianliao.kcg.gov.tw/en/

Tianliao District (Chinese: 田寮區; pinyin: Tiánliáo Qū; Wade–Giles: T'ien^{2}-liao^{2} Ch'ü^{1}; Pe̍h-ōe-jī: Chhân-liâu-khu) is a suburban district of Kaohsiung City, Taiwan.

== History ==
After the handover of Taiwan from Japan to the Republic of China in 1945, Tianliao was organized as a rural township of Kaohsiung County. On 25 December 2010, Kaohsiung County merged with Kaohsiung City and Tianliao was upgraded to a district of the city.

== Administrative divisions ==
The district consists of Lupu, Nanan, Datong, Tianliao, Qixing, Chongde, Xide, Sanhe, Guting and Xinxing Village.

== Tourist attractions ==
- Agongdian Reservoir
- Chaoyuan Temple (朝元寺)
- Danantian Fude Temple (大南天福德祠)
- Lyu Family Ancient House
- Mount Matou
- Narrow Sky
- Rihyue Temple (日月禪寺)
- Shihmuru
- Shihzueizai Pavilion
- Tianliao Moon World

== Notable natives ==
- Su Jain-rong, Minister of Finance

== See also ==
- Kaohsiung
