= The Newspaper Carrier =

1932 novella by Yang Kuei

The Newspaper Carrier (Chinese: 送報伕; Japanese: 新聞配達夫) is a Japanese novella written by Taiwanese author Yang Kuei (楊逵), published in 1932. In 1934, it won the second prize in the Tokyo Literary Review (文學評論) magazine (the first prize was not awarded that year), marking the first time a Taiwanese writer received an award in the Japanese literary world and establishing Yang Kuei's reputation.

In the initial release of The Newspaper Carrier, the first half was permitted, but the Taiwan Governor-General's Office banned the publication of the second half. Despite the ban, the work was awarded, but the version reissued in 1934 continued to be prohibited from sale in Taiwan. In 1936, Chinese literary theorist Hu Feng (胡風) translated it into Chinese, publishing it in the Shanghai-based magazine World Knowledge (世界知識). In Taiwan, a Chinese-Japanese bilingual edition of The Newspaper Carrier was published based on this translation after 1946.

In 2016, the story was translated in Issue 38 of Taiwan Literature: English Translation Series as The Newspaper Carrier. In 2020, the story was once again translated into English by Nikki Lin (林巾力), director of National Museum of Taiwan Literature, as The Newspaper Boy in A Taiwanese Literature Reader, a volume of Taiwan short stories written during the period of the Japanese rule.

The narrative follows a Taiwanese young man named Yang (楊君), whose family's farmland is exploited by the government and sugar industry capitalists. Seeking new opportunities, he goes to Tokyo and becomes a newsboy. Exploited and deceived by the capitalists, he loses his job, depletes his savings, and learns that his mother has committed suicide. Witnessing the newsboys in Tokyo unite and strike, forcing the capitalists to concede and improve working conditions, providing fair treatment, he returns to his hometown armed with the experience gained from the struggle.

The novella portrays the journey of a working-class individual from ignorance, fear, and suffering to unity. It emphasizes the struggle of the proletariat to assert their rights and actively resist capitalist exploitation, ultimately finding personal confidence and self-worth. Yang Kuei's work reflects the perspective of an intellectual advocating for social reform and resistance against societal injustices.
