= Xinhua Old Street =

Street in Xinhua, Tainan, Taiwan

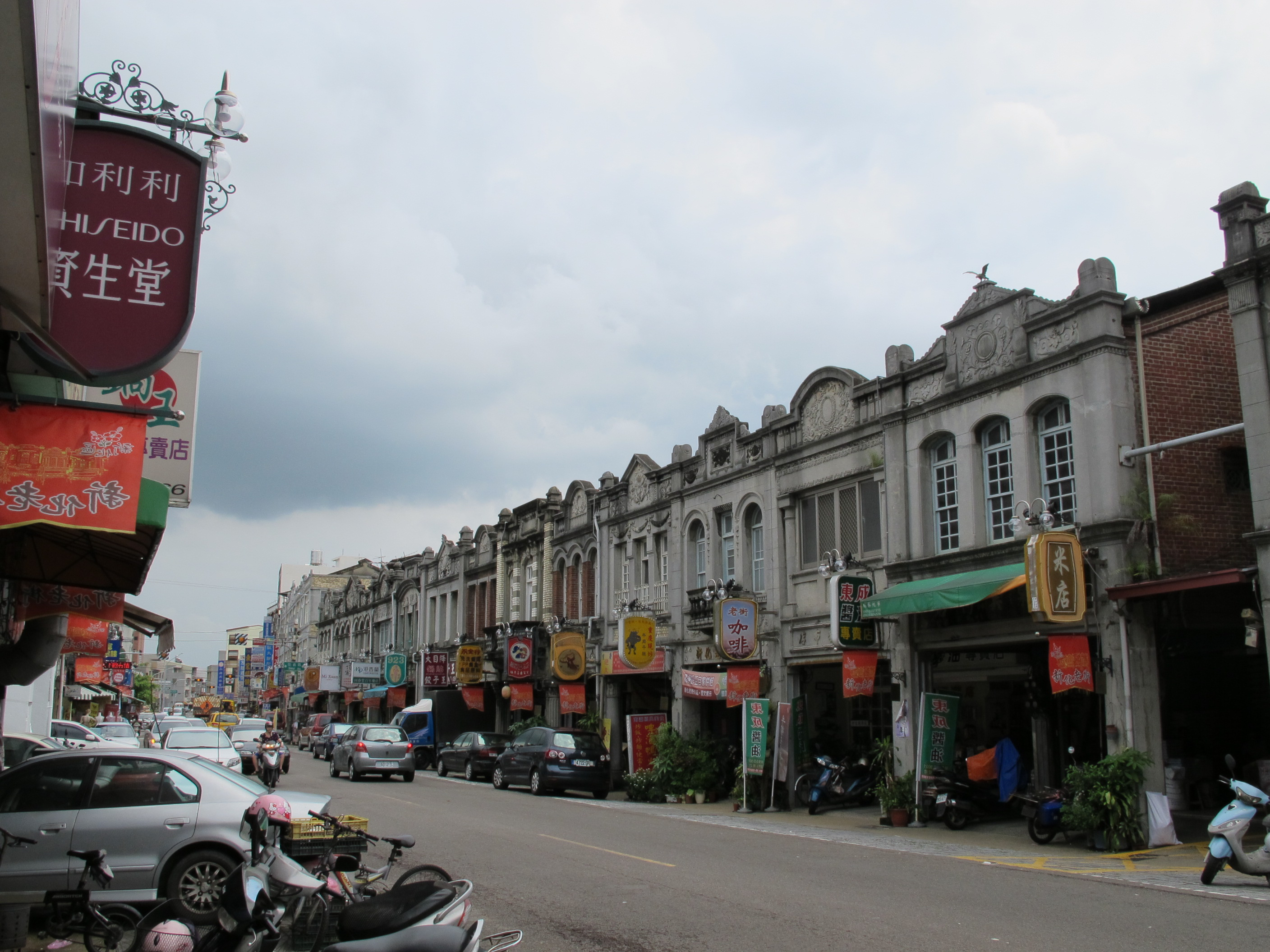

- Location within Taiwan
- Native name: 新化老街 (Chinese)
- Type: Street
- Location: Xinhua, Tainan, Taiwan
- Coordinates: 23°02′07.4″N 120°18′29.5″E

The Xinhua Old Street (Chinese: 新化老街; pinyin: Xīnhuà Lǎojiē) is a street in Xinhua District, Tainan, Taiwan.

== History ==
The street used to be an important business hub in the 1920s engaged in wholesale fruits business. In 1921, the west side of Zhongzheng Road underwent major construction and the east side followed soon afterwards. In 1937, some Japanese government officials ordered the whole buildings along the road to be renovated into Baroque style according to urban plan.

== Architecture ==
Buildings along the street are foreign-style houses with Baroque-style architecture, which was the most modern style of buildings during the Japanese rule of Taiwan.

== See also ==
- List of roads in Taiwan
- List of tourist attractions in Taiwan
