= Provincial Highway 39 (Taiwan) =

Road in Taiwan

Provincial Highway 39
- 台39線

Route information
- Maintained by Directorate General of Highways
- Length: 18.83 km (11.70 mi)

Major junctions
- North end: Prov 20 in Xinhua District, Tainan
- South end: Prov 28 in Alian District, Kaohsiung

Location
- Country: Taiwan

Highway system
- Highway system in Taiwan
← Prov 37	→ Prov 61

Provincial Highway 39 is a Taiwanese highway that starts from Xinhua, Tainan City and ends in Alian District, Kaohsiung. The highway connects THSR Tainan Station with Tainan City and northern Kaohsiung City, and runs along the underpass of the elevated viaduct for high-speed rail. The route length is 18.83 kilometres (11.70 mi) .

== See also ==
- Highway system in Taiwan
