= Republic of China Air Force Academy =

Military academy in Gangshan, Kaohsiung, Taiwan

- 中華民國空軍軍官學校
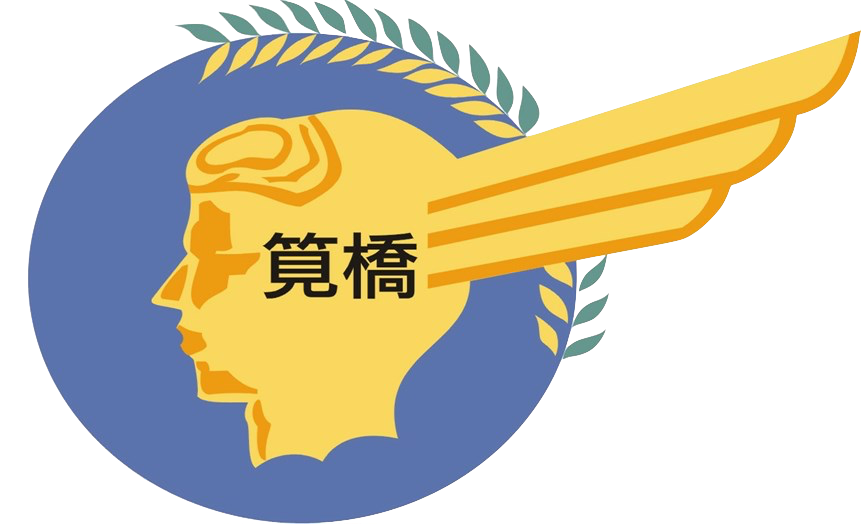
- The school badge of the Air Force Academy, "筧橋" refers to the Jianqiao Airport
- Former names: Central Army Academy's Aviation Corps (1928-1929); Central Army Academy's Aviation Class (1929-1932); Central Aviation School (1932-1938)
- Type: Military academy
- Established: 1928
- Superintendent: Major-General Wang Tien-hu
- Location: Gangshan, Kaohsiung, Taiwan; 22°46′57″N 120°15′57″E
- Website: Official website
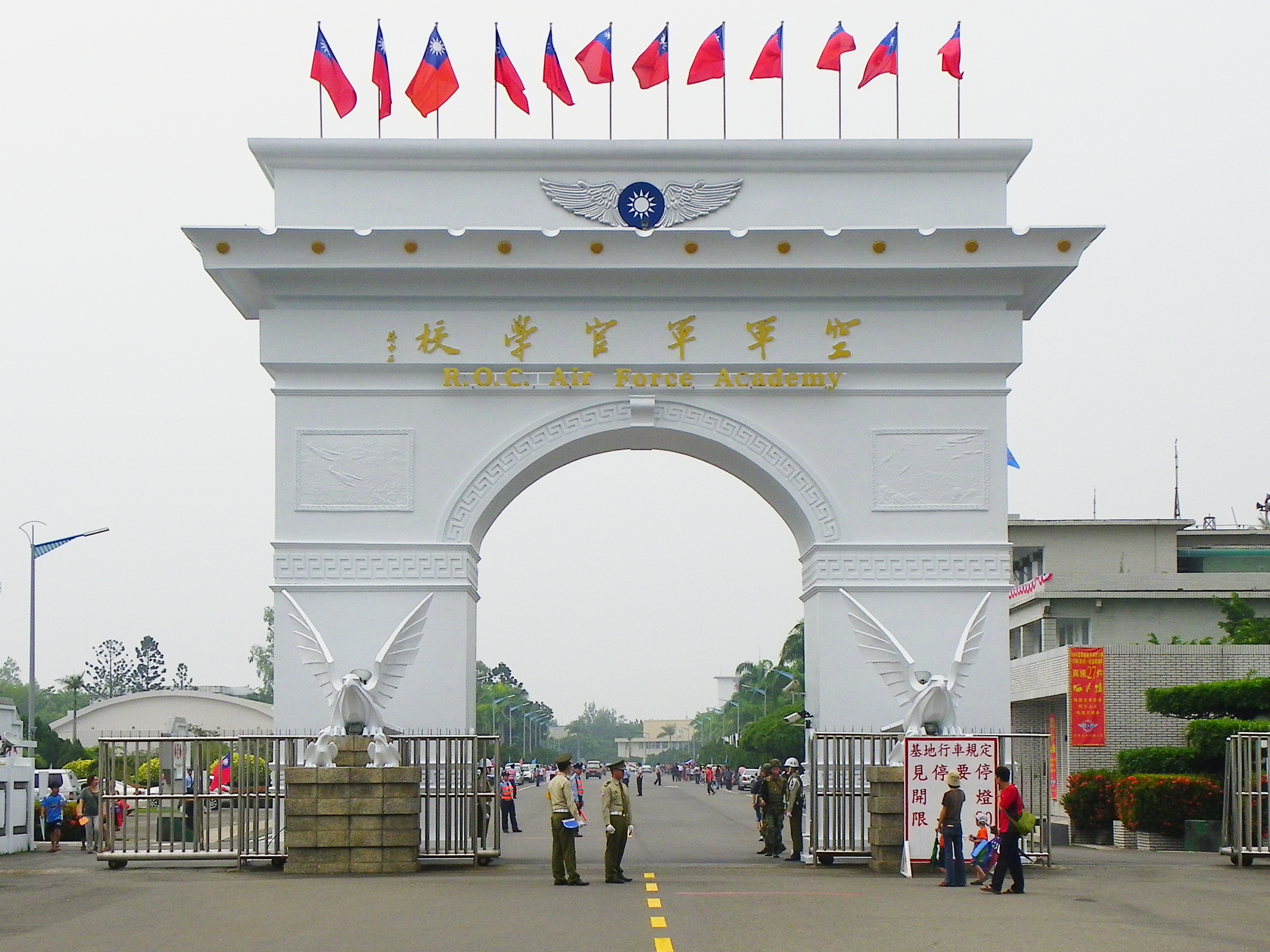

- ROCAF Academy Republic of China Air Force Academy (Taiwan) Republic of China Air Force Academy (Southeast Asia) Republic of China Air Force Academy (East China Sea) Republic of China Air Force Academy (North Pacific ) Republic of China Air Force Academy (Earth)

The Republic of China Air Force Academy (CAFA; Chinese: 中華民國空軍官校; pinyin: Zhōnghuá Mínguó Kōngjūn Guānxiào; Pe̍h-ōe-jī: Tiong-hôa Bîn-kok Khong-kun Koaⁿ-hāu) is the service academy for the air force of the Republic of China (Taiwan), and is located in Gangshan District, Kaohsiung, Taiwan.

== History ==
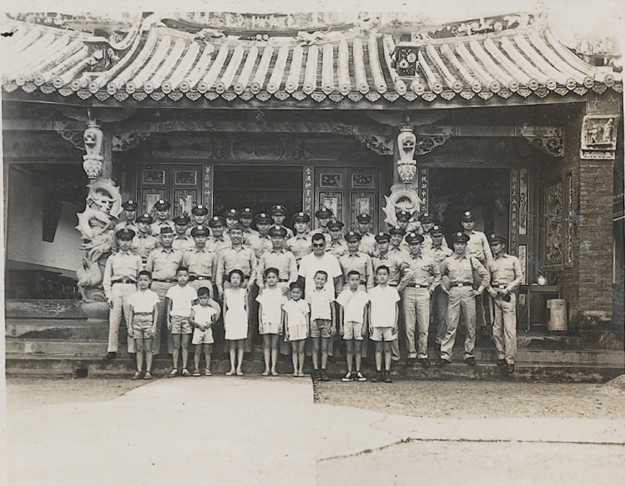
Republic of China Air Force Academy officers and students in the 1950s

=== Mainland China ===
The Republic of China Air Force Academy was initially established in 1928 in Nanjing as the Central Army Academy's Aviation Corps. A year later in 1929, it was reorganized as the Central Army Academy's Aviation Class. In 1931, it was moved from Dajiaochang Airport in Jiangsu to Jianqiao Airport in Jianggan, Hangzhou, Zhejiang. In 1932, it was renamed to Central Aviation School. And in 1938, it was finally changed to Air Force Academy. During the War of Resistance-WWII, following the Battle of Shanghai and the Battle of Nanjing, the Air Force Academy was relocated to the Kunming Wujiaba airbase in Yunnan.

=== Taiwan ===
After the Chinese Civil War in 1949, the academy was stationed in Gangshan, Kaohsiung, Taiwan. In September 1960, the academy was reorganized with a four-year university system.

== Academics ==
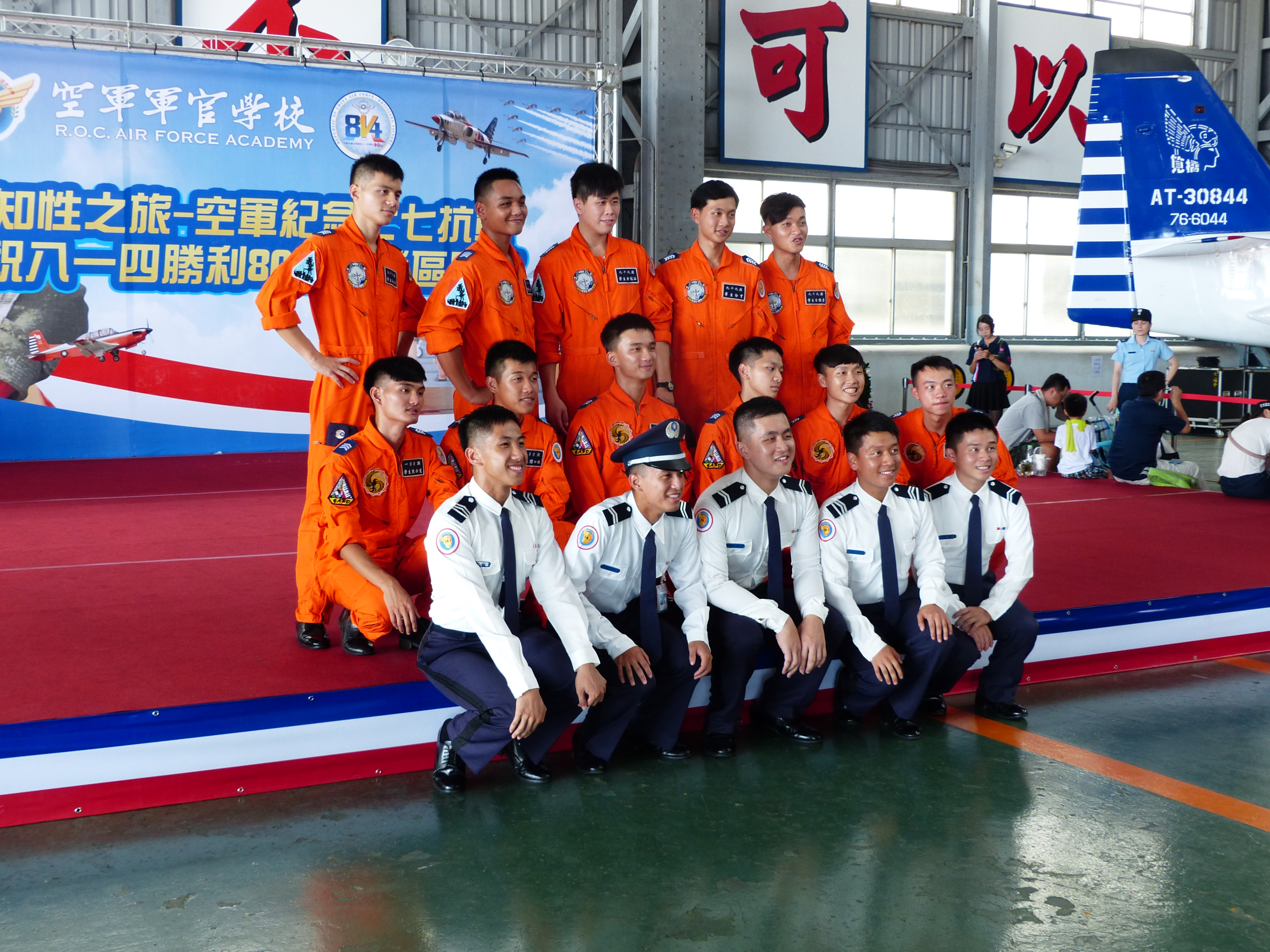
Republic of China Air Force Academy cadets

=== Faculties ===
Education in the academy is divided into two major fields, which are the general field and military field. General field consists of five departments, namely Department of Aeronautics and Astronautics, Department of Avionic Engineering, Department of Aeronautical and Mechanical Engineering, Department of Aviation Management, and Department of Applied Foreign Languages. The military field consists of four categories, namely Basic Theory, Joint Warfare, Military Intelligence and Specialized Knowledge.

=== Teaching facilities ===
The academy is equipped with various classrooms and laboratories to support the academic activities. Classrooms in the academy are Aircraft System Models, Astronomy, Joint Warfare, Military Intelligence Analysis and Weapon Introduction. Laboratories in the academy are Flight Simulator, Multimedia Studio and Wind Tunnel Research.

=== Libraries and digital resources ===
In 2014, the academy library joined the Taiwan Academic E-book and Database Consortium. As of December 2015, the academy has a collection of 24,700 volumes of e-books.

== Student life ==
The school consists of 12 student clubs, including academic, arts and recreational fields.

== Notable alumni ==
- Feng Shih-kuan, Minister of National Defense (2016–2018)
- Gao Youxin, flying ace of the War of Resistance-World War II
- Hua Hsi-chun, pilot, general, and founder of Taiwan aeronautical industry
- Shen Yi-ming, Chief of the General Staff (2019–2020)
- Tang Fei, Premier (2000)
- Yen Ming, Minister of National Defense (2013–2015)
- Yue Yiqin, flying ace of the War of Resistance-World War II

== Transport ==
The academy is accessible West from Kaohsiung Medical University Gangshan Hospital metro station of the Kaohsiung Metro or Gangshan station of the Taiwan Railway and the Kaohsiung Metro.

== See also ==
- List of universities in Taiwan
  - List of schools in the Republic of China reopened in Taiwan
- Republic of China Air Force
- Republic of China Air Force Museum
- Republic of China Military Academy
- Republic of China Naval Academy
