= Yang Kui Literature Memorial Museum =

Museum in Xinhua, Tainan, Taiwan

- 楊逵文學紀念館
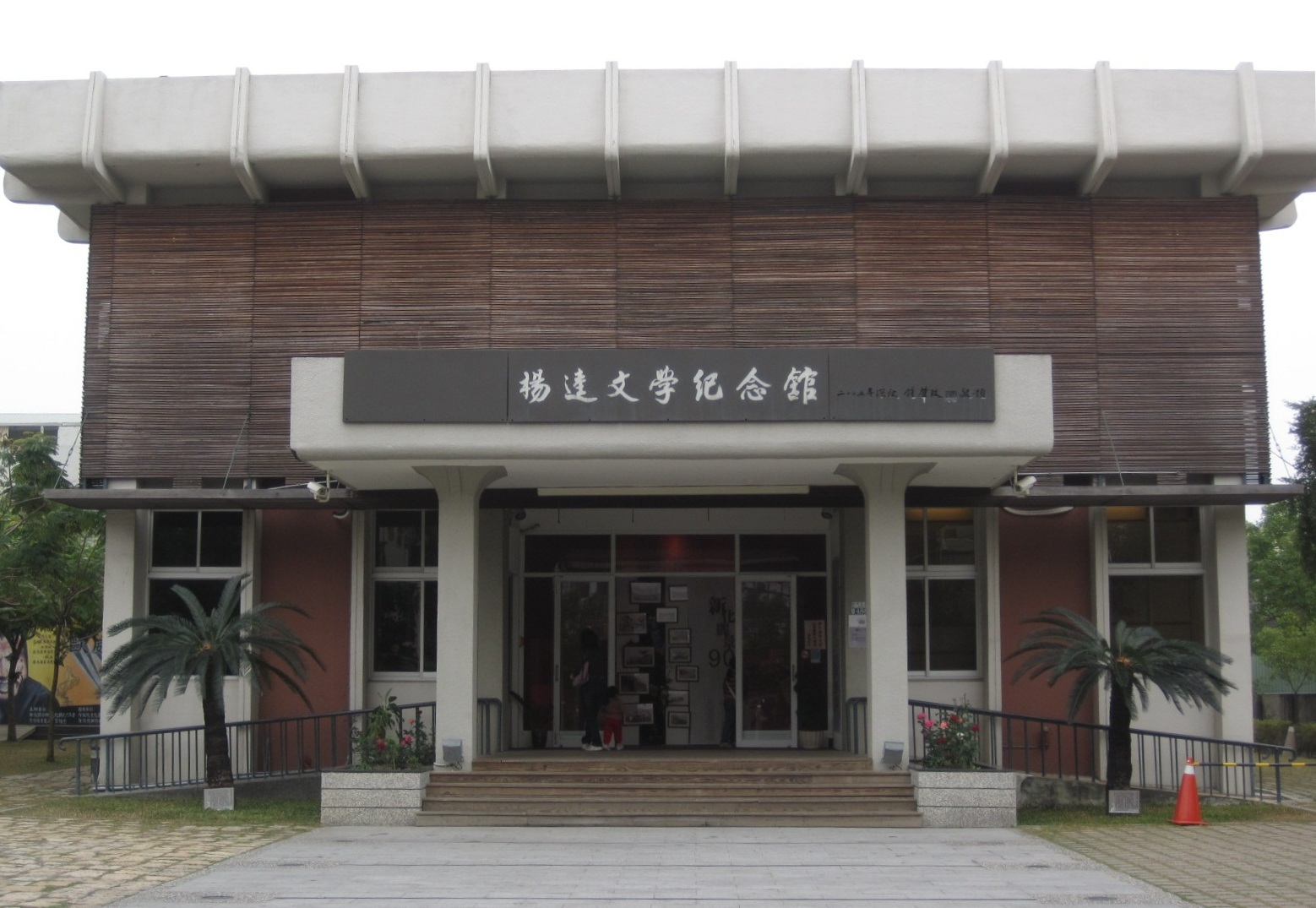
- Established: 27 September 2007
- Location: Xinhua, Tainan, Taiwan
- Coordinates: 23°02′16.4″N 120°18′27.5″E
- Type: museum

The Yang Kui Literature Memorial Museum (traditional Chinese: 楊逵文學紀念館; simplified Chinese: 杨逵文学纪念馆; pinyin: Yángkuí Wénxué Jìniànguǎn) is a museum in Xinhua District, Tainan, Taiwan. The museum is about Taiwan's author Yang Kui and filmmaker Ou Wei.

== History ==
The museum building was originally a local government building. The building was then donated by Tainan County Government in 2002. The museum was then founded on the building on 27 September 2007.

== Architecture ==
The museum consists of two floors which spreads over 3 buildings.

== Exhibition ==
The museum features the photographs, paintings, manuscripts and documents located in a book storehouse and reading room.

== Transportation ==
The museum is accessible by bus from Tainan Station of Taiwan Railway.

== See also ==
- List of museums in Taiwan
