= Kaohsiung Medical University Gangshan Hospital metro station =

Metro station in Kaohsiung, Taiwan

Kaohsiung Medical University Gangshan Hospital R24 岡山高醫
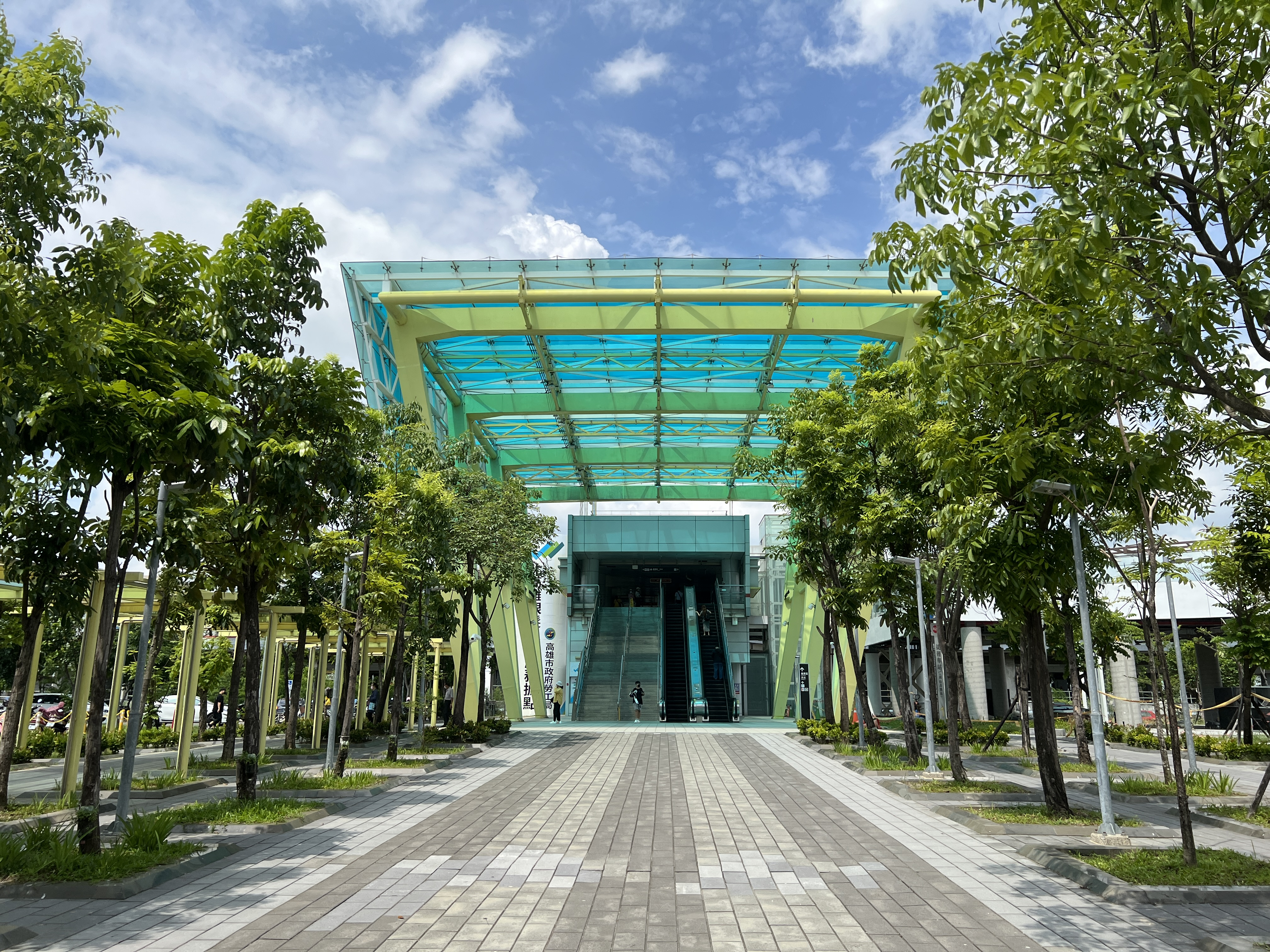

Chinese name
- Traditional Chinese: 岡山高醫站
- Simplified Chinese: 冈山高医站
Transcriptions
Standard Mandarin
- Hanyu Pinyin: Gāngshān Gāoyī Zhàn
- Bopomofo: ㄍㄤ ㄕㄢ ㄍㄠ ㄧ ㄓㄢˋ
- Tongyong Pinyin: Gangshan Gaoyi Jhàn

General information
- Location: Gangshan, Kaohsiung; Taiwan
- Coordinates: 22°46′50″N 120°18′06″E
- Operated by: Kaohsiung Rapid Transit Corporation
- Line: Red line (R24)

Construction
- Structure type: At-grade

History
- Opened: 2012-12-23

Services
Preceding station	Kaohsiung Metro	Following station
Gangshan Terminus	Red line	Ciaotou towards Siaogang
Location

Kaohsiung Medical University Gangshan Hospital is a station on the Red line of Kaohsiung MRT in Gangshan District, Kaohsiung City, Taiwan. Formerly Gangshan South station, it was renamed in 2024 with the extension of the Red line to Gangshan station.

This is an at-grade station. It is located in the KMRT North Depot.

On 30 June 2024, the extension which links it with Gangshan station began operating.

== Around the station ==
- Agongdian River
- Republic of China Air Force Academy
- Republic of China Air Force Museum
- Museum of Shadow Puppets
- Showtime Live Gangshan
- Liucuo Park
- Gangshan Riverside Park
- Dianbao River Wetlands (典寶溪濕地)

== See also ==
- List of railway stations in Taiwan
