= Agongdian Solar PV Park =

Photovoltaic power plant in Yanchao, Kaohsiung, Taiwan

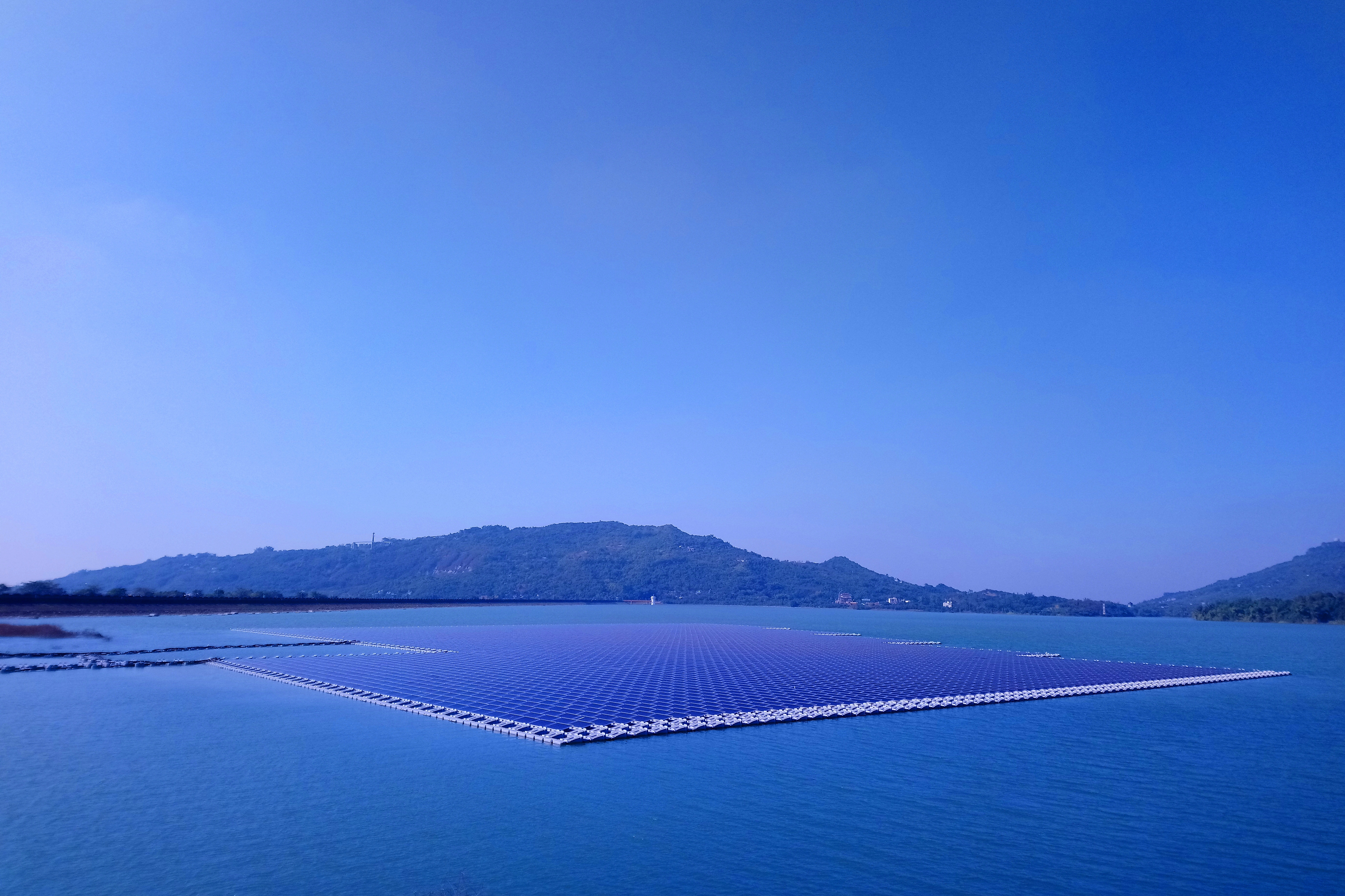
- Official name: 阿公店水庫太陽光電場
- Country: Taiwan
- Location: Yanchao, Kaohsiung
- Coordinates: 22°48′26.1″N 120°21′07.5″E
- Status: Operational
- Commission date: December 2017

Solar farm
- Type: Standard PV

Power generation
- Nameplate capacity: 10.2 MW

External links
- Commons: Related media on Commons

The Agongdian Solar PV Park (traditional Chinese: 阿公店水庫太陽光電場; simplified Chinese: 阿公店水库太阳光电场; pinyin: Āgōngdiàn Shuǐkù Tàiyáng Guāngdiànchǎng) is a floating photovoltaic power plant on Agongdian Reservoir in Yanchao District, Kaohsiung, Taiwan.

== History ==
The power plant was commissioned in December 2017.

== Architecture ==
The power plant spans over an area of 9.2 hectares on Agongdian Reservoir.

== Technical specifications ==
The power plant has an installed generation capacity of 10.2 MW. Each PV modul is rated 290 W.

== See also ==
- List of power stations in Taiwan
