= Gangshan District =

District in Kaohsiung, Taiwan

Coordinates: 22°48′N 120°17′E

Gangshan 岡山區 Okayama
- District
- Gangshan District
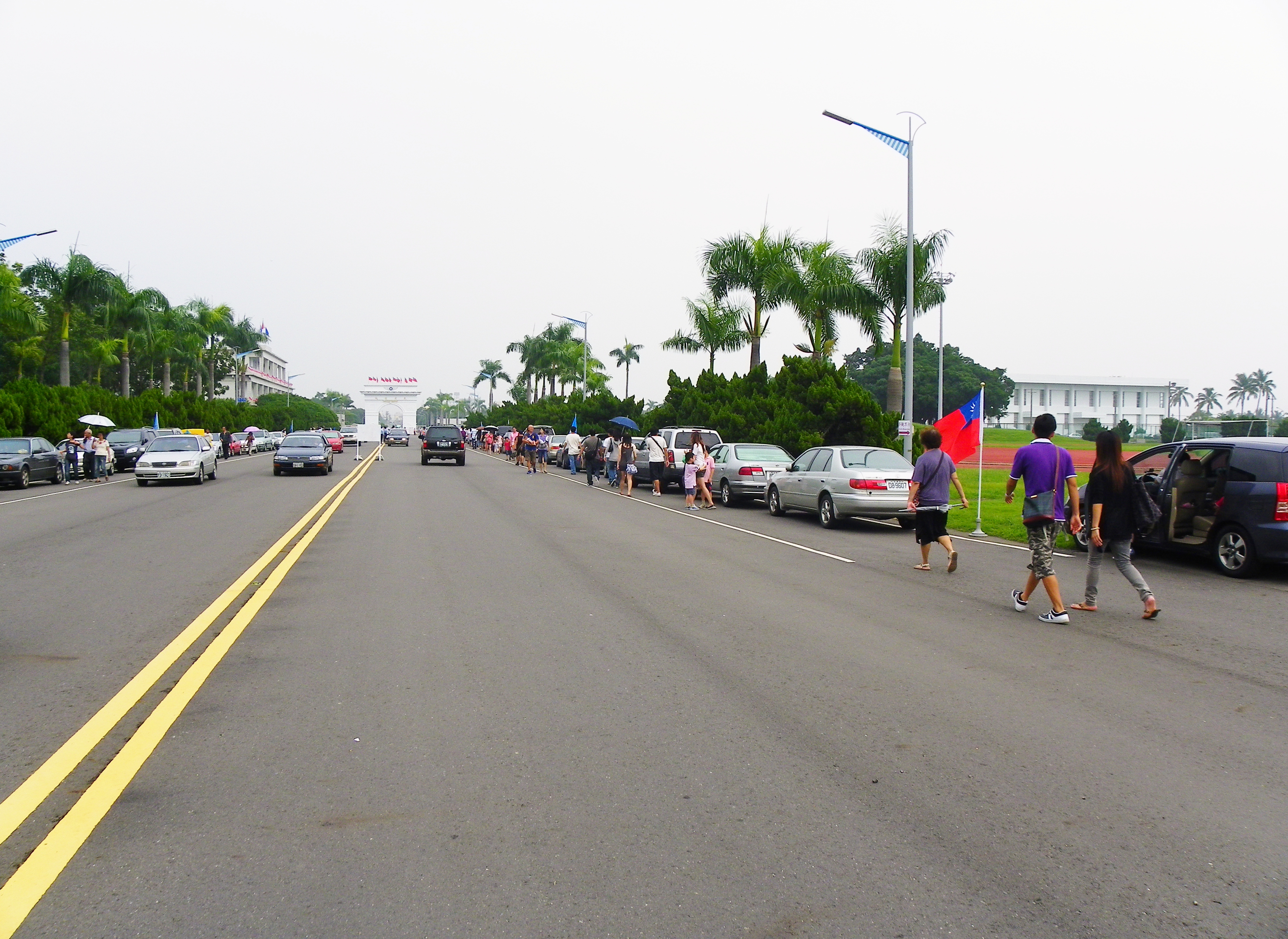
- Gangshan District

- Gangshan District in Kaohsiung City
- Country: Taiwan
- Region: Southern Taiwan

Population (October 2023)
  - Total: 95,532
- Website: gangshan-en.kcg.gov.tw

Gangshan District (Chinese: 岡山區; Hanyu Pinyin: Gāngshān Qū; Tongyong Pinyin: Gangshan Cyu; Wade–Giles: Kang^{1}-shan^{1} Ch'ü^{1}; Pe̍h-ōe-jī: Kong-san-khu, Hakka: Kông-sân-khî), is a suburban district in Kaohsiung City in southern Taiwan. It has 95,532 inhabitants in October 2023.

== History and Names ==
In 1920, during the Japanese era, the town of A-kong-tien (阿公店; Pe̍h-ōe-jī: A-kong-tiàm) was renamed Okayama (岡山) and made the site of an airbase. Administratively Okayama Town covered modern day Gangshan District and Ciaotou District and was under Okayama District, Takao Prefecture. The town suffered heavy bombardment in World War II.

Following the Surrender of Japan and handover to the Kuomintang, the government continued to use the same name (岡山), but transliterated using Mandarin (Gangshan). The town continued to host Gangshan Air Base (Kangshan Air Base), and has a strong military veteran's presence as well.

== Administrative divisions ==
The district consists of Pingan, Gangshan, Shoutian, Weiren, Houhong, Daliao, Zhongxiao, Heping, Qianfeng, Liucuo, Xiehe, Houxie, Xinyi, Tande, Sanhe, Renshou, Bihong, Chengxiang, Zhuwei, Taishang, Wanli, Baimi, Shitan, Fuxing, Benzhou, Jiaxing, Jiafeng, Huagang, Dazhuang, Xierong, Weisui, Shoufeng and Renyi Village.

== Politics ==
The district is part of Kaohsiung City Constituency II electoral district for Legislative Yuan.

== Education ==
- Air Force Institute of Technology
- Republic of China Air Force Academy

== Infrastructures ==
- Agongdian Reservoir
- Gangshan Refuse Incineration Plant

== Tourist attractions ==
Gangshan District is known for restaurants serving goat meat, traditionally goats were raised in northern Kaohsiung because of the poor quality of the land. Due to this the area developed into a center of the regional trade, slaughter, and consumption of goats.

- Agongdian Reservoir
- Gangshan Shoutian Temple
- Gangshan Water Tower
- Kaohsiung Museum of Shadow Puppet
- Republic of China Air Force Museum
- Siaogangshan Skywalk Park
- Soya-Mixed Meat Museum

== Transportation ==
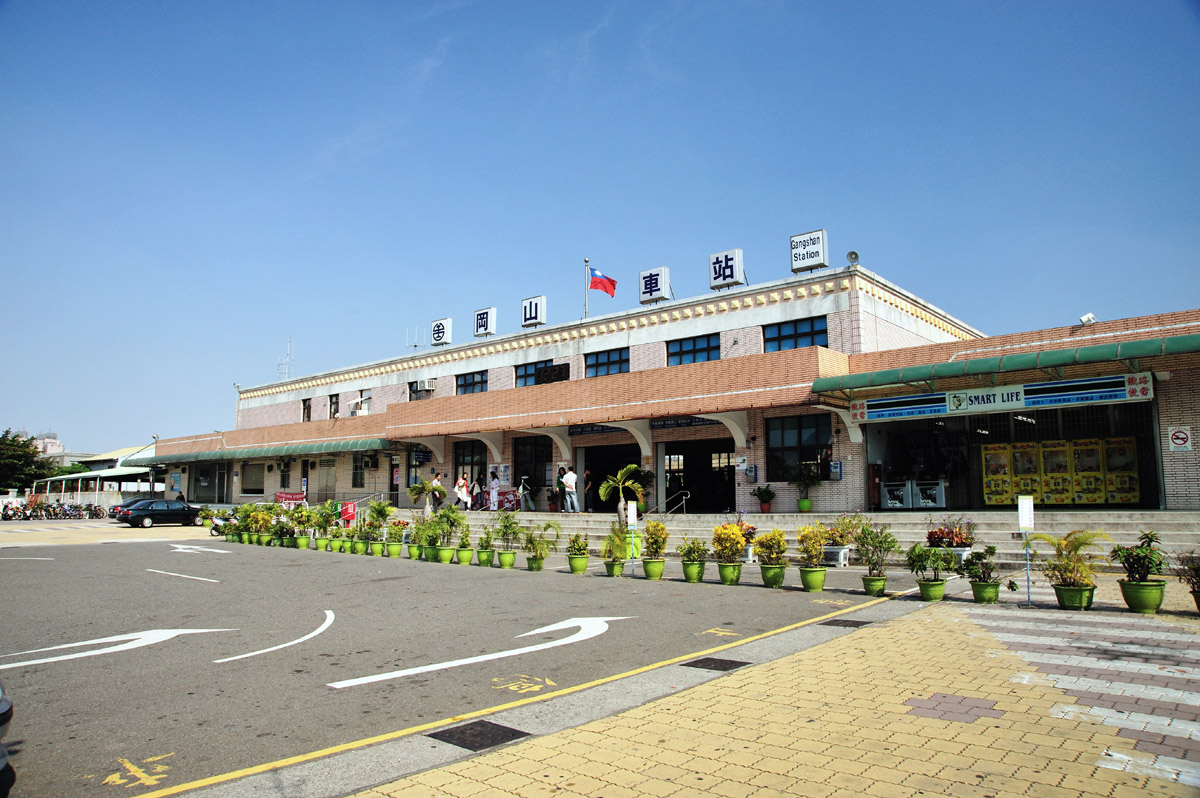
Gangshan station

It is linked to Kaohsiung city center by Kaohsiung Metro's Red line via Kaohsiung Medical University Gangshan Hospital metro station and Gangshan station; the latter is also a station of Taiwan Railway.

== Notable natives ==
- Lee Si-chen, engineer and researcher
- W. P. Andrew Lee, surgeon

== See also ==
- Kaohsiung
- Agongdian River
