= Erren River =

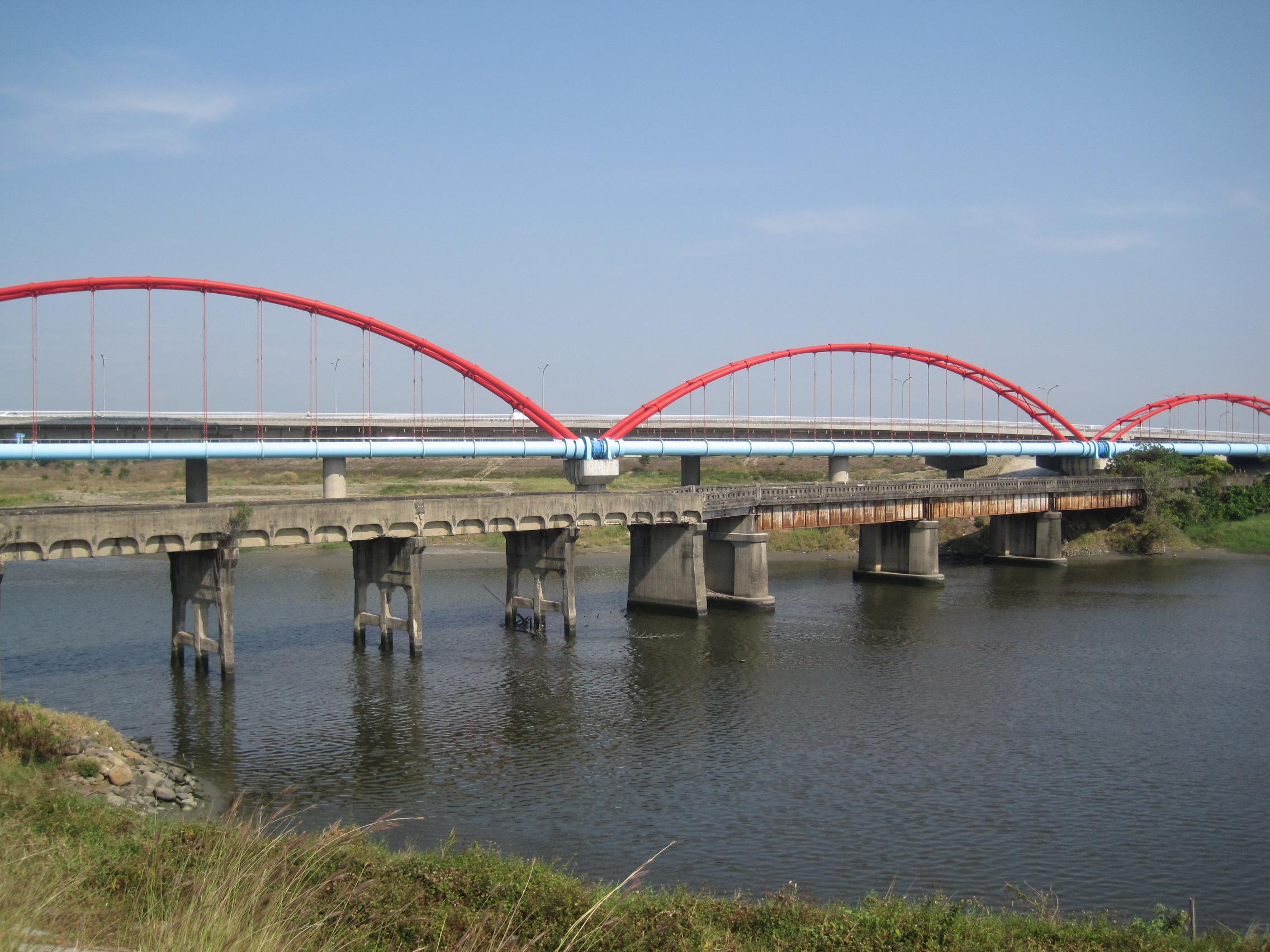

- Erren River in Taiwan

Location
- Country: Taiwan

Physical characteristics
- Mouth
  - location: Taiwan Strait
  - coordinates: 22.913°N 120.176°E
- Length: 61.20 km (38.03 mi)
- Basin size: 339.20 km^{2} (130.97 sq mi)
- Discharge
  - maximum: 3,600 m^{3}/s (130,000 cu ft/s)

The Erren River (Chinese: 二仁溪; pinyin: Èrrén Xī; Wade–Giles: Er^{4}-jen^{2} Hsi^{1}; Pe̍h-ōe-jī: Jī-jîn-khe) is a river in Taiwan. It flows through Tainan City and Kaohsiung City for 61 km. The river originates from the Neimen District in Kaohsiung City and flows through seven districts before it enters Taiwan Strait. The river has suffered from pollution, although the situation has improved.

== See also ==
- List of rivers in Taiwan
