= Agongdian River =

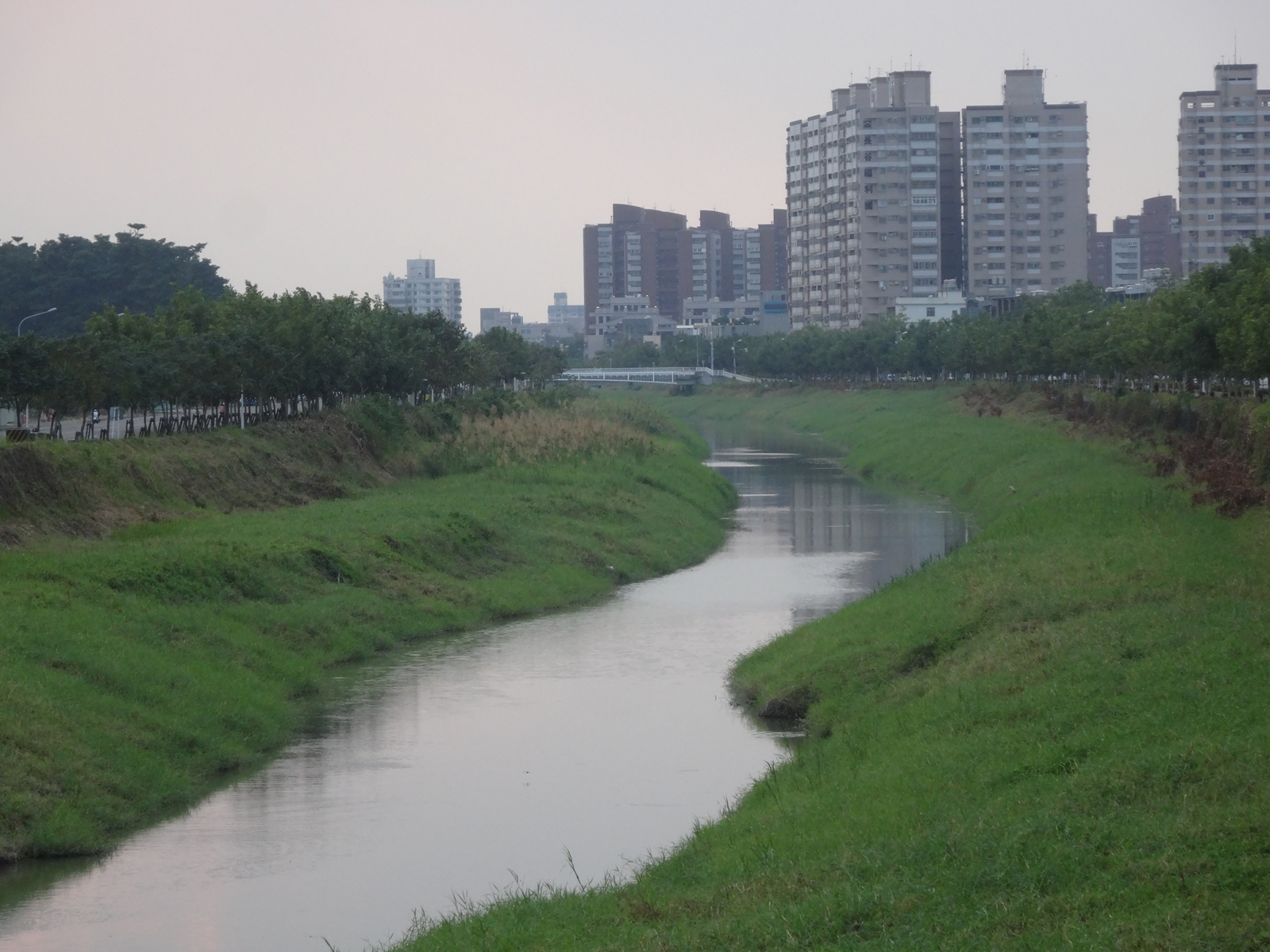
- Native name: 阿公店溪 (Chinese)

Location
- Location: Kaohsiung, Taiwan

Physical characteristics
- Source
  - coordinates: 22°48′38.3″N 120°20′38.2″E
- Mouth
  - coordinates: 22°48′13.2″N 120°12′52.9″E
- Length: 38 km (24 mi)
- Basin size: 137 km^{2}

The Agongdian River (Chinese: 阿公店溪; pinyin: Āgōngdiàn Xī; Pe̍h-ōe-jī: A-kong-tiàm-khe) is a river in Taiwan.

== Name ==
Indigenous people who resided in the area called it Agongtoan. Min Chinese speakers from Fujian changed the pronunciation to "a-kong tiàm" (grandpa's shop), and used it for both Gangshan District, as well as the Agongdian River.

== History ==
Efforts to dam the river began in 1942, when Taiwanese was under Japanese rule. However, flood damage resulted in the suspension of the project, which was completed in 1953. The river now shares its name with the completed reservoir and Agongdian Forest Park.

Residents along the river used to rely on it for agricultural and transportation purposes. From 1949 onwards, the area underwent rapid industrialization and became a major site for screw manufacturing. Agongdian river would gradually become a dumping ground for domestic, agricultural and industrial wastewater, most notably that of the surrounding screw factories, which contains heavy metal such as chromium and zinc. Strong stench emitting from the river is a common phenomenon. In 2012, large amounts of fish were poisoned to death due to pollution, which was then used by nearby residents as animal feed. For several years it was ranked as Taiwan's most polluted river; in February 2012, the Environment Protection Administration revealed that 96% of the river is polluted.

In 2013, the Kaohsiung City Government embarked on a series of short, medium, and long-term plans to clean the river, improve water quality and restore its ecosystem. Its goal is to replicate the success of Love River, another major river that was once also heavily polluted, but now is a tourist attraction.

== Geology ==
The river flows through Kaohsiung for 38 km from Agongdian Reservoir in Yanchao District. The river flows through Gangshan, Yanchao, Alian, Lujhu, Yongan and Mituo District, before finally entering the Taiwan Strait.

== Transportation ==
The river is accessible within walking distance North of Gangshan South Station of Kaohsiung MRT.

== See also ==
- List of rivers in Taiwan
