= Republic of China Air Force Museum =

Museum in Gangshan, Kaohsiung, Taiwan

- 空軍軍史館
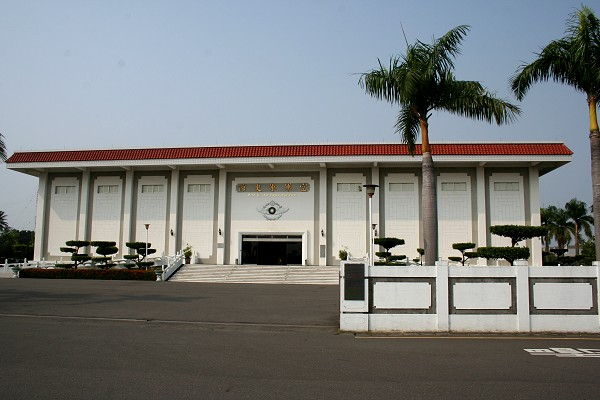
- Established: 14 August 1987
- Location: Gangshan, Kaohsiung, Taiwan
- Coordinates: 22°46′57″N 120°15′57″E
- Type: military museum
- Owner: Republic of China Air Force Academy

The Republic of China Air Force Museum (traditional Chinese: 空軍軍史館; simplified Chinese: 空军军史馆; pinyin: Kōngjūn Jūnshǐguǎn) is an air force open-air museum in Gangshan District, Kaohsiung, Taiwan.

== History ==
The museum building was completed on 14 August 1987 to accommodate the Republic of China Air Force Academy campus planning.

== Exhibitions ==
The overall exhibition area of the museum spans over an area of 3 hectares, which consists of various collections of artifacts, archives, weapons and airplanes.

== See also ==
- List of museums in Taiwan
- Republic of China Air Force
- Republic of China Air Force Academy
- Republic of China Armed Forces Museum
- List of aircraft used in China before 1937
