= Agongdian Reservoir =

Reservoir in Kaohsiung, Taiwan

- 阿公店水庫 (Chinese)
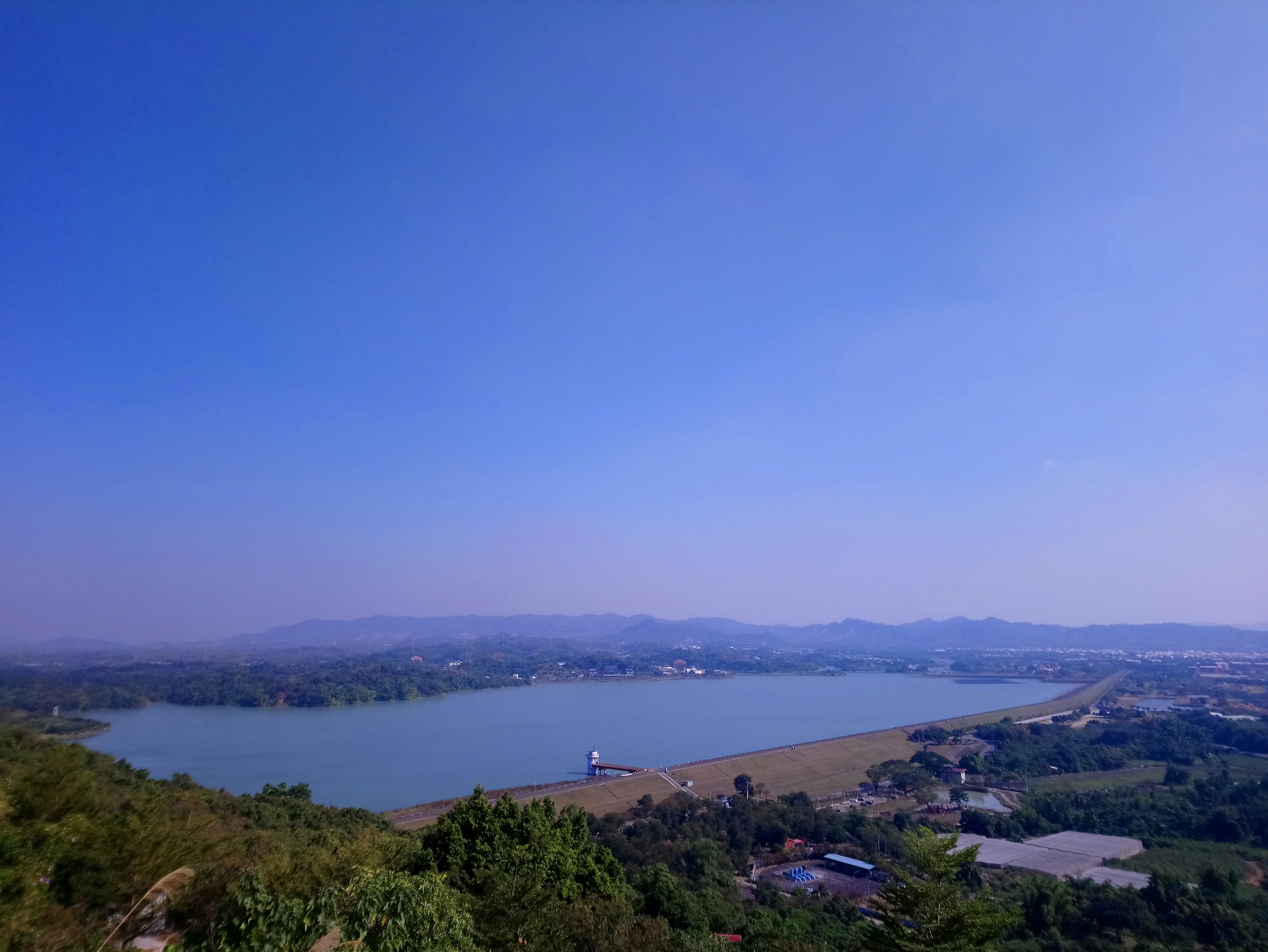

- Location within Kaohsiung
- Location: Gangshan District and Yanchao District, Kaohsiung, Taiwan
- Coordinates: 22°48′44.1″N 120°20′59.7″E
- Type: reservoir
- Primary outflows: Agongdian River
- Catchment area: 31.87 square kilometres (12.31 sq mi)
- Built: 1952
- Max. depth: 40.0 metres (131.2 ft)
- Water volume: 15,275,960 m^{3} (12,384.42 acre⋅ft)

The Agongdian Reservoir (traditional Chinese: 阿公店水庫; simplified Chinese: 阿公店水库; pinyin: Āgōngdiàn Shuǐkù) is a reservoir in Gangshan District and Yanchao District in Kaohsiung, Taiwan.

== History ==
The construction of the reservoir started in 1942. It was completed in 1952. In 1998, the Executive Yuan approved the renovation work for the reservoir. Work commenced in February 2000 by the Southern Branch Office of the Water Resources Agency and was completed in July 2006. The renovation work included conduit spillway reconstruction, water intake tower reconstruction and 116,000,000 m^{3} reservoir dredging. In 2017, the Agongdian Solar PV Park, a floating photovoltaic power plant located on the lake, was commissioned.

== Architecture ==
The reservoir includes a 2.38 km (1.48 mi) long bike path surrounding the water which was established in 2010, becoming the first bike path surrounding a water body in Taiwan. The path connects to ten sightseeing objects around the reservoir.

== Technical specifications ==
The reservoir has a water capacity of 15,275,960 m^{3} and a catchment area of 31.87 km^{2}. It has a maximum depth for flood retention level of 40.0 meters.

== See also ==
- List of dams and reservoirs in Taiwan
