= Gangshan station =

Railway station in Gangshan, Kaohsiung, Taiwan

Gangshan RK1 岡山車站
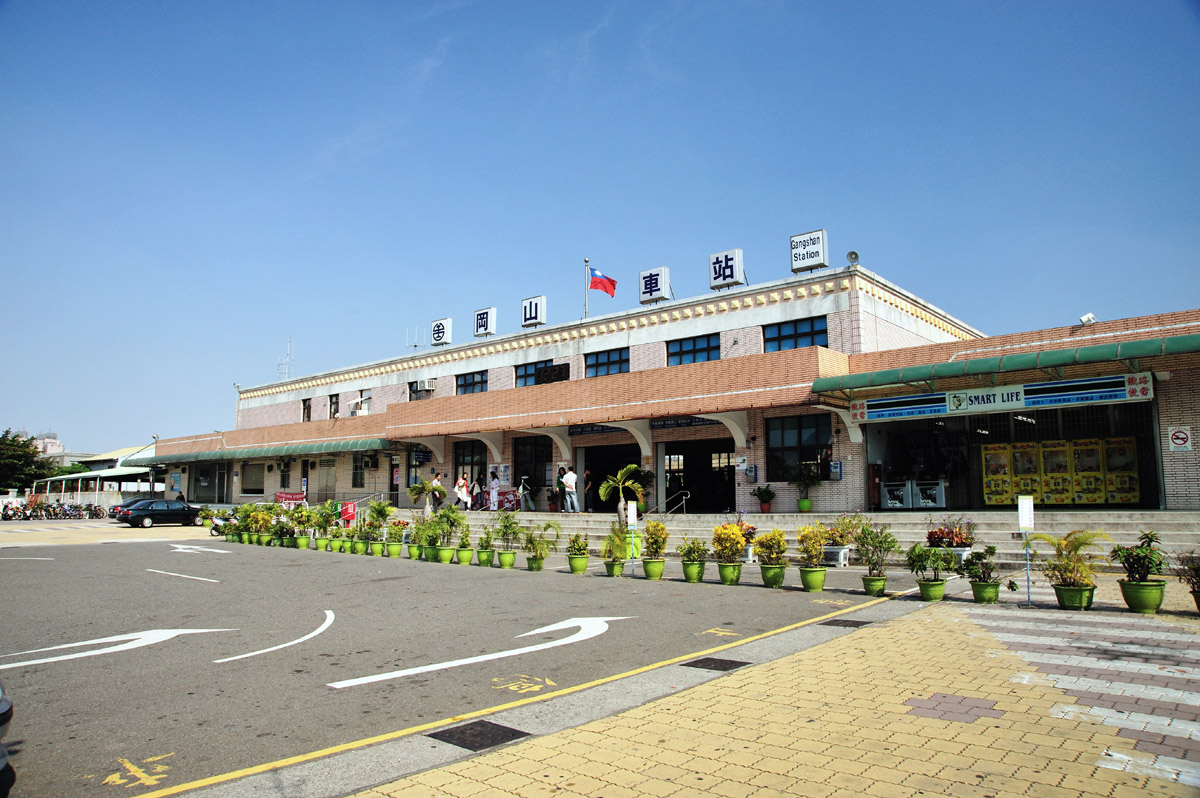
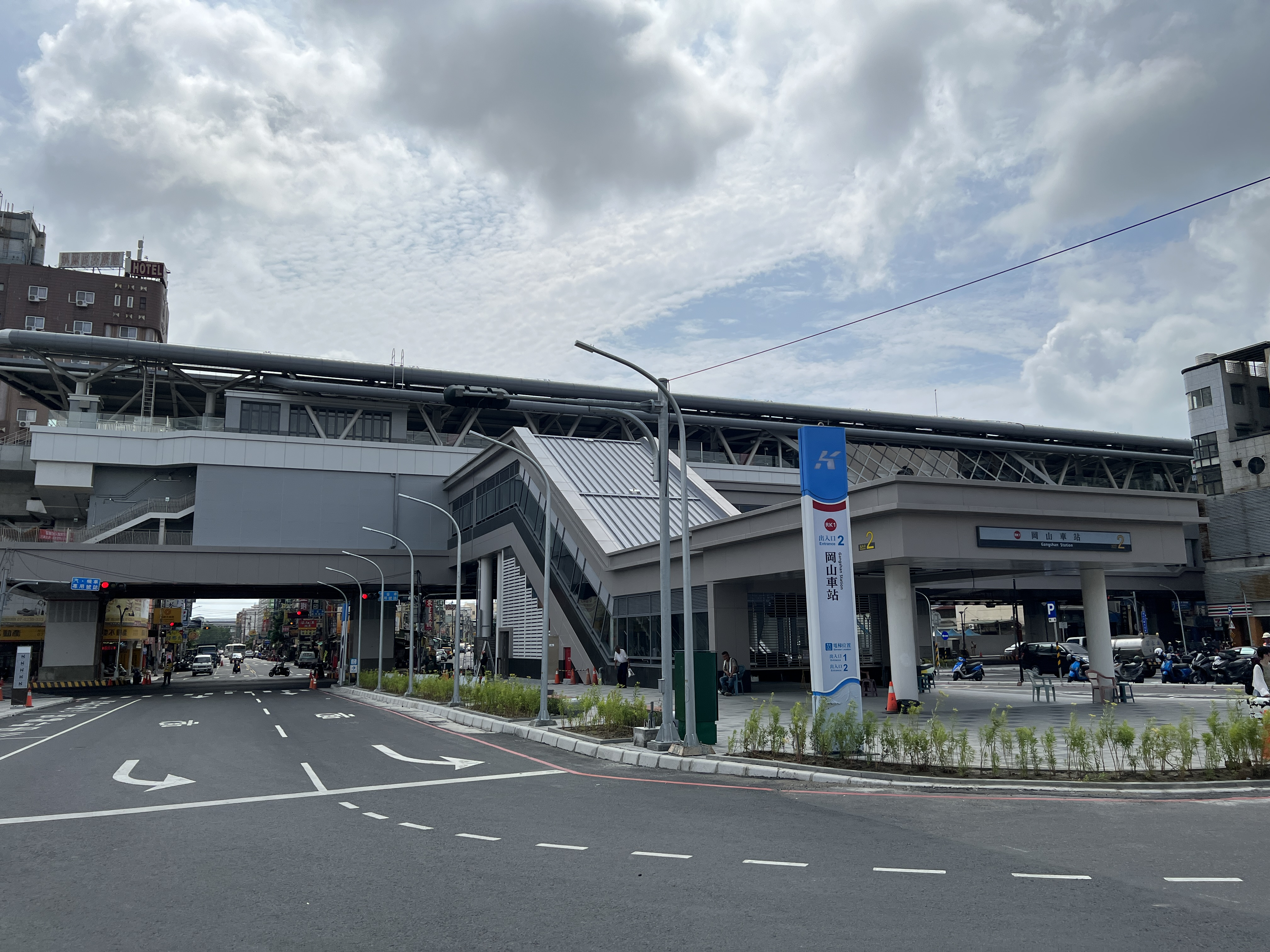
- Gangshan railway station Gangshan metro station

Chinese name
- Traditional Chinese: 岡山車站
- Simplified Chinese: 冈山车站
Transcriptions
Standard Mandarin
- Hanyu Pinyin: Gāngshān Chēzhàn
- Bopomofo: ㄍㄤ ㄕㄢ ㄔㄜ ㄓㄢˋ
- Wade–Giles: Kang^{1}shan^{1}ch'ê^{1}chan^{4}

General information
- Location: Gangshan, Kaohsiung; Taiwan
- Coordinates: 22.792433°N 120.300281°E
- Operated by: Taiwan Railway Corporation; Kaohsiung Rapid Transit Corporation
- Lines: Western Trunk line (180); Red line (RK1)
- Distance: 378.4 km from Keelung
- Platforms: 2 island platform
- Connections: Bus stop

Construction
- Structure type: Surface
- Accessible: Yes

Other information
- Classification: 一等站 (Taiwan Railway level)

History
- Opened: TRA: 15 December 1900 (original); 29 October 1993 (present building); KMRT: 30 June 2024

Passengers
- 5,448 daily (2024)

Services
| Preceding station | Taiwan Railway | Following station |
|---|---|---|
| Luzhu towards Keelung | Western Trunk line | Qiaotou towards Pingtung |
| Preceding station | Kaohsiung Metro | Following station |
| Terminus | Red line | Kaohsiung Medical University Gangshan Hospital towards Siaogang |
Location

Gangshan (Chinese: 岡山車站; pinyin: Gāngshān Chēzhàn) is a first class railway station on the Taiwan Railway West Coast line and a Metro station on the Kaohsiung Metro Red line located in Gangshan District, Kaohsiung, Taiwan.

== History ==
The station was opened on 15 December 1900 as Agongdian Station (阿公店停車場), and was renamed as Okayama Station (岡山駅) in 1920. In November 1923, a second, wooden station building was opened to replace the original 1900 station. The current station building was opened on 29 October 1993, and the 1923 wooden station building burned down on 3 November 1995.

Contactless smartcard fare gates were installed at this station on 30 September 2013.

The Kaohsiung Metro Red line extension which directly links to the train station was opened on 30 June 2024.

== Around the station ==
- Gangshan Water Tower
- Kaohsiung Museum of Shadow Puppet
- Provincial Highway 1
- Republic of China Air Force Academy

== See also ==
- List of railway stations in Taiwan
