= List of schools in Taiwan =

An incomplete list of schools in Taiwan.

== National chains ==
- Hess Educational Organization
- Joy English School

== Changhua ==
- National Changhua Girls' Senior High School, Changhua
- National Changhua Senior High School, Changhua

== Hualien ==
- National Hualien Girls' Senior High School, Hualien City
- National Hualien Senior High School, Hualien City

== Keelung ==
- Keelung Fu Jen Sacred Heart Senior High School, Zhongshan District
- National Keelung Commercial & Industrial Vocational Senior High School, Qidu District
- National Keelung Maritime Vocational High School

== Nantou ==
- The Affiliated Senior High School of National Chi-Nan University, Puli
- National Caotun Commercial & Industrial Vocational Senior High School, Caotun
- Taiwan Adventist International School

== New Taipei City ==
- Hsing Wu High School, Linkou District
- Kang Chiao International School, Xindian District
- New Taipei Industrial Vocational High School, Tucheng District
- New Taipei Municipal An Kang High School, Xindian District
- New Taipei Municipal Banqiao Senior High School, Banqiao District
- New Taipei Municipal DanFeng High School, Xinzhuang District
- New Taipei Municipal Hsin Tien Senior High School, Xindian District
- New Taipei Municipal Hsinchuang Senior High School, Xinzhuang District
- New Taipei Municipal Jui-Fang Industrial High School, Ruifang District
- New Taipei Municipal Lin-kou High School, Linkou District
- New Taipei Municipal New Taipei Senior High School, Sanchong District
- New Taipei Municipal SanChong High School, Sanchong District
- New Taipei Municipal San-Chung Commercial and Industrial Vocational High School, Sanchong District
- New Taipei Municipal Sanzhi Junior High School, Sanzhi District
- New Taipei Municipal ShiDing High School, Shiding District
- New Taipei Municipal Tam-Shui Vocational High School, Tamsui District
- New Taipei Municipal Yingge Vocational High School, Yingge District
- New Taipei Municipal Zhuwei High School, Tamsui District
- Private NanShan Senior High School, Zhonghe District
- Sacred Heart Girls High School (Taiwan), Bali District
- Tamshui Junior High School, Tamsui District
- Tsz-Shiou Senior High School
- Yung-Ping High School, Yonghe District

== Hsinchu ==
- Hsinchu American School, East District
- Hsinchu International School, Xiangshan District
- Hsinchu Kuang-Fu Senior High School, East District
- Hsinchu Municipal Ximen Elementary school, North District
- Hsinchu Pei Ying Junior High School, East District
- International Bilingual School at Hsinchu Science Park, Hsinchu Science Park
- National Hsinchu Girls' Senior High School, East District
- National Hsinchu Senior High School, East District
- Pacific American School, Zhubei
- Sagor Bilingual School, Hsinchu City
- Stanford American Language Institution, Hsinchu City

== Taichung ==
- The Affiliated Senior High School of National Chung Hsing University, Dali District
- American School in Taichung
- Ivy Collegiate Academy, Tanzi District
- Mingdao High School, Wuri District
- Morrison Academy, Beitun District
- National Wen-Hua Senior High School, Xitun District
- Taichung Japanese School, Daya District
- Taichung Municipal Cingshuei Senior High School, Qingshui District
- Taichung Municipal Taichung First Senior High School, North District
- Taichung Municipal Taichung Industrial High School, South District
- Taichung Municipal Taichung Second Senior High School, Taichung City

== Tainan ==
- Kuen Shan Senior High School
- National Hsin-Feng Senior High School, Gueiren District
- National Pei Men Senior High School, Jiali District
- National Tainan First Senior High School, East District
- National Tainan Girls' Senior High School, West Central District
- National Tainan Second Senior High School, North District
- National Nanke International Experimental High School, Sinshih District
- Sheng Kung Girls' High School, North District

== Taoyuan ==
- The Affiliated Jhongli Senior High School of National Central University, Zhongli District
- National Neili Senior High School, Zhongli District
- Taoyuan American School, Luzhu District
- Taoyuan Municipal Nankan Senior High School, Luzhu District
- Wu-Ling Senior High School, Taoyuan
- Yung-Feng High School, Bade District

== Kaohsiung ==
- Affiliated Senior High School of National Kaohsiung Normal University, Lingya District
- Chung Shan Industrial and Commercial School, Daliao District
- Guoguang Laboratory School, National Sun Yat-sen University, Nanzih District
- I-Shou International School, Dashu District
- Kaohsiung American School, Zuoying District
- Kaohsiung Japanese School, Lingya District
- Kaohsiung Municipal Hsin Chuang High School, Zuoying District
- Kaohsiung Municipal Jhong-Jheng Senior High School, Lingya District
- Kaohsiung Municipal Kaohsiung Girls' Senior High School, Cianjin District
- Kaohsiung Municipal Kaohsiung Senior High School, Sanmin District
- Kaohsiung Municipal Nanzih Comprehensive Senior High School, Nanzih District
- Kaohsiung Municipal Ruei-Siang Senior High School, Cianjhen District
- Kaohsiung Municipal Sanmin Senior High School, Sanmin District
- Kaohsiung Municipal Tsoying Senior High School, Zuoying District
- Morrison Academy Kaohsiung, Dashe District
- National FengHsin Senior High School, Fongshan District
- National Fengshan Senior High School, Fongshan District
- National FongShan Senior Commercial & Industrial Vocational School, Fongshan
- Pu-Men High School, Dashu District

== Pingtung ==
- National Chao-Chou Senior High School, Chaozhou
- National Pingtung Senior High School, Pingtung City

== Yilan ==
- National Yilan Senior High School, Yilan City

== Yunlin ==
- National Huwei Senior High School, Huwei Township
- Tuku Junior High School, Tuku

== See also ==
- Education in Taiwan
- List of law schools in Taiwan
- List of universities in Taiwan
