= List of educational institutions in Taichung =

Taichung educational institutions are in Taichung city of Taiwan. They include bilingual kindergartens through elementary and secondary education onto all forms of tertiary education. There are international schools to serve foreigners in the city as well as a handful of language institutes for foreigners to study Mandarin and Taiwanese.

== Higher education ==
=== Universities ===
Universities offer four-year programs in a variety of subjects. Taichung possesses both public and private universities.

==== Public universities ====
- National Chung Hsing University (國立中興大學) – located in the southern part of the city of Taichung, Taiwan. With over 17,000 students, NCHU has seven colleges and a department of continuing education.
- National Taichung University of Science and Technology (國立台中科技大學) –formerly known as National Taichung Institute of Technology (NTIT, Chinese: 國立台中技術學院) and National Taichung Nursing College (NTNC, Chinese: 國立台中護理專科學校), merged in 2011 to form the new institution. There are five colleges of NTUST: Business, Design, Languages and Language Applications, Information and Distribution Science, and Health. The university is located on two campuses in the heart of the city: the primary campus is near Yizhong Street (一中街), National Taichung First Senior High School and the National Taiwan University of Physical Education and Sports, while the secondary campus is located about 2 kilometers down Sanmin Road, near Taichung Hospital.
- National Taichung University of Education (國立臺中教育大學) – formerly known as National Taichung Teacher's College (NTTC, Chinese: 國立台中師範學院), is located in the West District of the city. It is the premier teacher training school in the city, training future teachers in all areas from early childhood to secondary education, including a research center for special education.
- National Taiwan University of Sport (國立臺灣體育運動大學) – located in the North District. It is the top physical education university in Taiwan and also home to Taichung Baseball Field and the local soccer stadium.

==== Private universities ====
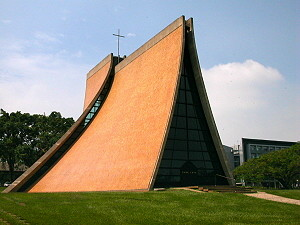
The Luce Memorial Chapel at Tunghai University.

- Feng Chia University (逢甲大學) – Feng Chia University was named after Chiu Feng-Chia. The main campus is located in Xitun District.
- Tunghai University (東海大學) – Tunghai University is a university in Xitun District near Longjing Township.
- Providence University (靜宜大學) – Providence University is a Catholic co-educational institution in Shalu District, Taichung City, Taiwan.
- China Medical University (中國醫藥大學) – China Medical University is one of two large medical universities in the city. It also has a full-service training hospital adjacent to the university.
- Chung Shan Medical University (中山醫學大學) – Chung Shan Medical University is another large medical university, this one on the southern part of the city.
- Asia University (亞洲大學) – Asia University is a private university in Taichung, Taiwan. Founded in 2001, it offers education for degrees in health and medical science, computer science and electrical engineering, creative design, management, and humanities and social sciences.
- Chaoyang University of Technology (朝陽科技大學) – Chaoyang University of Technology is a university in Wufeng District, Taichung, Taiwan. Founded in 1994, originally named Chaoyang Institute of Technology, and granted university status in 1997.
- Hungkuang University (弘光科技大學) – Hungkuang University is a private university located in Shalu District, Taichung, Taiwan.
- Ling Tung University (嶺東科技大學) – Located in Nantun District, the university offers design and business programs.
- Central Taiwan University of Science and Technology (中台科技大學) – Located in the mountains of Dakeng, CTU has four colleges: Health Sciences, Nursing, Management, and Humanities and Social Sciences. It was upgraded to university status in 2005 and is best known for its nursing and health sciences programs.
- Overseas Chinese University (僑光科技大學) – Overseas Chinese University is a private university in Xitun District, Taichung, Taiwan. It was founded in 1964 by the Hsin Tien Kong Educational Foundation, and was originally called the Overseas Chinese Junior College.
- Hsiuping University of Science and Technology (修平科技大學) – Hsiuping University of Science and Technology is a private university in Dali District, Taichung, Taiwan.

== Secondary education ==
=== Senior High Schools ===
Senior High Schools are the next level of education for students who have completed their mandatory nine years of primary and lower secondary education. Admittance is based on performance in a national standardized examination that is administered annually. These schools are typically college preparatory, and graduates are expected to go on to pursue a four-year university education.

In Taichung, some of the most prestigious senior high schools include Taichung First Senior High School (established in 1915), Taichung Girls' Senior High School (founded in 1919), and Taichung Second Senior High School (established in 1922). Taichung First Senior High School is an all-boys school with a small number of female students admitted to special programs. Taichung Second Senior High School now accepts both boys and girls.

In general, public high schools in Taichung are considered more desirable due to their lower tuition and greater resources. However, there are also several excellent private high schools in the city. Some of these schools also offer vocational programs as well as junior high school education.

High Schools
| English name | Chinese | District | Type | Website | Founded |
|---|---|---|---|---|---|
| Taichung Municipal Taichung First Senior High School | 臺中市立臺中第一高級中等學校 | | Municipal | Chinese | 1915 |
| Taichung Municipal Taichung Second Senior High School | 臺中市立臺中第二高級中等學校 | | Municipal | Chinese | 1922 |
| Taichung Municipal Taichung Girls' Senior High School | 臺中市立臺中女子高級中等學校 | | Municipal | Chinese English | 1919 |
| Taichung Municipal Wen-Hua Senior High School | 臺中市立文華高級中等學校 | | Municipal | Chinese English | 1989 |
| Taichung Municipal Cingshuei Senior High School | 臺中市立清水高級中等學校 | | Municipal | Chinese | 1946 |
| Taichung Municipal Chungming Senior High School | 臺中市立忠明高級中學 | | Municipal | Chinese | 1957 |
| Taichung Municipal Shiyuan Senior High School | 臺中市立西苑高級中學 | | Municipal | Chinese | |
| Taichung Municipal Huiwen High School | 臺中市立惠文高級中學 | | Municipal | English | 2001 |
| Stella Matutina Girls' High School | 曉明女子高級中學 | | Private | Chinese English | 1966 |
| Viator Senior High School | 衛道高級中學 | | Private | Chinese | |
| I-ning Senior High School | 宜寧高級中學 | | Private | Chinese | |
| Ming-Der Girls High School | 明德女子高級中學 | | Private | Chinese | |
| The Affiliated High School of Tunghai University | 東海大學附屬高級中學 | | Private | Chinese | |
| Shinmin High School | 新民高級中學 | | Private | Chinese | |
| Ling-tung High School | 嶺東高級中學 | | Private | Chinese | |
| Hong Wen International School | 弘文國際素養課程 | | Private | English | |

=== Vocational High Schools ===
Taiwan also offers students the opportunity to study specific trades as opposed to going to a general high school. Some vocational programs are highly academic (i.e. language programs) while others focus on preparing students for a job after graduation.

- National Taichung Home Economics and Commercial High School (國立台中高級家事商業職業學校)
- National Taichung Agricultural Senior High School (國立台中高級農業職業學校)
- National Taichung Industrial High School (國立台中高級工業職業學校)
- Kuang-Hwa Vocational High School of Technology (光華高級工業職業學校)

=== Special Secondary Schools ===
Taichung also offers special schools for deaf as well as those who have other learning impairments.

- National Taichung School for the Deaf (台中啟聰學校)
- National Taichung Special Education School (台中特殊教育學校)

=== Junior high schools ===
Junior High School covers grades seven through nine and mark the culmination of mandatory education in Taiwan. Taichung offers a full range of public and private junior high schools.

Junior High Schools
| English name | Chinese | District | Type | Website | Founded |
|---|---|---|---|---|---|
| Chu Jen Junior High School | 居仁國中 | West | Municipal | Chinese English | 1946 |
| Shang Shih Junior High School | 雙十國中 | North | Municipal | Chinese English | 1954 |
| Cheng Kong Junior High School | 成功國中 | Dali | Municipal | Chinese | 1983 |
| Kuang Rong Junior High School | 光榮國中 | Dali | Municipal | Chinese | 1990 |
| Chung Ming Senior High School (Junior High School Division) | 忠明高中國中部 | | Municipal | Chinese | |
| Chung Lun Junior High School | 崇倫國中 | South | Municipal | Chinese English | 1961 |
| Da-De Junior High School | 大德國中 | Beitun | Municipal | Chinese English | 1963 |
| Pei Hsin Junior High School | 北新國中 | Beitun | Municipal | Chinese English | 1964 |
| Tong Feng Junior High School | 東峰國中 | East | Municipal | Chinese English | 1966 |
| Li Ming Junior High School | 黎明國中 | | Municipal | Chinese | |
| Kuang Ming Junior High School | 光明國中 | West | Municipal | Chinese | 1968 |
| Siang Shang Junior High School | 向上國中 | West | Municipal | Chinese English | 1968 |
| Yu Ying Junior High School | 育英國中 | East | Municipal | Chinese English | 1968 |
| Sz Yu Junior High School | 四育國中 | South | Municipal | Chinese English | 1969 |
| Shi Yuan Senior High School (Junior High School Division) | 西苑高中國中部 | | Municipal | Chinese | |
| Wu Chuan Junior High School | 五權國中 | North | Municipal | Chinese | 1970 |
| Dong Shan Junior High School | 東山國中 | | Municipal | English | |
| Chong Teh Junior Junior High School | 崇德國中 | Beitun | Municipal | Chinese English | 1988 |
| Li Jen Junior High School | 立人國中 | North | Municipal | Chinese English | 1992 |
| Han Kou Junior High School | 漢口國中 | Xitun | Municipal | Chinese English | 1991 |
| An Her Junior High School | 安和國中 | Xitun | Municipal | Chinese English | 1993 |
| Chih Shan Junior High School | 至善國中 | Xitun | Municipal | Chinese English | 1993 |
| Chung Shan Junior High School | 中山國中 | Xitun | Municipal | Chinese | 1983 |
| Wan Ho Junior High School | 萬和國中 | | Municipal | English | |
| Dayeh Junior High School | 大業國中 | | Municipal | English | |
| San Guang Junior High School | 三光國中 | Beitun | Municipal | Chinese English | 1995 |
| Suu Chang Li Junior High School | 四張犁國中 | Beitun | Municipal | Chinese English | 2000 |
| Hui Wen Senior High School (Junior High School Division) | 惠文高中國中部 | | Municipal | Chinese | |
| I-Ning Senior High School (Junior High School Division) | 宜寧高中國中部 | | Private | Chinese | |
| Viator High School (Junior High School Division) | 衛道高中國中部 | | Private | Chinese | |
| Stella Matutina Girls High School (Junior High School Division) | 曉明女中國中部 | | Private | Chinese | |
| Tunghai University Affiliated High School (Junior High School Division) | 東海大學附屬高中國中部 | | Private | Chinese | |
| Shin Min High School (Junior High School Division) | 新民高中國中部 | | Private | Chinese | |
| Ming Dao High School (Junior High School Division) | 明道中學國中部 | | Private | Chinese | |
| Wagor Educational System (Junior High School Division) | 葳格國中小 | | Private | Chinese | |
| Ling Tung Senior High School (Junior High School Division) | 嶺東高中國中部 | | Private | Chinese | |

== Primary education ==
Elementary school encompasses grades one through six. Typically, students will attend a public school in the zone designated for where ones residence is registered, not where one actually lives.

Public Elementary Schools
| English name | Chinese | Website | Founded |
|---|---|---|---|
| Guangfu Elementary School | 光復國小 | Chinese | |
| Jinde Elementary School | 進德國小 | Chinese | |
| Leye Elementary School | 樂業國小 | | |
| Dazhi Elementary School | 大智國小 | Chinese | |
| Taichung Elementary School | 台中國小 | Chinese | |
| Lising Elementary School | 力行國小 | English | |
| Chungkung Elementary School | 成功國小 | Chinese | |
| Kuo-kuang Elementary School | 國光國小 | Chinese | |
| Heping Elementary School | 和平國小 | Chinese | |
| Shuye Elementary School | 樹義國小 | Chinese | |
| Xinyi Elementary School | 信義國小 | Chinese | |
| Da-yuan Elementary School | 大勇國小 | Chinese | |
| Chung Ming Elementary School | 忠明國小 | Chinese | |
| Jhong Siao Elementary School | 忠孝國小 | Chinese | |
| Datong Elementary School | 大同國小 | Chinese | |
| Taichung Municipal Chung-Cheng Elementary School | 中正國小 | Chinese | |
| Chung-shin Elementary School | 忠信國小 | Chinese English | |
| Lai-Cuo Elementary School | 賴厝國小 | Chinese | |
| Li Ren Elementary School | 立人國小 | Chinese | |
| Jhonghua Elementary School | 中華國小 | Chinese | |
| Tai-Ping Elementary School | 太平國小 | Chinese | |
| Provincial Number Three Elementary School | 省三國小 | Chinese | |
| Jian-Xing Elementary School | 健行國小 | Chinese | |
| Du-Xing Elementary School | 篤行國小 | Chinese | |
| Qiaoxiao Elementary School | 僑孝國小 | Chinese | |
| Guang-Zheng Elementary School | 光正國小 | English | |
| Jien-Kong Elementary School | 建功國小 | English | |
| Suu-Chang-Li Elementary School | 四張犁國小 | Chinese | |
| Bei Tun Elementary School | 北屯國小 | Chinese | |
| Jyun Gong Elementary School | 軍功國小 | Chinese | |
| Taichung Municipal Sihwei Elementary School | 四維國小 | Chinese | |
| Dung-Guang Elementary School | 東光國小 | English | |
| Taichung Municipal Jen Mei Elementary School | 仁美國小 | English | |
| Chengpeng Elementary School | 陳平國小 | Chinese | |
| Wenxin Elementary School | 文心國小 | | |
| Wun Chang Elementary School | 文昌國小 | English | |
| Song Jhu Elementary School | 松竹國小 | English | |
| Ren Ai Elementary School | 仁愛國小 | Chinese | |
| Shang An Elementary School | 上安國小 | Chinese | |
| Chongcing Elementary School | 重慶國小 | English | |
| Taichung Municipal Sie He Elementary School | 協和國小 | Chinese | |
| Da Ren Elementary School | 大仁國小 | Chinese | |
| Da Peng Elementary School | 大鵬國小 | Chinese | |
| Tai An Elementary School | 泰安國小 | Chinese | |
| Yong An Elementary School | 永安國小 | Chinese | |
| Situn Elementary School | 西屯國小 | English | |
| He Cuo Elementary School | 何厝國小 | Chinese | |
| Guo An Elementary School | 國安國小 | Chinese | |
| Shang Shih Elementary School | 上石國小 | Chinese | |
| Chun An Elementary School | 春安國小 | Chinese | |
| Li Ming Elementary School | 黎明國小 | Chinese | |
| Dong Sing Elementary School | 東興國小 | Chinese | |
| Zheng Ping Elementary School | 鎮平國小 | English | |
| Yong Chun Elementary School | 永春國小 | | |
| Nan Tun Elementary School | 南屯國小 | Chinese | |
| Wen Shan Elementary School | 文山國小 | Chinese | |
| Da-Shin Elementary School | 大新國小 | English | |
| Taichung Municipal Hui Wen Elementary School | 惠文國小 | English | |
| Xin Xing Elementary School | 新興國小 | English | |
| Feng Jia Elementary School | 逢甲國小 | English | |

Private Elementary Schools
| English name | Chinese | Website | Founded |
|---|---|---|---|
| Washington Bilingual Elementary School | 華盛頓雙語小學 | Chinese | |
| Ming-Dao Future Heir Bilingual Elementary School | 明道普霖斯頓雙語小學 | Chinese | |
| The Affiliated Experimental Elementary School of National Taichung University | 台中教育大學附設實驗國民小學 | English | |
| Natural Way Elementary School | 道禾實驗小學 | Chinese | |
| Yu Jen Catholic Elementary School | 育仁小學 | Chinese | |
| Shen Chai Elementary School | 慎齋小學 | Chinese | |
| Wagor Educational System (Elementary School) | 葳格小學 | Chinese | |
| The Elementary School of Tunghai University | 東海大學附設小學 | Chinese | |
| Feng Le School | 豐樂實驗學校 | Chinese | |

== International schools ==
Taichung has three international schools. Two of them use English as the medium of instruction and offer an American-style curriculum, while the third is a school for Japanese children. One must possess a foreign passport to attend any of these schools.

- Morrison Academy (馬禮遜美國學校)
- American School in Taichung (台中美國學校)
- Taichung Japanese School (台中日僑學校)
- National Experimental High School at Central Taiwan Science Park

== Mandarin and Taiwanese Training Centers ==
Taichung City/County offers three accredited Mandarin language programs.

- Tunghai University Chinese Language Center
- Providence University Chinese Language Education Center
- Feng Chia University Language Center

== Other schools ==
Taichung City has dozens of kindergartens and cram schools. While many are registered with the government and can be found on the Chinese version of the Taichung Education Bureau website (see below), not all are.

Shane English School – Daya District – A private English language institution for Taiwanese citizens, taught by English speaking natives.

== See also ==
- Education in Taiwan
