= SDHS =

SDHS may refer to:

- New Taipei Municipal ShiDing High School, a high school in New Taipei, Taiwan
- San Diego High School, a high school in San Diego, California, United States
- San Diego High School (Texas), a high school in San Diego, Texas, United States
- South Dade High School, a high school in Homestead, Florida, United States
- South Decatur Junior-Senior High School, a high school in Greensburg, Indiana, United States
- Stuarts Draft High School, a high school in Stuarts Draft, Virginia, United States
- Summit Denali High School, a high school run by charter school organization Summit Public Schools
