= Provincial Highway 63 (Taiwan) =

Road in Taiwan

Provincial Highway 63
- 台63線
- Zhongtou Highway (中投公路)

Route information
- Maintained by Directorate General of Highways
- Length: 19.023 km (11.820 mi)
- Existed: 1 January 1998–present

Major junctions
- North end: Prov 3 in South District, Taichung
- Nat 3 in Wufeng
- East end: Prov 14b in Caotun, Nantou

Location
- Country: Taiwan

Highway system
- Highway system in Taiwan
← Prov 62	→ Prov 64

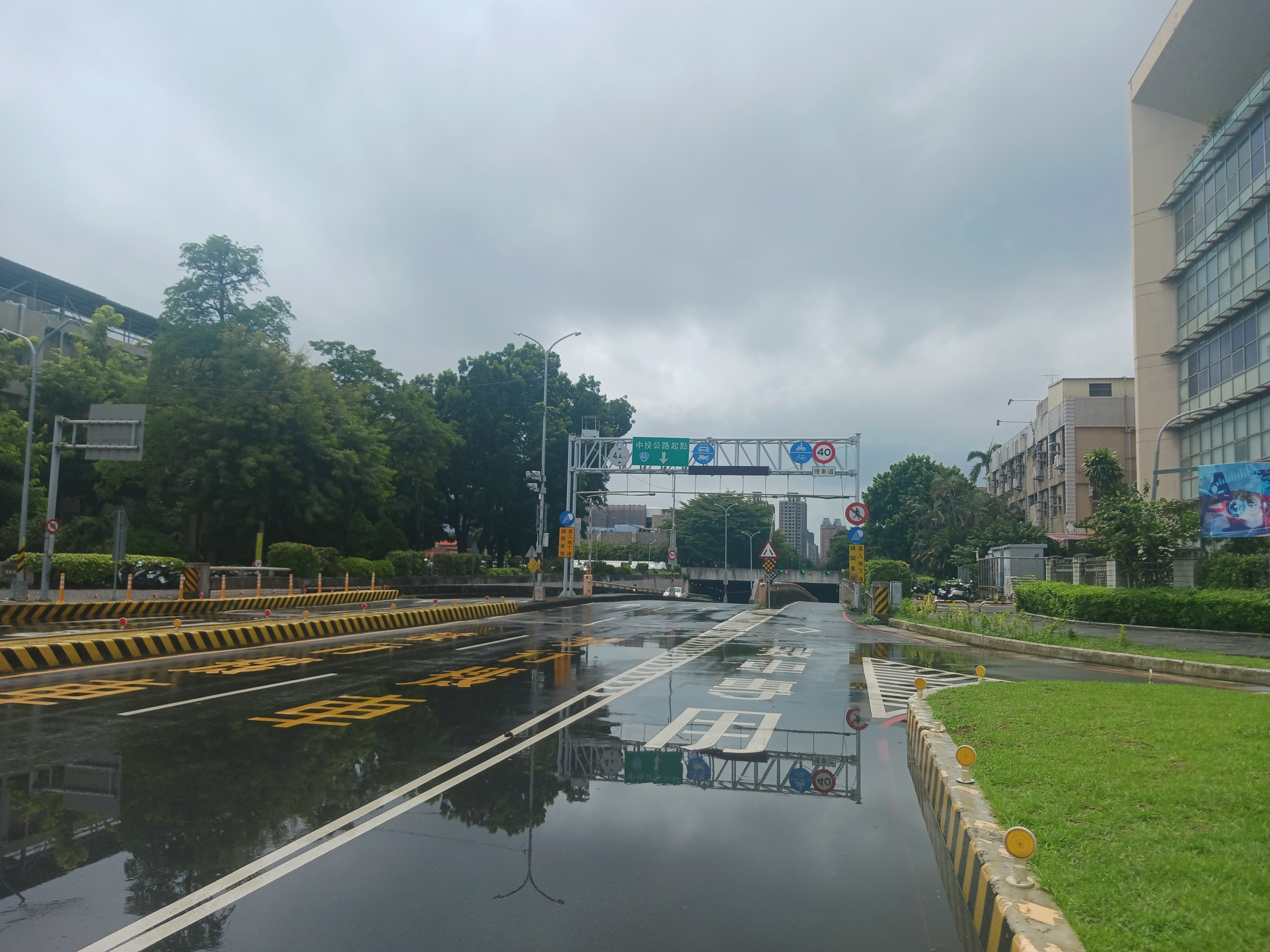
Taichung End, the north end and 0KM of Provincial Highway 63

Provincial Highway 63 (Chinese: 台63線) is a limited-access highway which begins in Taichung at the intersection of Guoguang Road (Provincial Highway No. 3) and Zhongming South Road and ends in Caotun, Nantou on Bixing Road (Provincial Road 14B). It is commonly known as Zhongtou (Taichung-Nantou) Highway.

== Length ==
The total length of the highway is 19.023 km. However, the viaduct actually begins at 1.8 km (on Wuquan South Road).

== Exit list ==
City	Location	km	Mile	Exit	Name	Destinations	Notes
Taichung City	South District	0.000	0.000	—		Prov 3 – Dali, Central Taichung	
Taichung City	Begin Viaduct						
Taichung City	Dali	2.6	1.6	2	Dali 1	Defang Rd., Wenxin South Rd. - Dali, Nantun	
Taichung City	Dali	3.9	2.4	3	Dali 2	Dali Rd., Wuguang Rd. - Wufeng, Wuri	
Taichung City	Wufeng	6.2	3.9	6	Wufu	Wufu Rd., Wufu South Rd. - Dali, Wufeng	
Taichung City	Wufeng	7.74	4.81	7	Zhongtou	Nat 3	
Taichung City	Wufeng	8.2	5.1	8	Taiming	Cty 127 – Wuri, Dali	
Taichung City	Wufeng	10.1	6.3	10	Dingtai	Dingtai Rd.	
Taichung City	Wufeng	12.4	7.7	12	Wanfeng	Fengzheng Rd.	
Nantou County	Caotun	14.8	9.2	14	Caotun 1	Prov 63a – Central Caotun, Puli	
Nantou County	Caotun	16.7	10.4	16	Caotun 2	Prov 14 – Caotun, Fenyuan	
Nantou County	Caotun	End Viaduct					
Nantou County	Caotun	19.023	11.820	18		Prov 14b	
1.000 mi = 1.609 km; 1.000 km = 0.621 mi

== Major Cities Along the Route ==
- Taichung
- Caotun, Nantou

== Intersections with other Freeways and Expressways ==
- None. However, it crosses National Highway No. 3 near Zhongtou IC in Wufeng, Taichung. To access National Highway No. 3, one must navigate surface streets for two or three minutes to get onto a northbound or southbound ramp for the highway.

== Spurs ==
There is a spur (No. 63A) connecting to Bo-ai Road (Provincial Highway No. 14) in downtown Caotun, Nantou. The length of the spur is 2.193 km.

== See also ==
- Highway system in Taiwan

== Notes ==
Completed on January 1, 1998.

This highway is no longer classified as an expressway on July 1, 2006. Despite this lack of designation, it still functions as one.
