= HUST =

Hust or HUST may refer to:

- Huazhong University of Science and Technology in Wuhan, Hubei, China
- Hanoi University of Science and Technology in Hanoi, Vietnam
- Harbin University of Science and Technology in Harbin, Heilongjiang, China
- Harrisburg University of Science and Technology in Harrisburg, Pennsylvania, USA
- Hsiuping University of Science and Technology in Taichung, Taiwan
- Khust in western Ukraine
