= RSSH =

RSSH or rssh may refer to:

- Kaohsiung Municipal Ruei-Siang Senior High School, in Cianjhen District, Kaohsiung, Taiwan
- rssh, a restricted shell used with OpenSSH
- RSSH is the general formula for a persulfide
