= Chen Xi =

Chen Xi is the atonal pinyin romanization of various Chinese names.

It may refer to:

- Chen Xi (陳豨, died 194 BC), a Chinese rebel under the early Han
- Chen Xi (陈希, born 1953), a Chinese politician who served on the Politburo of the Chinese Communist Party
- Chen Xi (born c. 1954), a Chinese dissident arrest during a 2011 crackdown
- Chen Xi (晨曦), a Chinese lyricist for the 1979 The Wild Goose on the Wing
- Chen Xi (陈曦; born c. 1983), a Chinese musician, a member of Snapline
- Chen Xi (陈曦; born c. 1996), contestant on I Supermodel, Season 1
- Chen Xi (陈锡), a character in the 2008 Singaporean series The Little Nyonya
- Chen Xi, a character in the 2009 Chinese series I'm a Boss
- Chen Xi (陈熙), a character in the 2012 Singaporean series Jump!
- Chen Xi (陈熙), a Singaporean actor

== See also ==
- Duke Xi of Chen (陳釐公, Chén Xī Gōng)
- Chen Xi Building at the Affiliated Senior High School of National Kaohsiung Normal University in Kaohsiung, Taiwan
