= Peter Tsai =

Taiwanese American material scientist and inventor

Peter Tsai (Chinese: 蔡秉燚; born February 6, 1952) is a Taiwanese-American inventor and material scientist who is best known for inventing and patenting improved meltblown filtration manufacturing techniques, used in respirators, like N95 respirators, a 1995 NIOSH standard made to address the shortcomings of USBM standards. (Note: Note: In spite of the claims made by sources cited in this biography on Tsai's N95 involvement, please refer to the N95 respirator article for more information. The N95 is a 42 CFR Part 84 standard, effective July 10, 1995. Citations to support Tsai's work follow:) He is an expert in the field of nonwoven fabric. Tsai was a professor emeritus at the University of Tennessee, but ended his retirement during the COVID-19 pandemic to research mask and respirator sterilization.

== Early life and education ==
Tsai grew up on his family's farm in the Qingshui District of Taichung, Taiwan and graduated from Taichung Municipal Cingshuei Senior High School. He studied chemical fibre engineering at the Provincial Taipei Institute of Technology, now known as National Taipei University of Technology.

== Career ==
After graduating college he went to work at the Taiwan Textile Research Institute before finding work in a dyeing and finishing plant. He then went abroad to the United States for postgraduate work at Kansas State University in 1981, completing over 500 credits in a variety of subjects including mathematics, physics, and chemistry.

After receiving his doctorate in materials science, Tsai went to teach and work at the University of Tennessee. In total, he holds 12 U.S. patents and over 20 commercial license agreements. Tsai retired from the University of Tennessee in 2019. He was a professor in the Department of Material Science and Engineering.

In 2020, Tsai came out of retirement in response to the COVID-19 pandemic, he has been working with the scientific collective N95DECON on ways to decontaminate N95 masks.

== Meltblown Charge Techniques ==
In 1992 while at the University of Tennessee, Tsai led a team attempting to improve electrostatic filtration manufacturing. The material consists of both positive and negative charges, which are better able to attract particles — such as dust, bacteria and viruses — and trap them by polarization before they can pass through the mask. It was patented in the U.S. in 1995.

Tsai continued to do work into mask technology and in 2018 he developed a new technique which doubled the filtration capacity of medical masks.

== See also ==
- List of Taiwanese inventions and discoveries
- Taiwanese Americans
- List of Taiwanese Americans
