= Tsz-Shiou Senior High School =

Private school in New Taipei, Taiwan

Coordinates: 24.9325°N 121.4086°E

Tsz-Shiou Senior High School is a high school in New Taipei City, Taiwan. It was founded in 1971 by Chen Lu An, eldest son of former vice-president, Chen Cheng a.k.a. Chen Tsyr-shiou, of the Republic of China (Taiwan).

== See also ==
- Secondary education in Taiwan
- List of schools in Taiwan
