= Nan Kai University of Technology =

Private university in Nantou County, Taiwan

Coordinates: 23.979753°N 120.696851°E

- 南開科技大學
- Type: Private
- Established: 1971 (as Nan Kai Junior College); August 2008 (as NKUT)
- Location: Caotun, Nantou County, Taiwan
- Website: Official website

Nan Kai University of Technology
- Traditional Chinese: 南開科技大學
Transcriptions
Standard Mandarin
- Hanyu Pinyin: Nánkāi Kējì Dàxué
Southern Min
- Hokkien POJ: Lâm-khai Kho-ki Tāi-ha̍k

Nan Kai University of Technology (NKUT; Chinese: 南開科技大學; Pe̍h-ōe-jī: Lâm-khai Kho-ki Tāi-ha̍k) is a private university in Caotun Township, Nantou County, Taiwan.

NKUT offers a wide range of undergraduate and graduate programs across various disciplines such as engineering, design, management, and humanities. The university has four colleges: the College of Engineering, the College of Design, the College of Management, and the College of Humanities.

== History ==
NKUT was founded as Nan Kai Junior College in 1971. In August 1993, the college was renamed to Nan Kai Junior College of Technology and Commerce. In August 2001, the college was accredited as Nan Kai Institute of Technology. In August 2008, the school was renamed to Nan Kai University of Technology.

== Faculties ==
- College of Electrical and Computer Engineering
- College of Engineering
- College of Extension Education
- College of Human Ecology
- College of Management

== See also ==
- List of universities in Taiwan
