= Luzhu District, Taoyuan =

Luzhu 蘆竹區 Lujhu, Luchu
- District
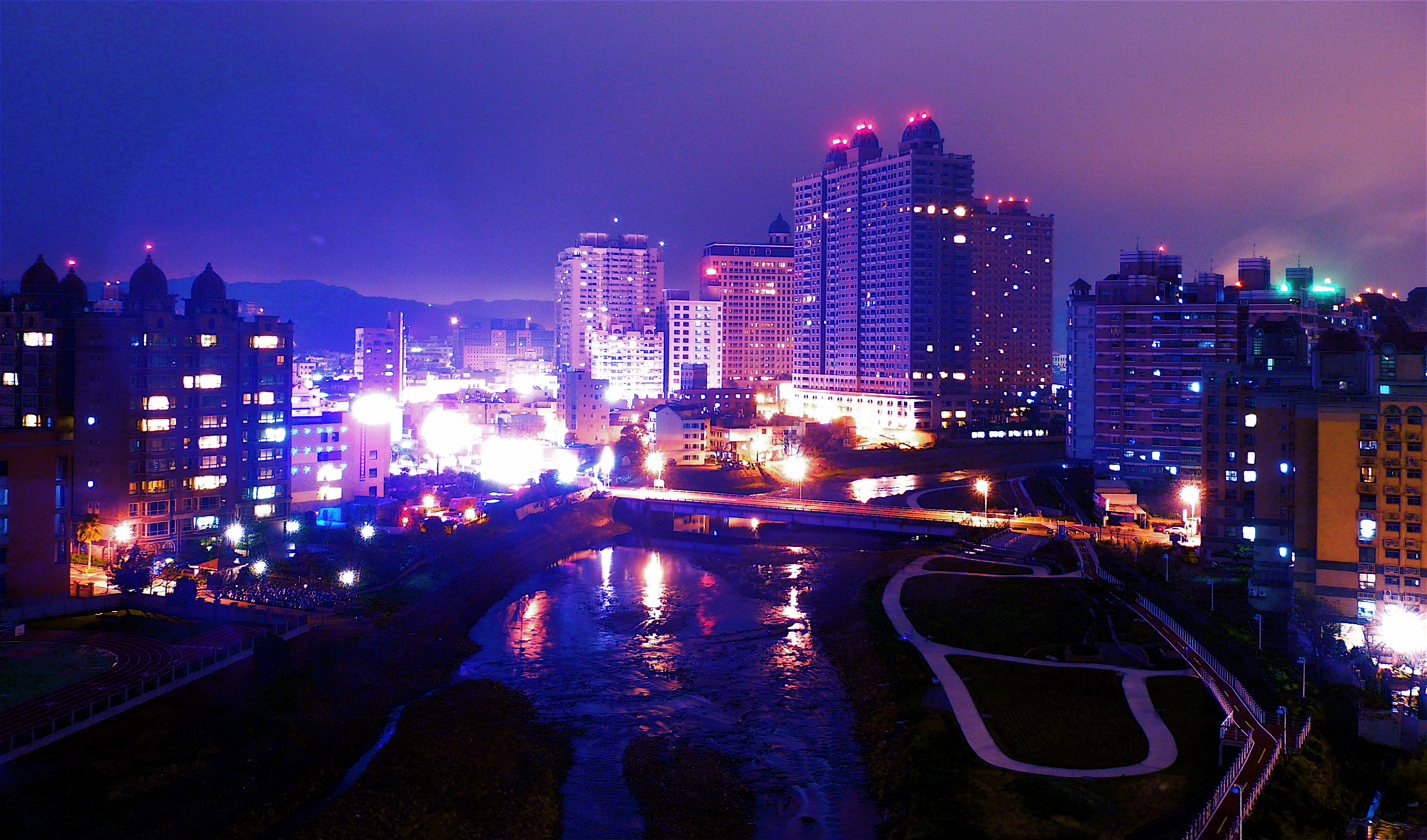

- Coordinates: 25°02′N 121°17′E
- Country: Taiwan
- Municipality: Taoyuan City

Government
  - Mayor: Chu Chunlai

Area
  - Total: 75.5025 km^{2} (29.1517 sq mi)

Population (February 2023)
  - Total: 167,654
  - Density: 2,220.51/km^{2} (5,751.09/sq mi)
- Website: www.luzhu.tycg.gov.tw (in Chinese)

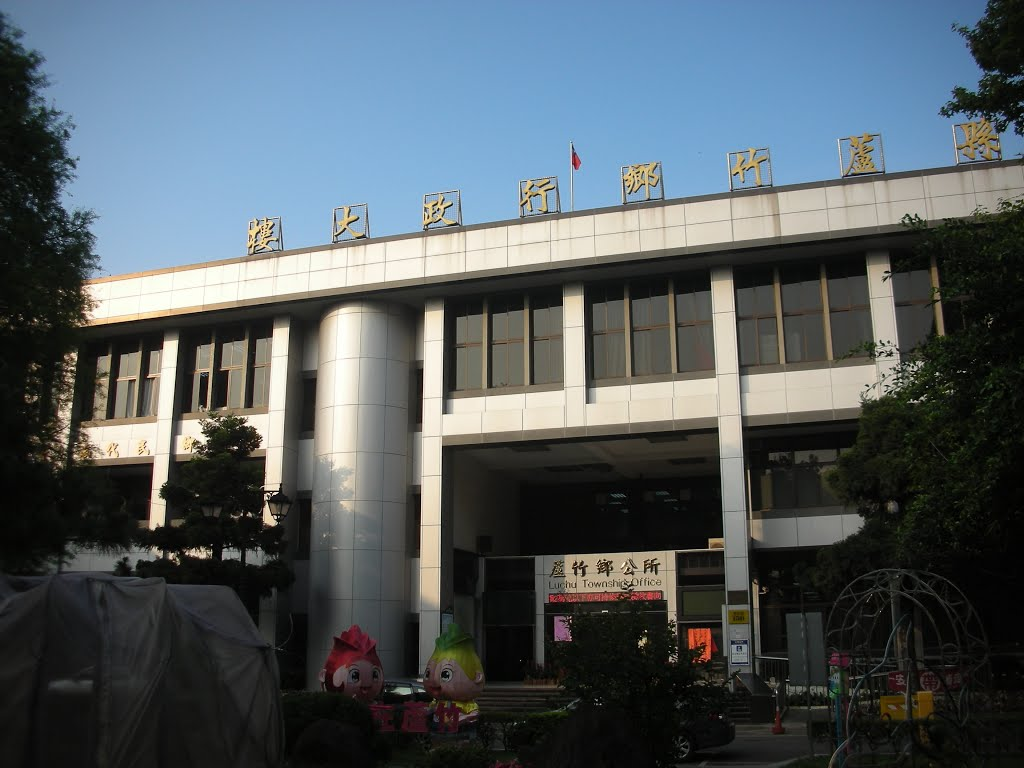
Luzhu District office (then Luzhu Township office)

Luzhu District (Chinese: 蘆竹區; pinyin: Lúzhú Qū) is a district in Taoyuan City, Taiwan, home to 165,914 people.

The downtown district, known as Nankan, is now a high density, high-rise suburb for many who work in Taipei and Taoyuan City. The first opened shopping center in Taiwan, Taimall, located in Nankan, is a weekend destination for many Taoyuan regional residents. Taimall is located around 2 km (1.2 mi) north-northwest of the Nankan interchange, 25.054083°N 121.288389°E, on National Freeway 1.

== History ==
Luzhu was upgraded to a county-administered city from the former rural township of Taoyuan County on 3 June 2014. On 25 December 2014, it was upgraded again to a district named Luzhu District of Taoyuan City.

== Geography ==
- Area: 75.50 km^{2} (29.15 sq mi)
- Population: 167,654 (February 2023)

== Administrative divisions ==
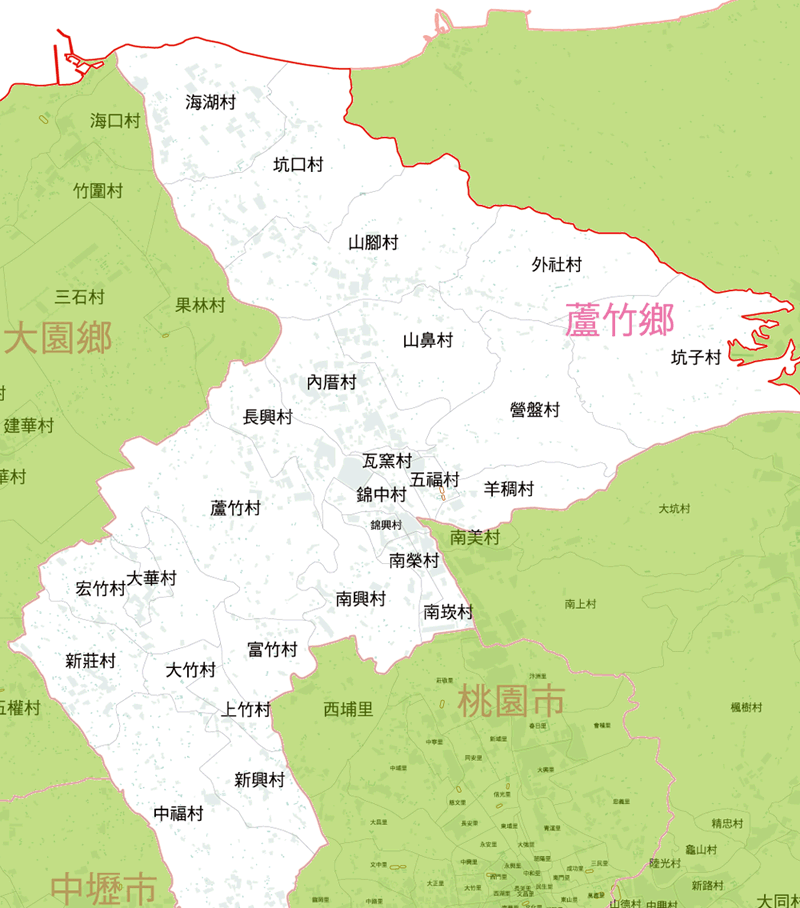
Administrative divisions of Luzhu District (then Luzhu Township)

The district is administered as 37 villages: Dazhu, Fuchang, Fulu, Fuxing, Fuzhu, Haihu, Hongzhu, Jinxing, Jinzhong, Jixiang, Kengkou, Kengzi, Luxing, Luzhu, Nankan, Nanrong, Nanxing, Neicuo, Shanbi, Shangxing, Shangzhu, Shanjiao, Shunxing, Waishe, Wayao, Wufu, Xiangchou, Xingrong, Xinxing, Xinzhuang, Yingfu, Yingpan, Zhangshou, Zhangxing, Zhongfu, Zhongshan and Zhongxing.

== Economy ==
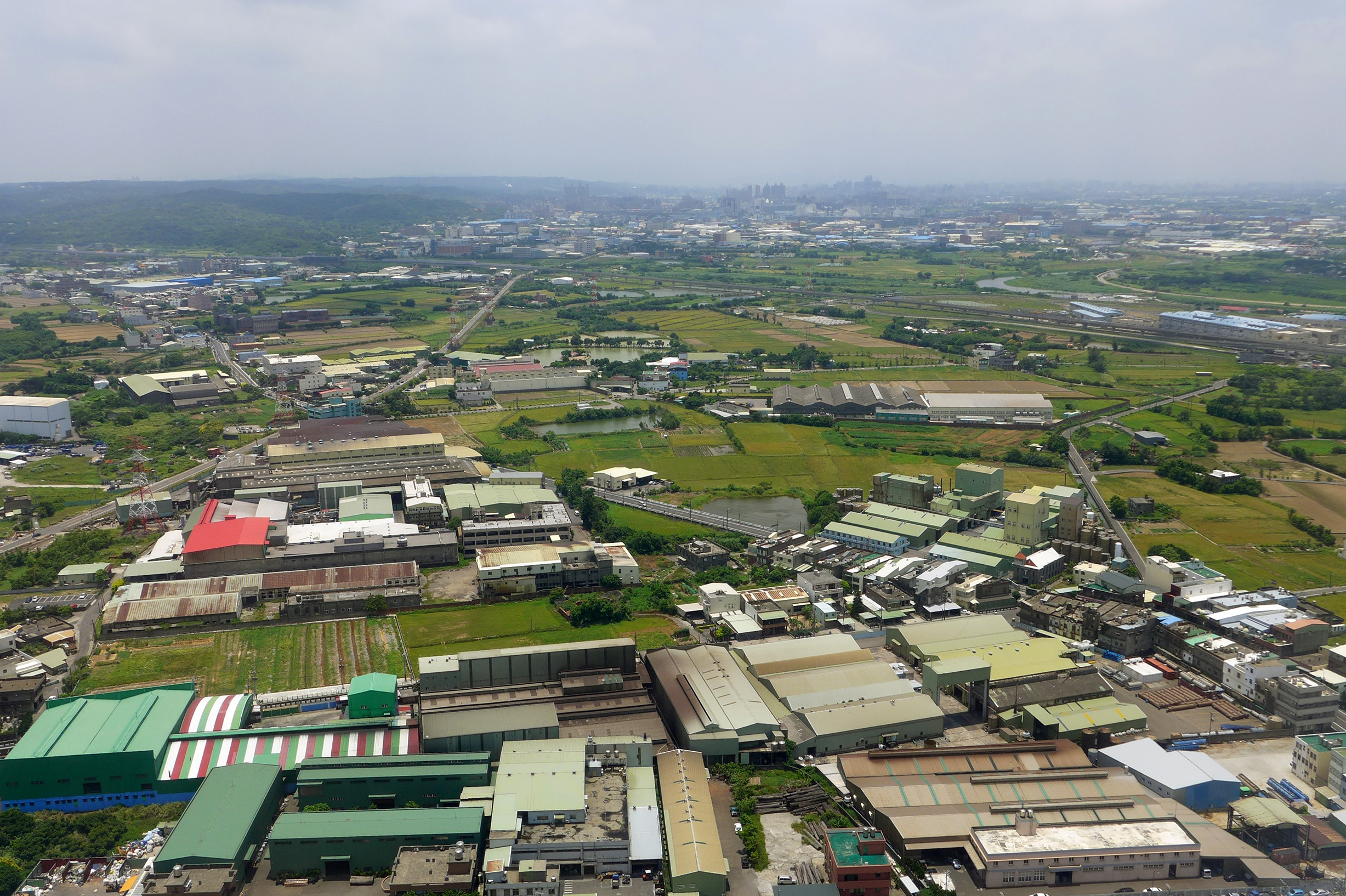
Industrial Area in Luzhu District

EVA Air maintains its headquarters in Luzhu. The headquarters of Evergreen Marine Corporation is also in Luzhu.

== Education ==
=== Universities and colleges ===
- Kainan University

=== High schools ===
- Taoyuan Municipal Nankan Senior High School

=== International schools ===
- Taoyuan American School

== Transportation ==
=== Road ===
Luzhu is located at kilometer 49 of the Highway no. 1 (English highway signs: 'Nankan interchange' or 'Taoyuan interchange').

=== Taoyuan Airport MRT ===
- Kengkou Station
- Shanbi Station

== See also ==
- Taoyuan City
