= Yu-hsiu Museum of Art =

Museum in Caotun, Nantou County, Taiwan

- 毓繡美術館
- Established: January 2016
- Location: Caotun, Nantou County, Taiwan
- Coordinates: 23°59′34.1″N 120°45′59.7″E
- Type: art museum
- Director: Lee Chu-hsin
- Architect: Liao Wei-li
- Website: Official website

The Yu-hsiu Museum of Art (traditional Chinese: 毓繡美術館; simplified Chinese: 毓绣美术馆; pinyin: Yùxiù Měishùguǎn) is an art museum in Caotun Township, Nantou County, Taiwan.

== History ==
The museum was completed in October 2015, and opened in January 2016. The museum was then won the top prize of the 2016 Taiwan Architecture Award by Taiwan Architect Magazine.

== Architecture ==
The museum building was designed by architect Liao Wei-li (廖偉立).

== See also ==
- List of museums in Taiwan
