= Taoyuan American School =

- 桃園美國學校
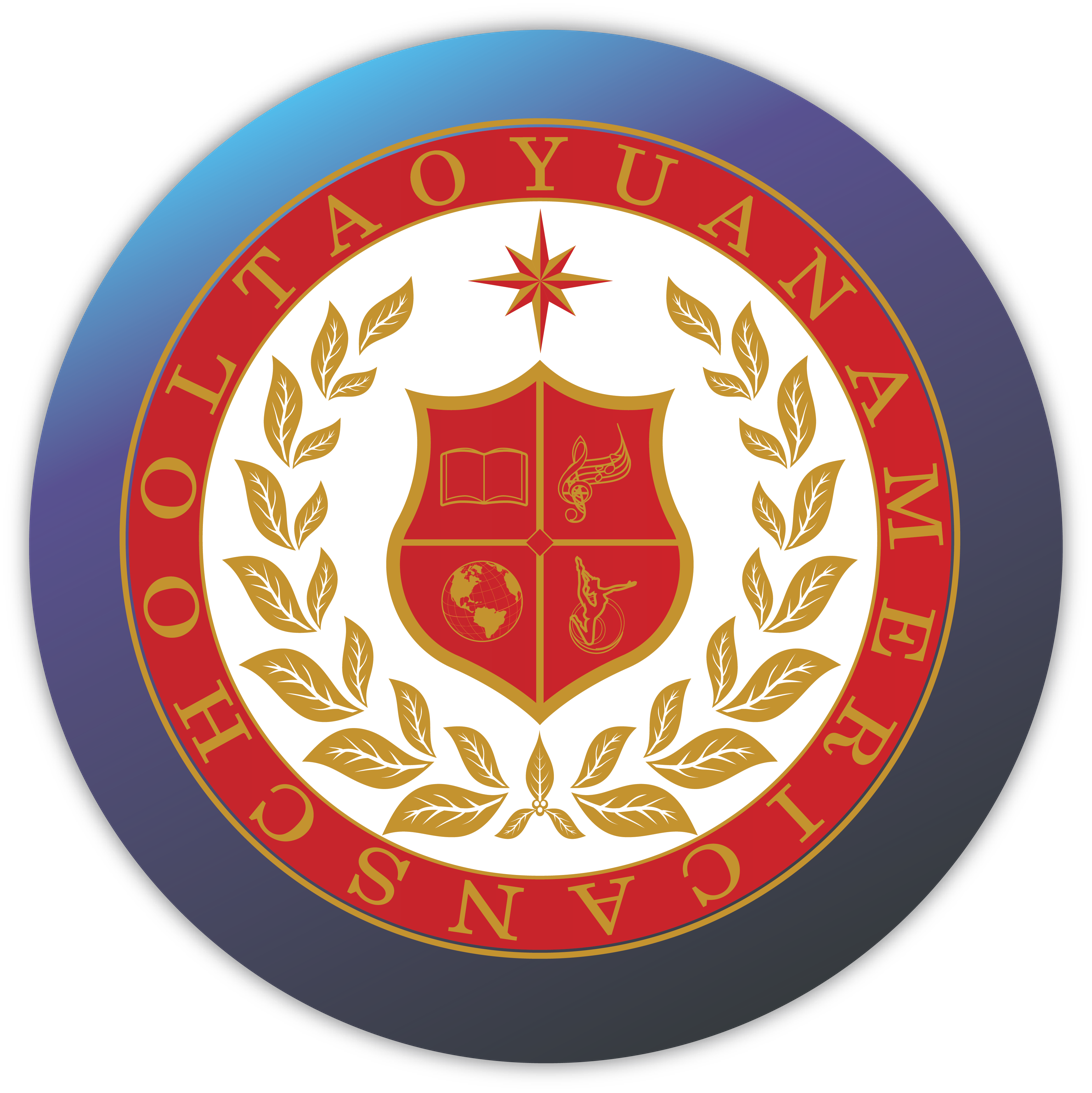

Location
- Luzhu, Taoyuan City, Taiwan
- Coordinates: 25°00′46.1″N 121°16′05.7″E

Information
- Type: International school
- Established: 2012
- Principal: TBD
- Website: https://www.tyas.tyc.edu.tw/

Taoyuan American School (TYAS; Chinese: 桃園美國學校; pinyin: Táoyuán Měiguó Xuéxiào) is an American international school in Luzhu District, Taoyuan City, Taiwan. (MOE). The school admits students with non-Republic of China passport and serves grades 1–12.

TYAS offers an American-based curriculum. The school has been authorized by the American Institute in Taiwan (AIT) and licensed by the Ministry of Education.

== Campus ==
The 1-hectare (2.5-acre) campus, adjacent to Kainan University, includes 14 classrooms, art facilities, a computer lab, three science labs, a cafeteria, a music facility, an auditorium that doubles as a lecture theater, a snack bar, and an information technology and library center.
