= New Taipei Municipal Banqiao Senior High School =

Coordinates: 25°00′44.1″N 121°27′31.7″E

New Taipei Municipal Banqiao Senior High School 新北市立板橋高級中學
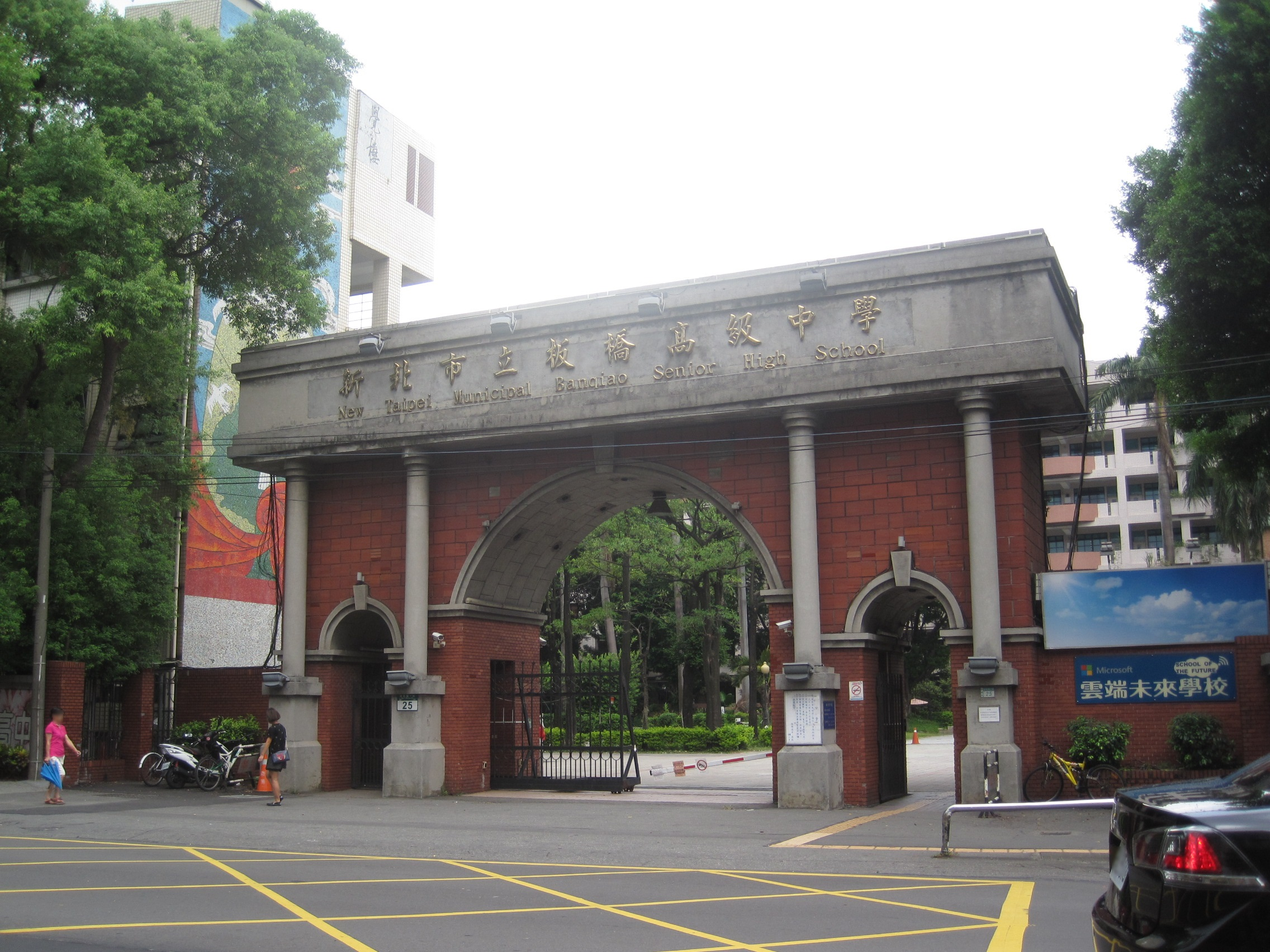

Location
- No.25, Sec. 1, Wenhua Rd., Banqiao District, New Taipei, Taiwan 22050

Information
- Other name: New Taipei Municipal Banqiao Senior High School
- Motto: Loyalty, Diligent, Macro, Perseverance
- Established: 1946 A.D.Taiwan Province Taipei County Banqiao Senior High School
- Principal: Kao Bai Ling
- Staff: 137 teacher
- Grades: Grade 10, 11, 12
- Enrollment: 2400 students
- Website: http://fix.pcsh.ntpc.edu.tw/1/school.htm

The New Taipei Municipal Banqiao Senior High School (Chinese: 新北市立板橋高級中學; pinyin: Xīnběi Shìlì Bǎnqiáo Gāojí Zhōngxué) is a high school in Banqiao District, New Taipei, Taiwan. It is the top high school in New Taipei City.

== Introduction ==
The school was founded in September, 1946, with the name Taipei County Banqiao Junior High School. It was also called “Garden of Lindens”, for there were once two ancient linden trees.

In 1950 Banqiao Junior High School turned into senior high school. The current school, including junior and senior high, was formally established in 1952. The same year it was restructured and titled Taiwan Provincial Banqiao Senior High School. In 2000 the school was renamed National Banqiao Senior High School.

In 2002, due to the rising status of New Taipei City from Taipei County, the school was renamed New Taipei City Panciao High School. There are 61 classes, composed of male and female students. Among them, there are three classes for mathematical gifted students, and one class for both mentally and physically disabled students.

== History ==
- Taipei County, Taiwan Province Banqiao High School (1946-1952)
- Taiwan Provincial Banqiao Junior High School (1952-1970)
- Taiwan Provincial Banqiao senior High School (1970-2000)
- National Banqiao Senior High School (2000-2012)
- Banqiao Senior High School (2013 -)

== School anthem ==
The Banqiao senior high school song is by Luo-Shoushu lyrics, Lin-Dongzhe composition as follows:(sound)

=== Chinese lyrics ===
遠山聳翠，淡水溶溶，吾校秀毓而靈鍾；

規模宏廓，校風肅雍，絃歌載誦樂融融。

我們要實踐倫理，化俗移風，我們要篤行民主，天下為公，我們要精研科學，征服太空！

同學們，熱愛我們的國家，必孝必忠，負起我們的責任，亦毅亦弘，爭取我們的榮譽，為聖為雄。

看，古今中外，有志者畢竟成功。

=== English （Translate） ===
Distant mountains rise verdantly, the Tamsui River(淡水河) flows gently — our school nurtures excellence and gathers spiritual grace.

With grand scale and solemn, harmonious spirit, our campus is filled with the joy of music and learning.

We shall uphold ethics and reform customs; we shall practice democracy, with the world as one community; we shall delve deeply into science and conquer outer space!

Fellow students, love our nation with filial piety and loyalty. Take up our responsibilities with resolve and breadth of vision. Strive for our honor — noble in spirit and strong in action.

Look — throughout history and around the world, those with determination shall surely succeed.

== Notable alumni ==
=== Economy ===
- Terry Gou: Group Chairman of Hon Hai.
- Yan-Ming Cai: Group Chairman of Wang-Zhong.
- Lin, Hong-Ming: Taipei 101 Company General Manager and Chairman.

=== Education ===
- Liao Jinshun: Banqiao Senior High School Alumni Association President, former State representative
- Lin Shiming: MESAN University of Science and Technology
- Ma Chengmin: Mingchi University of Technology Dean
- Huang Wanju: Taipei Municipal University of Education Dean
- Chen Weihong: former President of Taipei City lishangaozhong, currently founding principal
- Dai zhicheng: former guangrengaozhong President
- Unique treasurehouse: Academia Sinica's Institute of modern history adjunct researcher, National Taiwan Normal University Professor
- Liao Nian Fu: the Taipei century Symphony Orchestra Music Director, National Taiwan University of Arts, Professor of music
- Qian Nan chapters: contemporary composers, National Taipei University of the arts, Professor of music
- Lin Rongcong: Taipei municipal Songshan advertising design Panel Chair
- Xu Zhenghang: Chung Yuan Christian University Professor of mechanical engineering

== Transportation ==
The school is accessible within walking distance north of Fuzhong Station of Taipei Metro.

== See also ==
- Education in Taiwan
- List of schools in Taiwan
- High School
