= National Caotun Commercial & Industrial Vocational Senior High School =

- 國立草屯高級商工職業學校
- CTCIHS Emblem

Location
- No.188, Sec. 3, Dunhuang Rd. Caotun, Nantou; Taiwan
- Coordinates: 23.996144°N 120.665625°E

Information
- Type: Vocational Public High School
- Opened: 1955
- Principal: Tsai, Hue-Deng
- Faculty: 117 (as of 2010)
- Grades: 10–12
- Campus type: Suburban
- Website: http://www.ttvs.ntct.edu.tw/

National Caotun Commercial & Industrial Vocational Senior High School (simplified Chinese: 国立草屯高级商工职业学校; traditional Chinese: 國立草屯高級商工職業學校; CTCIHS), also known as National Tsaotun Commercial & Industrial Vocational Senior High School (sometimes abbreviated TTVS), is located in the town of Caotun, Nantou County, Taiwan, Republic of China.

== History ==
- 1955 – The school as well as its night school was founded as a division of Taichung Home Economics and Commercial High School.
- 1959 – Admitted by Ministry of Education, the school was reformed into Taiwan Provincial Caotun Commercial Vocational School & Night School.
- 1970 – Renamed Taiwan Provincial Caotun Commercial Vocation High School.
- 1974 – Renamed Taiwan Provincial Caotun Commercial and Industrial High School & Night School while Industrial Dept. was established.
- 1980 – The Dept. of Pipe Fitting, which was the only one in the schools of Taiwan, was established.
- 1988 – The Dept. of Data Processing was established.
- 1999 – The school was approved to move to new campus due to the 921 earthquake.
- 2000 – Renamed National Caotun Commercial and Industrial High School & Night School (CTCIHS).
- 2001 – New campus construction ceremony was held on Dec. 31.
- March 2004 – New campus construction was completed and the president came in person to give away a board written: “Rebuild the Excellence”.
- September 2004 – CTCIHS moved to the new campus and turn over a new leave.
- 2007 – Rearrange the departments and the Dept. of Applied Foreign Language is established.

== Department ==
=== Day School ===
- Dept. of Business Affairs
- Dept. of Accounting Affairs
- Dept. of Data Processing
- Dept. of Applied Foreign Language
- Dept. of Machinery
- Dept. of Pipe Fitting
- Dept. of General Class (Major in Sport)
- Comprehensive Occupational Dept.

=== Continuing Education School ===
- Dept. of Business Affairs
- Dept. of Data Processing
- Dept. of Machinery

=== Practical Skill Classes ===
- Dept. of Industrial Engineering
- Dept. of Commercial Information

== See also ==
- National Taichung University of Science and Technology
- Vocational Education in Taiwan
