= Taoyuan Municipal Nankan Senior High School =

School in Taoyuan, Taiwan

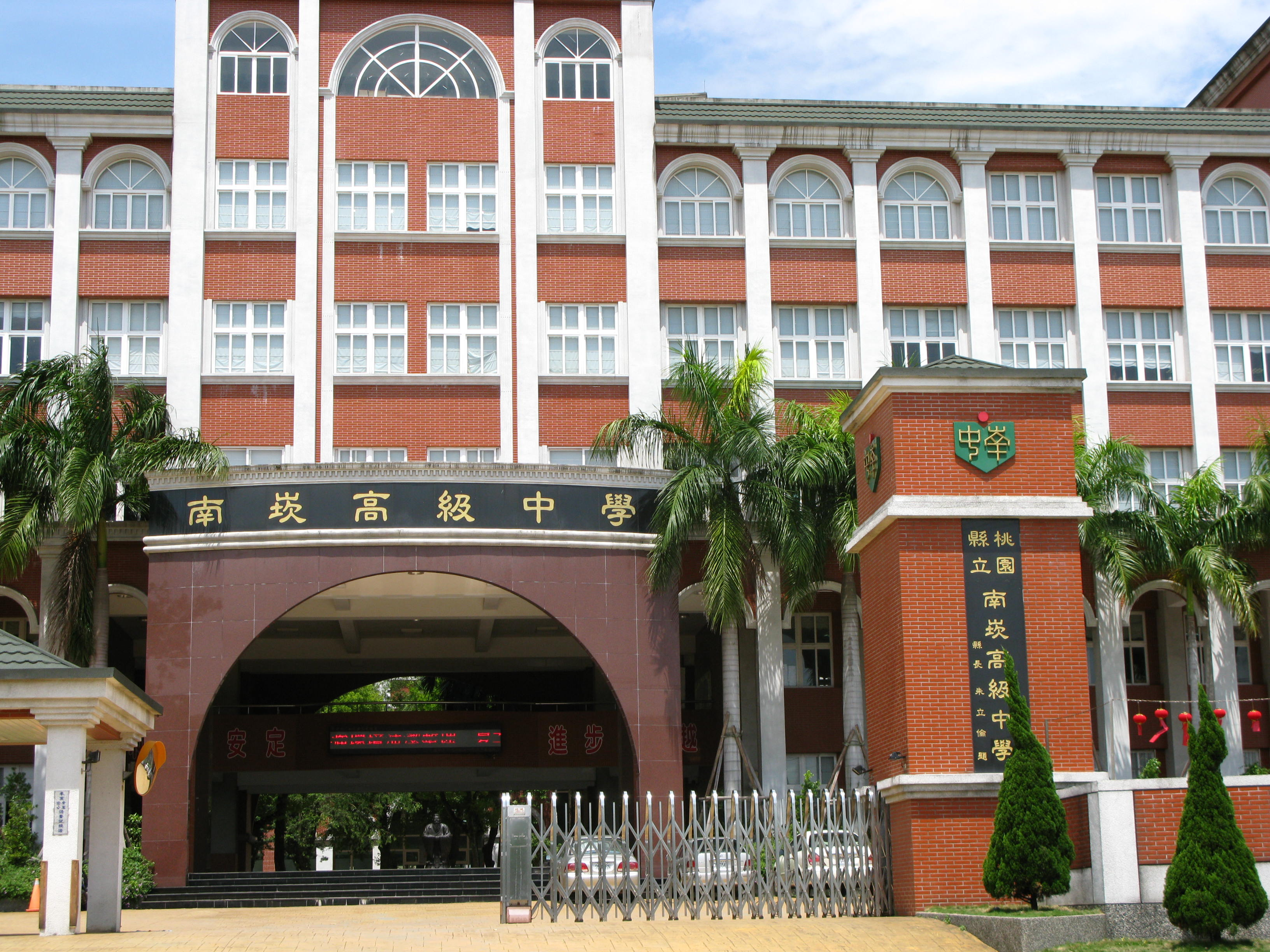
Taoyuan Municipal Nankan Senior High School

Taoyuan Municipal Nankan Senior High School (NKSH; Chinese: 桃園市立南崁高級中等學校) is a high school in Luzhu District, Taoyuan City, Taiwan.

== History ==
The school was established in 1924, under the name of Nankan Enterprise Auxiliary School during Japan's annexation. It is located in Wufu village, next to Wufu Temple, the 3rd grade historic site in Luchu Township. It originally was a two-year school, enrolled students graduating from Nankan, Kengzih and Luchu Elementary Schools. Eleven years later, it was reorganized into Hsinchu County Nankan Agricultural Specialized School in 1935.

In 1945, Taiwan was handed over from Japan to the Republic of China. Accordingly, the school had its name changed to be Hsinchu County Taoyuan Area Luchu Middle Agricultural Auxiliary School. In 1948, the school was renamed as Luchu Township Nankan Middle Vocational Auxiliary School. In 1951, the school was reorganized into Taoyuan County Nankan Middle Vocational School. The school was named Nankan Junior Middle School soon after junior high education started in 1959. The compulsory education program for primary and junior high school students was implemented in 1968, the school was thereby renamed Nankan Junior High School.

In 2000, the school founded a senior high department, enrolled six classes of grade 10 and expanded the campus to Nankan Elementary School. The school was reformed into a senior high school and its name was further renamed Taoyuan County Nankan Middle School. The following year, in 2001, the school was given orders to rename as Taoyuan County Nankan High School.

After the upgrade of Taoyuan County to city-status, the school was renamed to Taoyuan Municipal Nankan Senior High School.

Today, there are 58 junior high classes and 33 senior high classes in this school and the number of the alumni and alumnae is more than twenty thousand. This is one of the oldest middle schools in Taoyuan City.
