= Stanford American Language Institution =

- Company type: Private Institution
- Industry: Education
- Founded: Republic of China
- Headquarters: Hsinchu City, Taiwan
- Area served: Hsinchu City, Hsinchu County, and Miaoli County
- Subsidiaries: Stanford American Language School; Stanford American Language Press
- Website: www.stanfordschool.com.tw

Stanford American Language Institution (Chinese: 史丹佛文教機構; pinyin: Shidānfo Wénjiào Jīgòu) is an early childhood and primary (K to 12) educational institution based in Taiwan. Mainly located at Hsinchu City, Hsinchu County, and Miaoli County, subsidiaries include: Stanford American Language School (史丹佛美語學校) (include: kindergartens, nursery schools, and buxibans) and Stanford American Language Press. Stanford American Language Institution is the single largest private provider of English education in the county of Hsinchu and Miaoli.

== Jhunan School ==
In order to inform parents to choose a legal institution out of the flooded illegal institutions in Miaoli, on February 1, in early 2007, Miaoli County Government Department of Labor and Social Resources released a list of approved institutions on its official website. Stanford American Language School is upon the list. The list is also available on the Taiwan Government's Bureau of Social Affairs website, the text of the declaration are shown as follows:

For children to grow in a safe and happy environment the institutions must pass the following inspections, which include: safety inspections, fire safety inspections, health checks before they can be listed here on file. By Bureau of Social Affairs here are the approved institutions for parents to choose for their children in order to protect the rights and interests of children and parents.

== Ching-kuo School ==
The first kindergarten in Taiwan that has solar panel, and the first private school that works with Taiwan's Bureau of Energy, Ministry of Economic Affairs.

== Award ==
Hsinchu Science Park School
• 2005 － Hsinchu City Government Merit Award for Excellent Fire Safety Performance
• 2005 － Merit Award for Play Facilities and Equipment Safety Award, by the Department of Health, the Executive Yuan of R.O.C.
• 1997 － Merit Award for Child Health Care, by Hsinchu City Health Bureau

Jhubei School
• 2004 － Awarded the highest honor for outstanding performance in the county-wide preschool health and hygiene evaluation in Hsinchu County.

Jhunan School
• 2008 － Best Early Childhood Educational Award, by Miaoli Government
• 2006 － Best Early Childhood Educational Award, by Miaoli Government
• 2004 － 2nd Place in Disease Free - Campus Health Promotion Award, by the Department of Health, the Executive Yuan of R.O.C.
• 2003 － Best Early Childhood Educational Award, by Miaoli Government

=== School Tradition ===
Every year, Stanford American Language School will host a grand Christmas Party.
