= New Taipei Municipal Sanzhi Junior High School =

Coordinates: 25°1′51.26″N 121°30′44.23″E

- 新北市立三芝國民中學

Location
- No.38, Sec. 1, Danjin Rd. Sanzhi Dist. New Taipei City; Taiwan

Information
- School type: Public school
- Established: 1946
- Head of school: Ceng Jing-yue
- Grades: 7 - 9
- Age range: 13 - 15
- Enrollment: 827
- Language: Chinese (Traditional)
- Website: http://www.szjh.ntpc.edu.tw

The New Taipei Municipal Sanzhi Junior High School (Chinese: 新北市立三芝國民中學) is a junior high school in Sanzhi, New Taipei City, Taiwan.

== History ==
The predecessor of New Taipei Municipal Sanzhi Junior High School was Taipei County Sanzhi Junior High School, founded in May 1946. Village Mayor Mr. Lu Gen-de taught lessons to students from Sanzhi and Shimen villages in borrowed rooms of Farmer's Association. In Spring 1951, new classrooms were completed and the school was officially moved to its current site.

In Autumn 1968, the government implemented the Nine-Year Compulsory Education, and the school was renamed as Taipei County Sanzhi Junior High School. In 2010, as the County became a municipality, the school was renamed as New Taipei Municipal Sanzhi Junior High School.

Sixty-eight years have passed since the school's founding in 1946. In Sanzhi and Shimen, the school has proved itself to be one of the distinctive schools with the richest history as well as the best faculty and facilities. Currently, the school has 29 regular classes, 1 special education class, and 1 resource class. The total number of students and faculty members is around nine hundreds. The former principals dedicated themselves to planning and managing school affairs. They kept improving the quality of the faculty; at the same time, they continued upgrading learning and teaching equipment—all in an effort to promote the school to be the most qualified learning environment. The current principal Ms. Ceng Jing-yue swore as the school's twentieth principal on August 1, 2012.
