= The Affiliated Senior High School of National Chung Hsing University =

Coordinates: 24°06′32″N 120°40′59″E

- 國立中興大學附屬高級中學
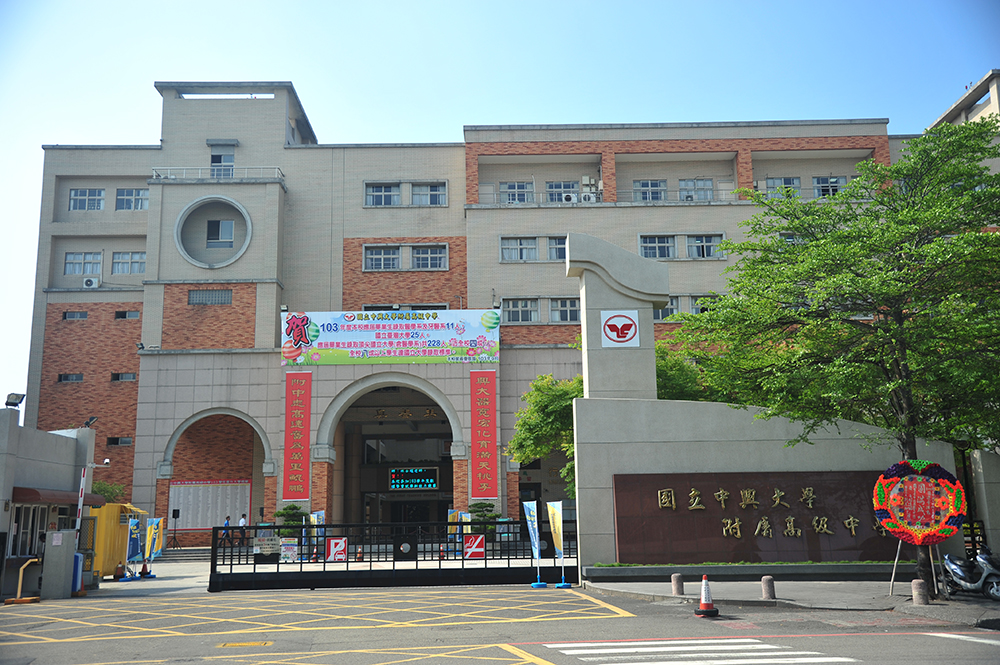
- Dali District, Taichung, Taiwan

Information
- Type: National senior high school
- Motto: 真善美
- Established: 2001
- Principal: Yung-Yen Chen (acting)
- Faculty: 100
- Enrollment: 1,800
- Website: www.dali.tc.edu.tw

The Affiliated Senior High School of National Chung Hsing University (Chinese: 國立中興大學附屬高級中學) is a senior high school in Dali District, Taichung, Taiwan.

== See also ==
- Education in Taiwan
