= Sanzhi District =

District in New Taipei, Taiwan

Sanzhi 三芝區 Sanchih, Sanjhih, Sanshi
- District
- Sanzhi District
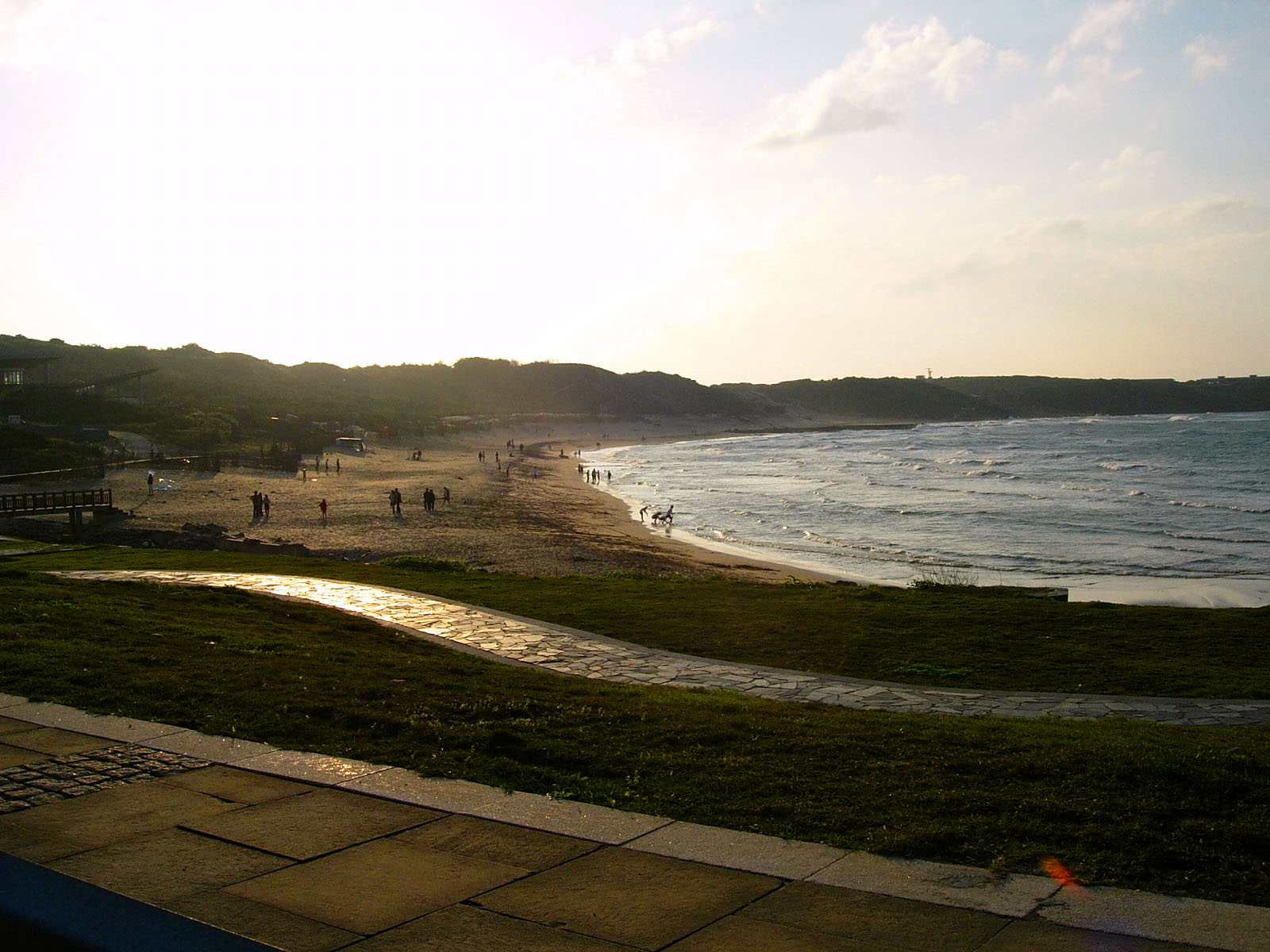
- Beach in Sanzhi

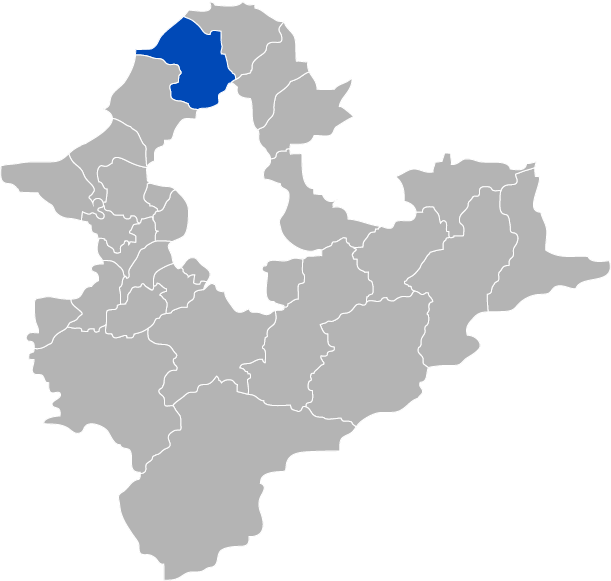
- Sanzhi District in New Taipei City
- Coordinates: 25°14′12″N 121°31′31″E
- Country: Republic of China (Taiwan)
- Region: Northern Taiwan
- Special municipality: New Taipei City

Area
  - Total: 65.9968 km^{2} (25.4815 sq mi)

Population (February 2023)
  - Total: 22,190
- Time zone: UTC+8 (CST)
- Postal code: 252
- Area code: 02
- Website: www.sanzhi.ntpc.gov.tw (in Chinese)

Sanzhi District
- Chinese: 三芝區
Transcriptions
Standard Mandarin
- Hanyu Pinyin: Sānzhī Qū
- Bopomofo: ㄙㄢ ㄓ ㄑㄩ
- Tongyong Pinyin: Sanjhih Cyu
Hakka
- Romanization: Sâm-chṳ Khî
Southern Min
- Hokkien POJ: Sam-chi khu

Sanzhi District (Chinese: 三芝區; pinyin: Sānzhī Qū) is a rural district in northern New Taipei, Taiwan. It is notable as the hometown of the former president Lee Teng-hui.

== History ==
During the period of Japanese rule, Sanshi Village (三芝庄), and was governed under Tamsui District (淡水郡) of Taihoku Prefecture.

== Administrative divisions ==
The district administers thirteen urban villages:

- Baxian (八賢里), Putou (埔頭里), Guzhuang (古庄里), Xinzhuang (新庄里), Puping (埔坪里), Maochang (茂長里), Hengshan (橫山里), Xiban (錫板里), Houcuo (後厝里), Fude (福德里), Yuanshan (圓山里), Dianzi (店子里) and Xinghua (興華里) Village.

== Education ==
- Mackay Medical College
- New Taipei Municipal Sanzhi Junior High School

== Tourist attractions ==
- Li Tien-lu Hand Puppet Historical Museum

== Transportation ==
The main road route through Sanzhi is the Provincial Highway No. 2. There are also a number of county-level highways within the district.

== Notable natives ==
- Chiang Wen-yeh, musician and composer active mainly in Japan and the People's Republic of China
- Lee Teng-hui, former ROC president, spiritual leader of the Taiwan Solidarity Union
- Lu Hsiu-yi, former Democratic Progressive Party politician and member of the Legislative Yuan
- Tseng Wen-hui, former First Lady of the Republic of China, wife of former President Lee Teng-hui
- Tu Tsung-ming, founder of Kaohsiung Medical University and the first Taiwanese PhD

== Climate ==
Climate data for Sanzhi District (2010–2023 normals, extremes 2010–present)
Month	Jan	Feb	Mar	Apr	May	Jun	Jul	Aug	Sep	Oct	Nov	Dec	Year
Record high °C (°F)	27.1 (80.8)	28.2 (82.8)	31.5 (88.7)	31.9 (89.4)	34.9 (94.8)	35.0 (95.0)	40.3 (104.5)	38.5 (101.3)	37.4 (99.3)	35.7 (96.3)	31.7 (89.1)	29.1 (84.4)	40.3 (104.5)
Mean daily maximum °C (°F)	18.1 (64.6)	18.7 (65.7)	21.0 (69.8)	24.3 (75.7)	27.7 (81.9)	30.7 (87.3)	32.8 (91.0)	32.5 (90.5)	30.6 (87.1)	26.5 (79.7)	23.7 (74.7)	19.3 (66.7)	25.5 (77.9)
Daily mean °C (°F)	15.7 (60.3)	15.8 (60.4)	17.9 (64.2)	21.2 (70.2)	24.8 (76.6)	27.7 (81.9)	29.5 (85.1)	29.2 (84.6)	27.7 (81.9)	23.9 (75.0)	21.3 (70.3)	17.0 (62.6)	22.6 (72.8)
Mean daily minimum °C (°F)	13.7 (56.7)	13.6 (56.5)	15.3 (59.5)	18.5 (65.3)	22.3 (72.1)	25.2 (77.4)	26.7 (80.1)	26.5 (79.7)	25.1 (77.2)	22.4 (72.3)	19.4 (66.9)	15.1 (59.2)	20.3 (68.6)
Record low °C (°F)	3.4 (38.1)	6.4 (43.5)	6.9 (44.4)	11.4 (52.5)	14.1 (57.4)	18.7 (65.7)	23.6 (74.5)	23.1 (73.6)	20.4 (68.7)	16.8 (62.2)	11.7 (53.1)	5.9 (42.6)	3.4 (38.1)
Average precipitation mm (inches)	315.4 (12.42)	308.7 (12.15)	213.3 (8.40)	169.8 (6.69)	342.9 (13.50)	271.3 (10.68)	87.5 (3.44)	172.0 (6.77)	190.5 (7.50)	288.8 (11.37)	306.9 (12.08)	458.8 (18.06)	3,125.9 (123.06)
Average precipitation days	17.7	17.3	15.7	13.4	14.0	11.7	6.3	9.7	10.9	14.6	17.0	18.0	166.3
Average relative humidity (%)	81.5	85.1	82.1	80.8	82.5	81.3	76.2	77.5	78.2	78.3	82.5	80.9	80.6
Source 1: Central Weather Administration
Source 2: Atmospheric Science Research and Application Databank (precipitation 2010–2023, precipitation days and humidity 2009–2024)

== See also ==
- New Taipei City
