= Joy English School =

International school franchise

Joy English School is a school franchise with over 450 schools in Taiwan, China, and Japan.

Established by Sam Chen and Peggy Huang in 1981, it is one of the oldest and largest chains of English cram schools on the island of Taiwan. Joy English publishes its own materials to accommodate the needs of kindergarten, elementary, and high school students, as well as students taking the TOEIC.

Joy English has been selected by public and private elementary and junior high schools throughout Taiwan to develop textbooks that are approved by the Ministry of Education.
