= Sagor Bilingual School =

Coordinates: 24.7688°N 120.9662°E

Sagor Bilingual School was founded in 1999 by Taiwanese real estate businessman Glory Yeh. It is located in Hsinchu City, Taiwan in an open-style four-story building located in a gated community.

The school offers full Mandarin-language classes as well as a full English language curriculum given by foreign teachers. This school caters mostly to IT workers from the Hsinchu Science Park who want their children to pursue Chinese education at the same time as an English one. Language Arts classes take up 10 hours a week, plus 3 hours of English Mathematics and 3 hours of English Science.

The school has a track and basketball courts. It also offers ESL and EFL classes after school taught by foreigners.

== See also ==
- Education in Taiwan
