= Hsinchu Municipal Ximen Elementary school =

Hsinchu Municipal Ximen Elementary School 新竹市北區西門國民小學

Location
- #450, Beida Road, North District, Hsinchu City, Taiwan

Information
- Type: Public
- Established: August 1st, 1952
- Principal: Chen Jien Feng

Hsinchu Municipal Ximen Elementary School (Chinese: 新竹市北區西門國民小學; pinyin: Xīnzhú shì běi qū xīmén guómín xiǎoxué) was established on August 1, 1952. The school includes the Chun-Li and other eight school districts. The school is part of the department within the Hsinchu City's Department of Education. The Hsinchu City Department of Education is required to provide nine years of education, upon the laws of the Ministry of Education.

== Staff ==
The school has 111 staff.
