= Taichung Municipal Cingshuei Senior High School =

School in Taichung, Taiwan

- 臺中市立清水高級中等學校
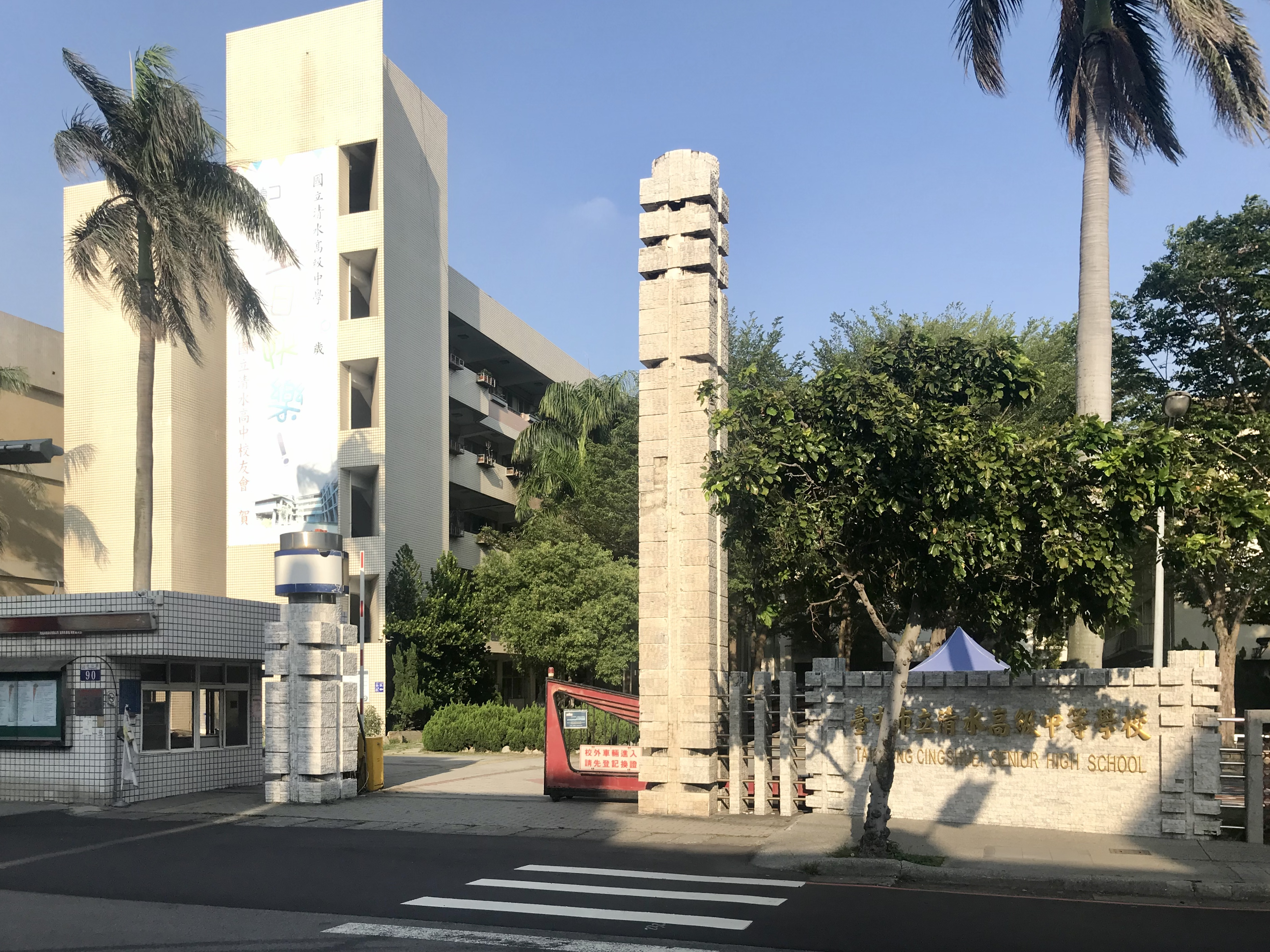

Location
- No. 90, Zhongshan Rd., Qingshui Dist. Taichung City; 43653; Taiwan; 24.259503°N 120.572825°E

Information
- Type: Public
- Motto: 誠正勤樸
- Established: 1946
- Principal: Jian-Hua, Xiao（蕭建華）
- Grades: Grade 10 to 12
- Enrollment: 1,679 (2019)
- Campus size: 35,575 m^{2} (8.791 acres)
- Campus type: Suburb
- Website: www.cshs.tc.edu.tw

Taichung Municipal Cingshuei Senior High School
- Traditional Chinese: 臺中市立清水高級中等學校
Transcriptions
Standard Mandarin
- Hanyu Pinyin: Táizhōng Shìlì Qīngshuǐ Gāojí Zhōngděng Xuéxiào
Southern Min
- Hokkien POJ: Tâi-tiong Chhī-li̍p Tshing-tsuí Ko-kip Tiong-tēng Ha̍k-hāu

The Taichung Municipal Cingshuei Senior High School (Chinese: 臺中市立清水高級中等學校; pinyin: Táizhōng Shìlì Qīngshuǐ Gāojí Zhōngděng Xuéxiào) is the only public high school in Qingshui District, Taichung, Taiwan. It has 1679 pupils in 42 classes.

== History ==
The school was founded in March 1946 named Taichung County Cingshuei High School.

In 1952, the school was transferred to the Taiwan Provincial Government, and renamed Taiwan Provincial Cingshuei High School.

In 1968, renamed Taiwan Provincial Cingshuei Senior High School.

In 2000, due to the "Government Reformation" the school was managed by the central government under Ministry of Education, and renamed National Cingshuei Senior High School.

In 2017, the school was transferred to the Taichung City Government, and renamed Taichung Municipal Cingshuei Senior School.

== Famous Alumni ==
- Paul Ching Wu Chu
- Chen Wen-tsuen
- Robert Tsao
- Peter Tsai
- Liao I-chiu
- Li Jing (TV presenter)
- Tsai Chi-chang

== See also ==
- Education in Taiwan
