= Caotun =

Urban township in Nantou County, Taiwan

Coordinates: 23.983°N 120.7326°E

Caotun Township 草屯鎮
- Urban township
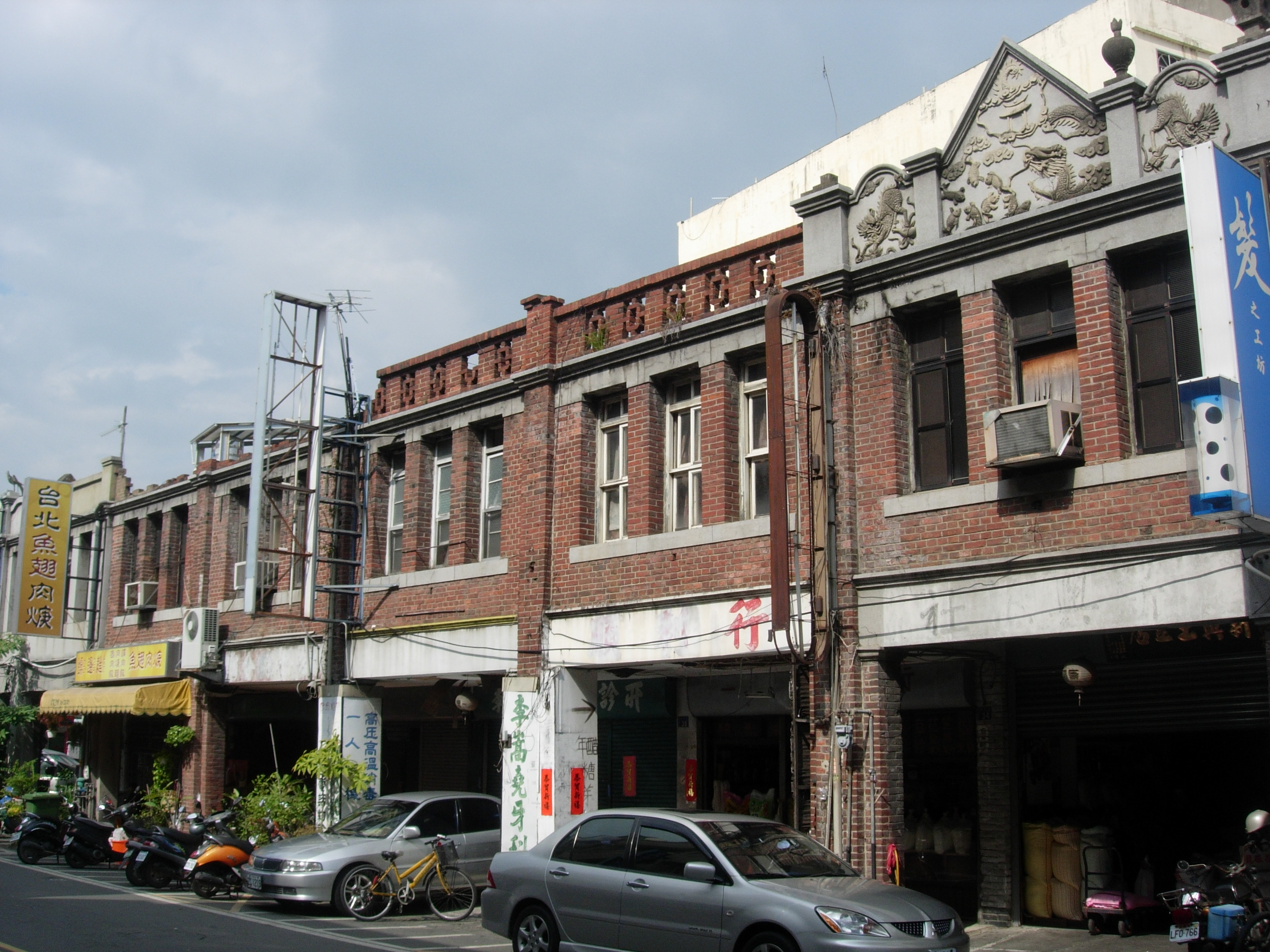
- The old town of Caotun

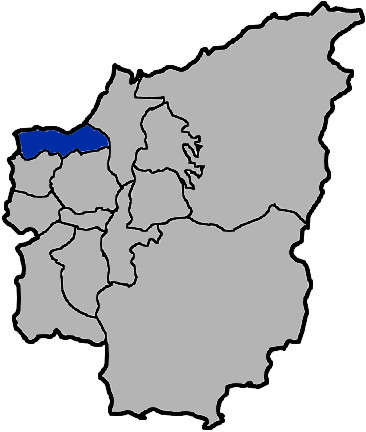
- Caotun Township in Nantou County
- Location: Nantou County, Taiwan

Government
  - Type: Urban township

Area
  - Total: 104 km^{2} (40 sq mi)

Population (February 2023)
  - Total: 96,838

Caotun Township
- Chinese: 草屯鎮
- Hanyu Pinyin: Cǎotún Zhèn
- Wade–Giles: Ts'ao^{3}-t'un^{2} Chen^{4}
- Pha̍k-fa-sṳ: Tshó-thùn-tsṳ́n
- Hokkien POJ: Chháu-tūn-tìn

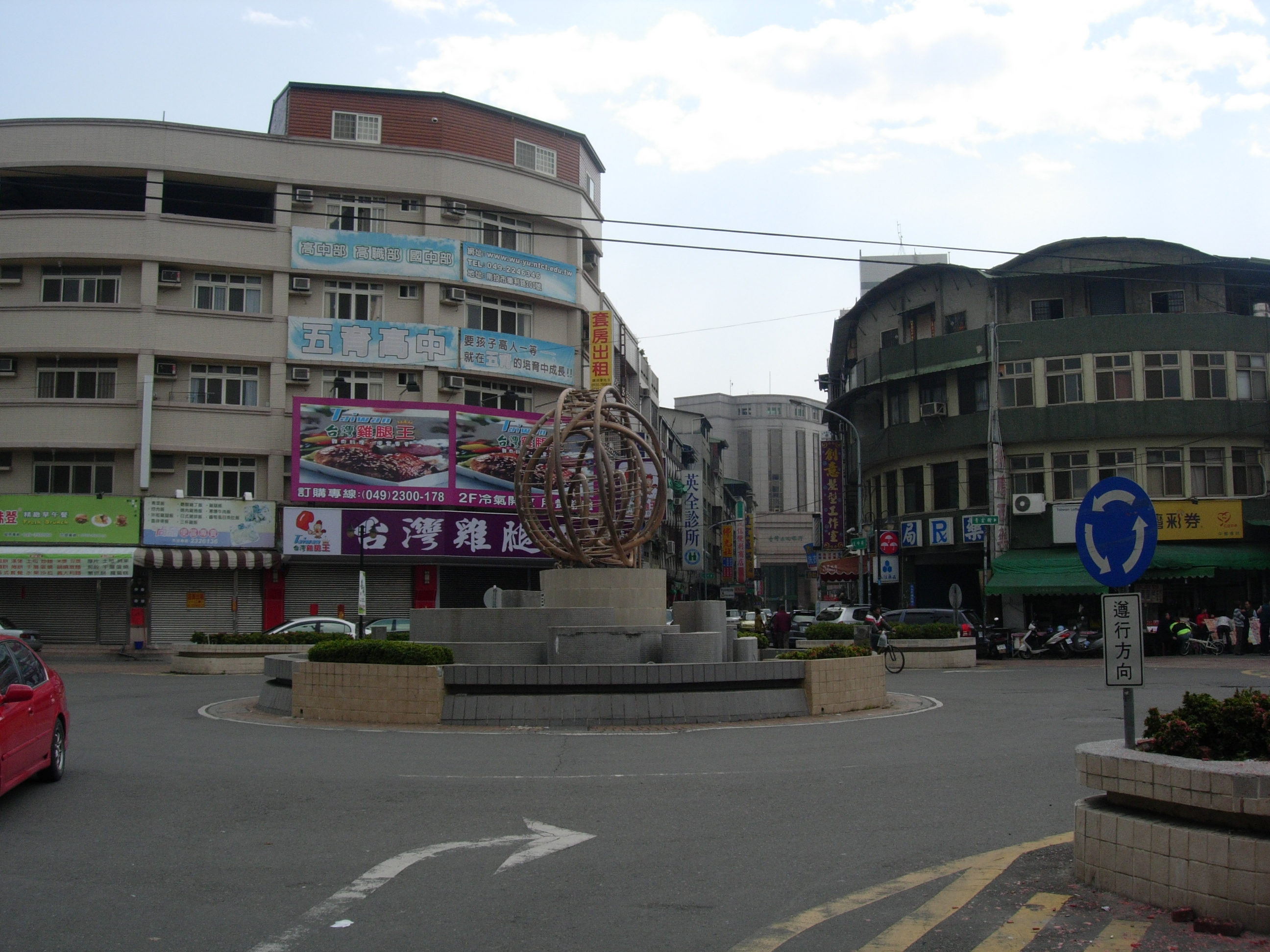
Downtown Caotun

Caotun Township, formerly transliterated as Tsaotun Township, is an urban township in the northwest of Nantou County, Taiwan. It is the largest township in Taiwan by population.

== History ==
The area was historically known as Chháu-ê-tun (草鞋墩) with the present name adopted under Japanese rule in 1920.

== Administrative divisions ==
The township comprises 27 villages: Beishi, Beitou, Bifeng, Bizhou, Duihe, Fuliao, Fuxing, Heping, Jialao, Mingzheng, Nanpu, Pingding, Pinglin, Shanglin, Shanjiao, Shichuan, Shuangdong, Tucheng, Xincuo, Xinfeng, Xinzhuang, Yanfeng, Yufeng, Yushi, Zhongshan, Zhongyuan and Zhongzheng.

== Education ==
- Nan Kai University of Technology
- National Caotun Commercial & Industrial Vocational Senior High School

== Tourist attractions ==
- Caotun Night Market
- Jiujiufeng
- Taiwan Times Village
- Yu-hsiu Museum of Art

== Transportation ==
The nearest train station to Caotun is the Yuanlin Station of the Taiwan Railway Administration in Changhua County.

The Taichung City Bus route 108 reaches Nan Kai University of Technology, however 10km+10 TWD promotion are only applied to Taichung residents and eligible persons.

== Notable natives ==
- Hsieh Ming-yu, singer and songwriter
- Tsai Ping-kun, Deputy Mayor of Taipei
- Wu Den-yih, Vice President of the Republic of China (2012-2016)
