= New Taipei Municipal ShiDing High School =

High School

Coordinates: 25°00′48″N 121°38′34″E

New Taipei Shiding Municipal High School
- 新北市立石碇高級中學

Location
- No. 45 Baifenliao, Shiding District, New Taipei City, Taiwan; Shiding District, New Taipei City

Information
- Established: 1968
- Area: around 13 kilometers squared
- Website: https://www.sdhs.ntpc.edu.tw/ https://sites.google.com/sdhs.ntpc.edu.tw/shidinghighschool/

New Taipei Municipal ShiDing High School (SDHS; Chinese: 新北市立石碇高級中學) is a senior high school in metropolitan Taipei.

== SDHS Historical Development ==
- In early 1968, Taiwan Provincial Government assigned Jin-Yin Song, the Principal of Wenshan Junior High School, as preparation director.
- Principal Tao Qian served as first principal on August 1, 1968. Initially, students from ShiDing and Shenkeng townships were also collected and classrooms of Shenkeng Elementary School were temporarily borrowed for the use of teaching.
- Taiwan Provincial Government approved No. 45, Bafenliao, Shiding Dist. as the school site.
- Five principals, namely Chu-Hsin Kuo, Feng-Chang Li, Yong Chen, Dai-Wei Chen and Hsiu-Chin Ku, successively took up the post.
- Permission was received for preparing to reform into a completed high school, which had been undertaken by Principal Chun-Kuang Hsueh.
- After permission had been received for reforming into a completed high school, Principal Ming-Yung Cheng became the first principal.
- Permission was received for conducting comprehensive high school curriculum by which programs of applied information technology and applied foreign languages have been developed.
- After renaming as Taipei County ShiDing High School by High School Law, it is currently a comprehensive high school.
- Director Ku-Heng Chiang became principal after Emeritus Principal Ming-Yung Cheng.
- Principal Jung-Tung Li, the second principal after the reform, formally retired.
- Principal Wu-Hung Ke, the third principal after the reform, formally retired.
- Principal Hsiu-Wen Liu became the current principal.

== See also ==
- Education in Taiwan
