= Dali District =

District in Taichung, Taiwan

Coordinates: 24°05′30″N 120°41′30″E

Dali 大里區
- District
- Dali District
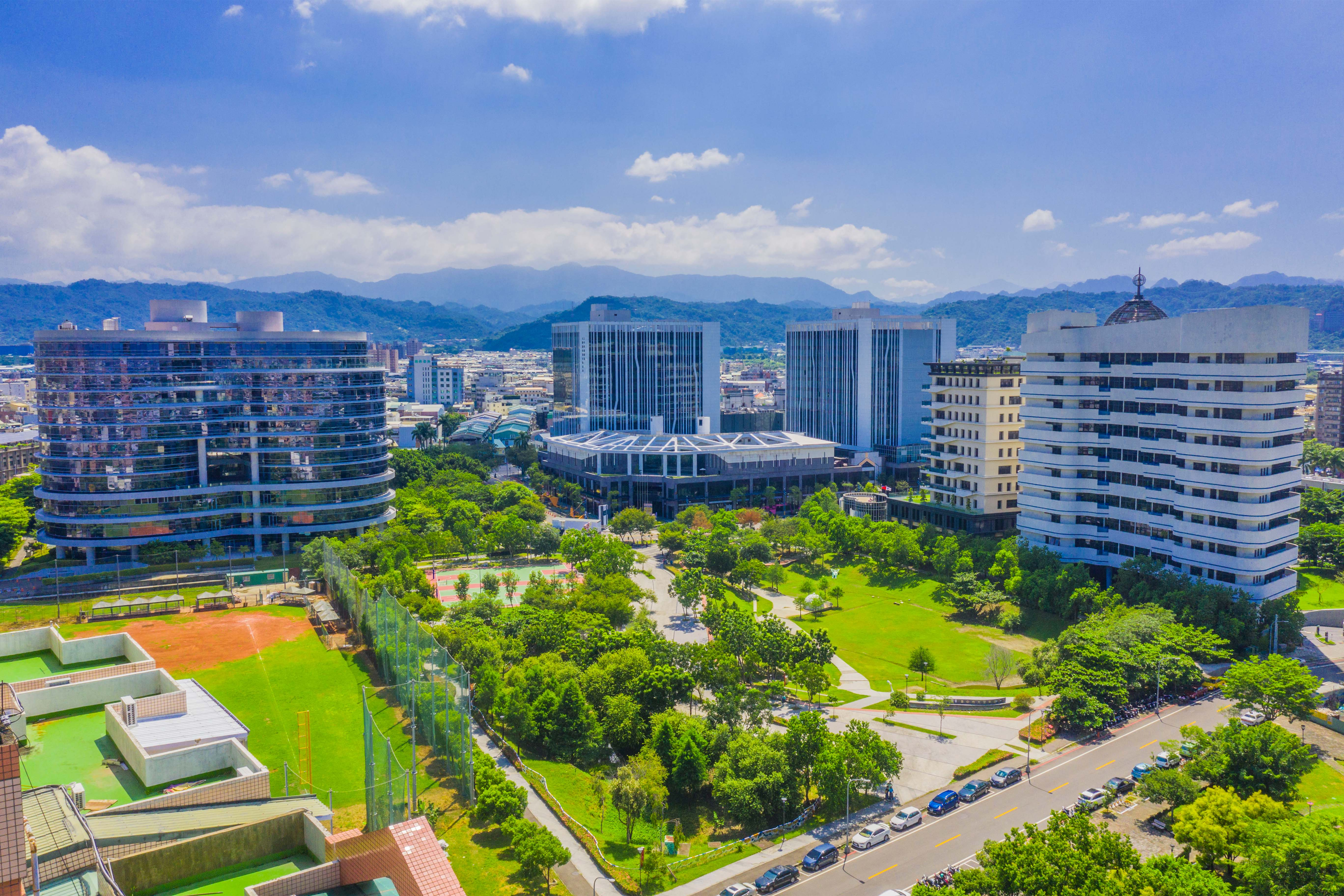
- Taichung Software Park aerial photograph

- Location in Taichung
- Country: Taiwan
- Special municipality: Taichung

Area
  - Total: 28.88 km^{2} (11.15 sq mi)

Population (February 2023)
  - Total: 211,861
- Time zone: UTC+8
- Website: www.dali.taichung.gov.tw (in Chinese)

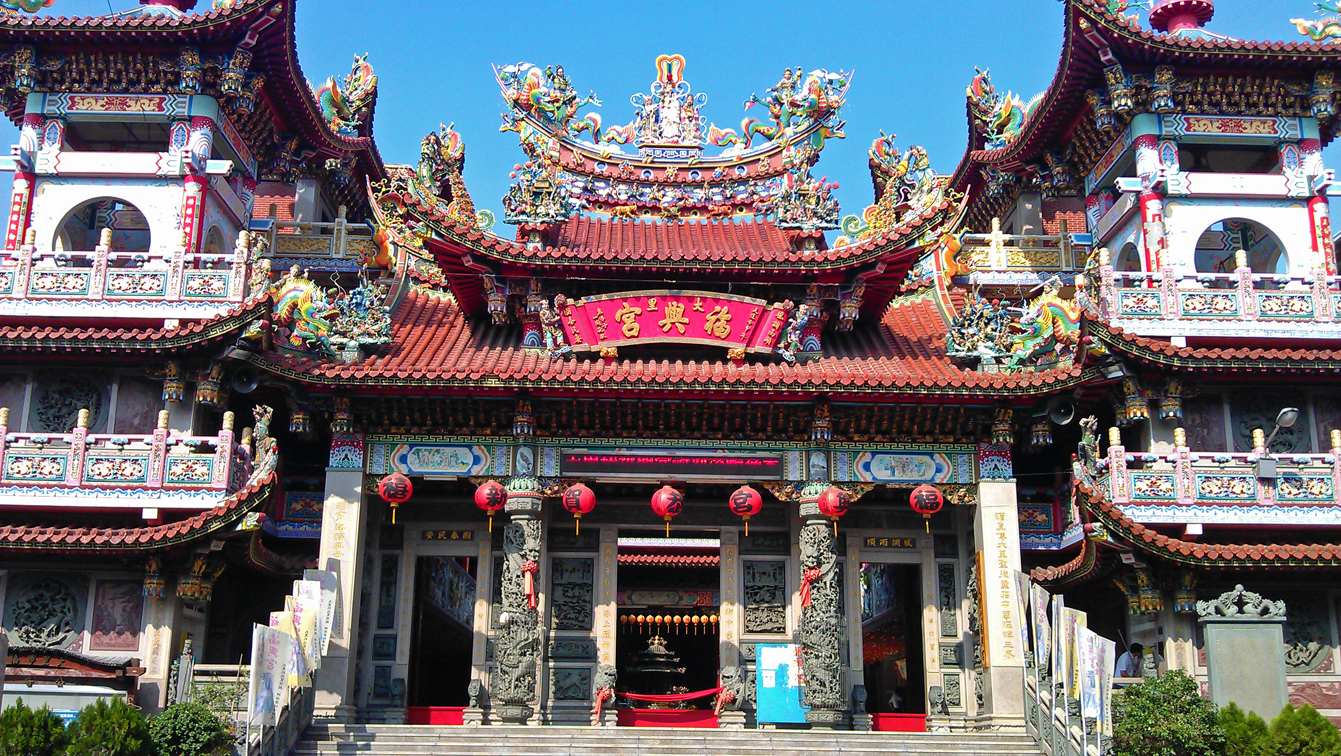
Daliyi Fuxing Temple

Dali District (Chinese: 大里區; pinyin: Dàlǐ Qū) is an inner city district in Taichung, Taiwan.

== Name ==
The name "Dali" originates from Tai-li-khit (Chinese: 大里杙; Pe̍h-ōe-jī: Tāi-lí-khi̍t), where Tai-li refers to the Hoanya aborigines and khit refers to a bamboo raft's toon. The word "khit" (Chinese: 杙; Pe̍h-ōe-jī: Khi̍t) means a tiny wooden post, referring to the time as a port city.

== History ==
After the handover of Taiwan from Japan to the Republic of China in 1945, Dali was organized as a rural township of Taichung County. On 1 November 1993, Dali was upgraded to a county-administered city due to its population. On 25 December 2010, Taichung County was merged with Taichung City and Dali was upgraded to a district of the city.

== Administrative divisions ==
The current administrative divisions can be traced back to the 1920s under the Japanese administration, during which the local government set the village, (Ōsato village (大里庄, Ōsato sō)), under the Taiton district, Taichū Shyō (臺中州, Taichū Shyō) (Taichung today).

At first, the village has eight villages. After the handover of Taiwan from Japan, it has changed into Dali Township (大里鄉) under Taichung Country. On 1 November 1993, Dali Township changed into Dali City (大里市). In 2010, the city was renamed into Dali District under the newly founded Taichung City.

There are 27 villages with 767 alleys in the district. Each villages are:

Tunghu, Xihu, Dali, Xinli, Guoguang, Shuwang, Xiangxing, Neixin, Zhongxin, Tungsheng, Dayuan, Jiatian, Renhua, Rende, Jianmin, Tucheng, Tungxing, Daming, Yonglong, Rixin, Xirong, Zhangrong, Jincheng, Liren, Lide, Xinren and Ruicheng Village.

== Education ==
=== Universities ===
- Hsiuping University of Science and Technology

=== Junior high schools ===
- Cheng Kong Junior High School

=== Senior high schools ===
- The Affiliated Senior High School of National Chung Hsing University
- Taichung county of Dali senior High School
- Ta ming senior High School
- Chito tai senior High School
- Youth senior High School
- Lizen senior High School

== Economy ==
- Taichung Software Park
- Dali Industrial Park

== Tourist attractions ==
- Museum of Fiber Arts, Taichung
- Taichung software park Dali art plaza
- Daliyi old street
- Daliyi Fuxing Temple
- Mayfun Taro ice
- Taichung City Dali Civil Sports Center

== Transportation ==
- NH3(209)
- Provincial Highway No.3
- Provincial Highway No.63
- Provincial Highway No.74
- County route No.129

== Hospital ==
- Jen-Ai Hospital
- Bodhi Hospital
- Wufeng Cheng Ching Hospital
