= Hsiuping University of Science and Technology =

Private university in Dali, Taichung, Taiwan

- 修平科技大學
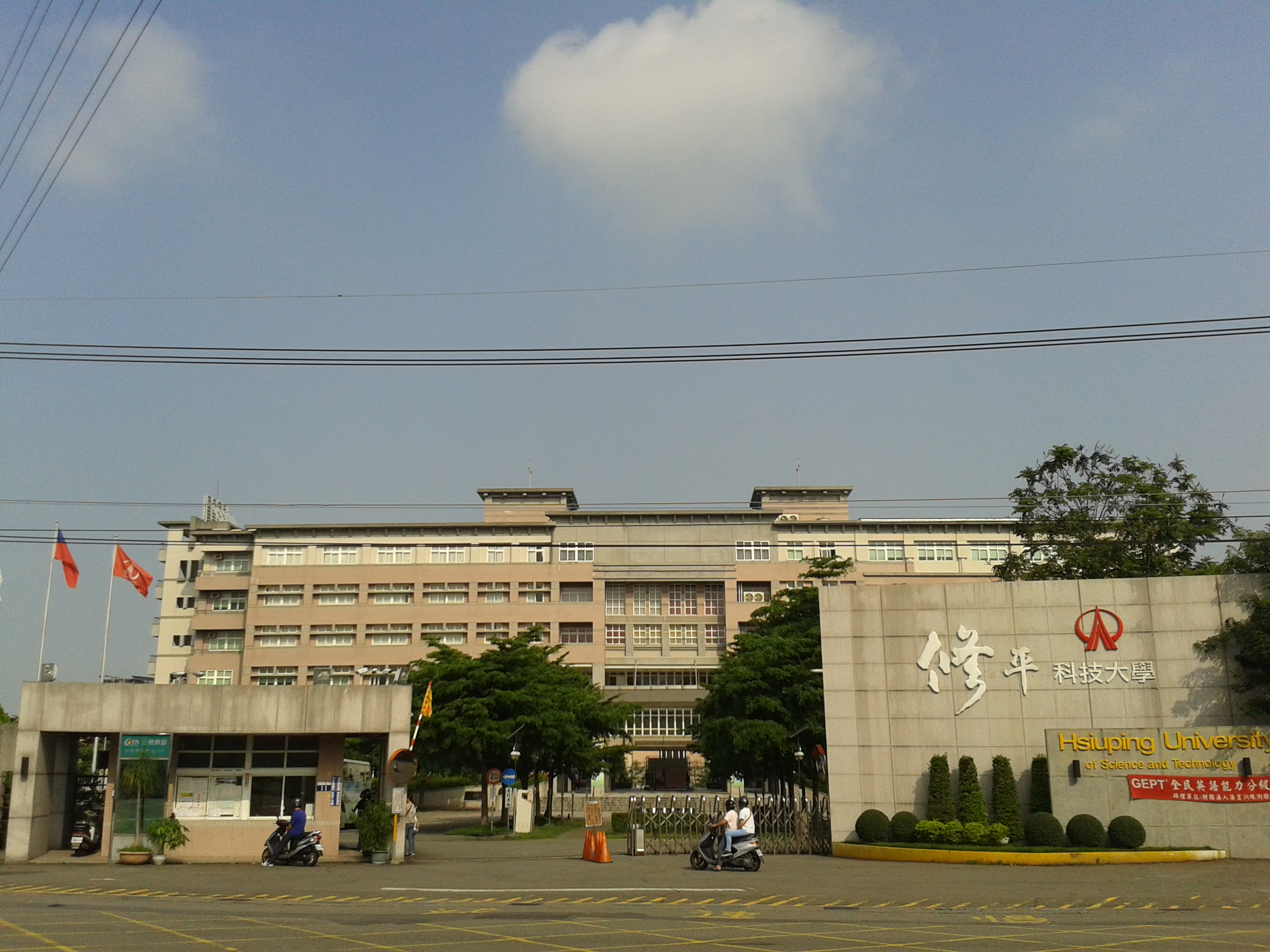
- Type: private
- Established: 1965 (as Shu-Teh Junior College of Home Economics); 2011 (as HUST)
- Location: Dali, Taichung, Taiwan; 24.0969°N 120.7116°E
- Website: Official website

Hsiuping University of Science and Technology
- Traditional Chinese: 修平科技大學
- Simplified Chinese: 修平科技大学
Transcriptions
Standard Mandarin
- Hanyu Pinyin: Xiūpíng Kējì Dàxué
Southern Min
- Hokkien POJ: Siu-pêng Kho-ki Tāi-ha̍k

The Hsiuping University of Science and Technology (HUST; Chinese: 修平科技大學; Pe̍h-ōe-jī: Siu-pêng Kho-ki Tāi-ha̍k) is a private university in Dali District, Taichung, Taiwan.

HUST offers a wide range of academic programs, including undergraduate and graduate degrees in Engineering, Business, Humanities, Social Sciences, and Health Sciences.

The university has eight colleges, including the College of Engineering, the College of Management, the College of Humanities and Social Sciences, and the College of Health Sciences.

== History ==
HUST was originally established as Shu-Teh Junior College of Home Economics in 1965. In 1970, it was renamed to Shu-Teh Junior College of Technology. In 1994, it was again renamed to Shu-Teh Junior College of Technology and Commerce. In 2000, the ROC Minister of Education finally recognized the college as Hsiuping Institute of Technology and finally as Hsiuping University of Science and Technology in 2011.

== Faculties ==
- College of Engineering
- College of Humanities and Creativity
- College of Management
- International College

== See also ==
- List of universities in Taiwan
