= Kainan University =

University in Luzhu, Taoyuan City, Taiwan

- 開南大學
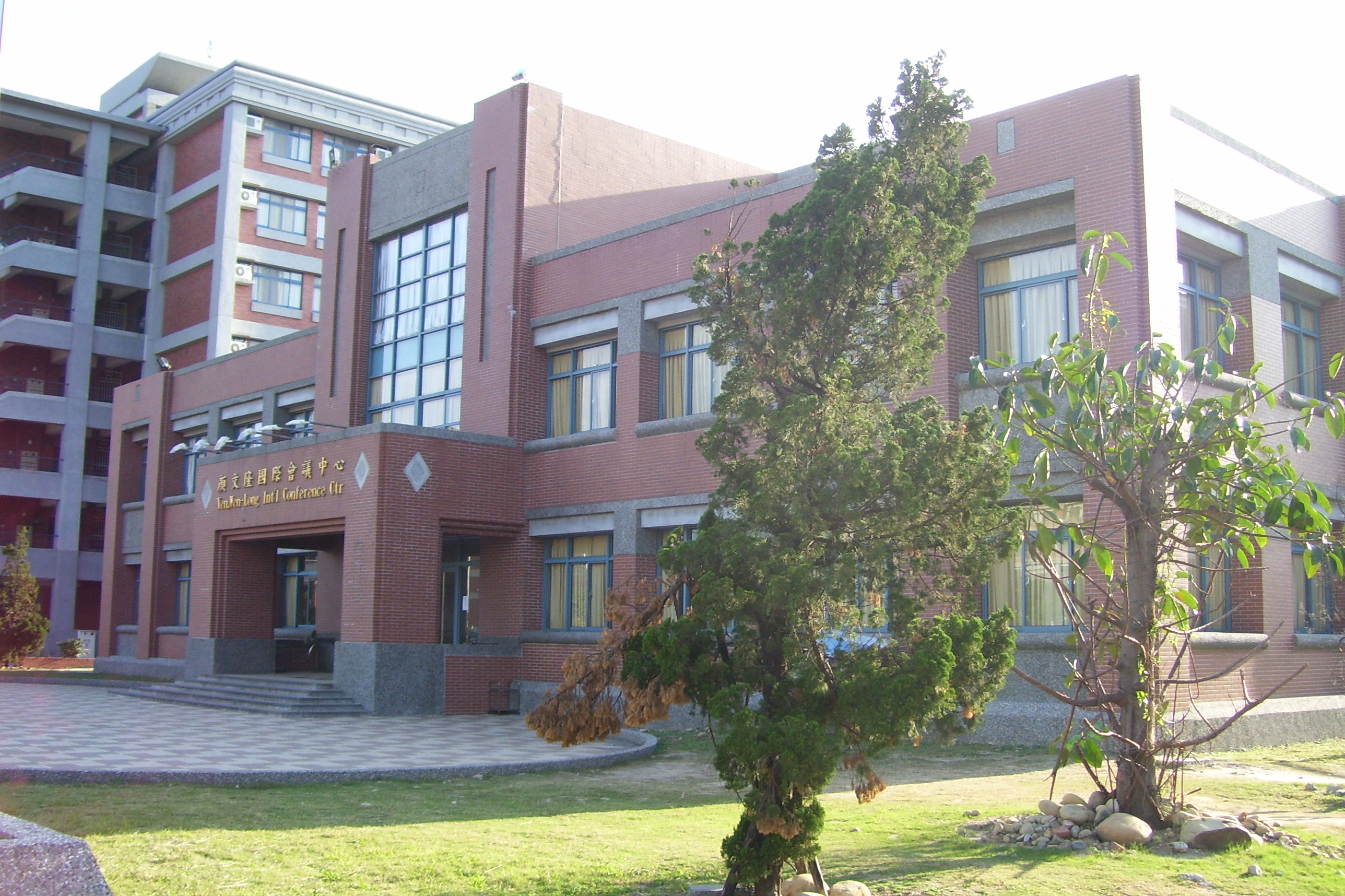
- Motto: 至誠、卓越、自由、豪邁
- Motto in English: Sincere, Excellence, Freedom and Vigorous
- Type: Private
- Established: 1917
- President: Pearl Lin
- Location: No.1 Kainan Road, Luzhu Dist, Taoyuan City 33857, Taiwan, 338 R.O.C. 25.0126°N 121.2698°E
- Website: knu.edu.tw

Chinese name
- Simplified Chinese: 开南大学
- Traditional Chinese: 開南大學
Transcriptions
Standard Mandarin
- Hanyu Pinyin: Kāinán Dàxué
Southern Min
- Hokkien POJ: Khai-lâm Tāi-ha̍k

Kainan University (KNU; Chinese: 開南大學; pinyin: Kāinán Dàxué; Pe̍h-ōe-jī: Khai-lâm Tāi-ha̍k) is a private university in Taoyuan, Taiwan.

KNU was founded as Kainan Commercial and Technical High School in 1917. In January 1990, the school was upgraded to Kainan Institute of Technology. Finally in April 2006, the school became Kainan University.

Kainan University offers a wide range of undergraduate and graduate programs in various fields, including business, communication, design, law, and hospitality. The university also has a Chinese Language Center that offers courses in Mandarin Chinese for international students.

== Academics ==
=== School of Business ===
- Master Program Of Business
- International Honors Program （English Lesson）
- Department Of Business and Entrepreneurial Management
- Department Of International Business

=== School of Informatics ===
- Department of information management
- Department of Film and Creative Media

=== School of Tourism and Transportation ===
- Master Program of School of Tourism and Transportation (Tourism and Leisure)
- Master program of school of tourism and transportation (international transportation)
- Department of international Logistics and transportation management
- Department of tourism & Hospitality management
- Department of air transportation
- Department of leisure and Recreation management

=== School of Humanities and Social Sciences ===
- Department of Law
- Department of Public Affairs and Management
- Department of Applied English
- Department of applied Japanese
- Department of applied Chinese
- School of Healthcare Management
- Graduate school of health care technology
- Department of Nutrition and Health Sciences
- Department of Health Industry Management

== International program ==
=== 2 + 2 dual degree ===
==== KNU and University of Wisconsin-River Falls (UW-RF) dual degree program ====
The University of Wisconsin-River Falls was founded in 1874 as the fourth State Normal School in Wisconsin and the first in the northwestern part of the state. Its first building was dedicated on Sept. 2, 1875. KNU has established the Teachers of English to Speakers of Other Languages (TESOL), the dual degree programs with University of Wisconsin, River Ralls, to administer overseas academic cooperation, improve and reinforce exchange studies from overseas university.

==== KNU and University of Toyama dual degree program ====
The University of Toyama was founded in 1949 and located in Toyama City of Toyama Prefecture, the center of Japan. It is surrounded by the Tateyama mountain range and the Sea of Japan. The University of Toyama is a university comprising three former national universities; Toyama University, Toyama Medical and Pharmaceutical University and Takaoka National College were integrated in 2005. This integrated university houses eight faculties, six graduate schools, the University Laboratory, Hospital, and Library, and 12 institutes such as the Center for International Education and Research. There are approximately 9,253 students (including 8,163 undergraduate and 1,091 graduate students) studying at the university.

== KNU life ==
=== Campus activities ===
- Orientation events
- International-culture festival
- Thanksgiving/ Halloween/ X’mas party
- Off-Campus Visit
- Student Clubs
  - Kainan Baseball Team
  - International Student Association (ISA)
  - Cheerleading team

== KNU main international sister schools ==
- Dankook University (South Korea)
- Indian Institutes of Management (India)
- Kindai University (Japan)
- New York Film Academy (US)
- University of Toyama (Japan)
- University of Wisconsin-River Falls (US)
- San Diego State University (US)

== Facilities ==
=== Library ===
The Kainan University Library has a floor area of more than 12,000 m^{2} (130,000 sq ft) and is able to hold more than half a million books. To meet the needs of students and faculties at the university, the library has collected books, periodicals, databases, e-journals resources and audiovisual materials in a wide range of fields such as management, social science, natural science, law, logistics, humanities and healthcare. The volume of books in collection at present is more than 300,000, the periodicals including Chinese, English and Japanese academic journals and magazines are nearly 22,000, which makes Kainan Library one of the larger library collections among private universities in Taiwan.

=== Dormitory ===
- Student Resident Hall 1 : public bathroom / quadruple room
- Student Resident Hall 2 : private bathroom / quadruple room

=== Others ===
- ATM
- post office
- shuttle bus
- ubike
