= Kaohsiung Municipal Ruei-Siang Senior High School =

Coordinates: 22°36.05′N 120°19.27′E

Kaohsiung Municipal Rueisiang Senior High School
- 高雄市立瑞祥高級中學

Location
- No. 63, Banchao Road, Cianjhen; Kaohsiung, 80652; Taiwan

Information
- Type: Municipal public Comprehensive Junior-Senior High School
- Motto: Active Learning
- Established: 1983
- Principal: 林香吟
- Grades: 7~12 grade
- Enrollment: over 3000
- Magazine: Ruei-Siang Literature and Art (瑞祥文藝)
- Website: www.rssh.kh.edu.tw

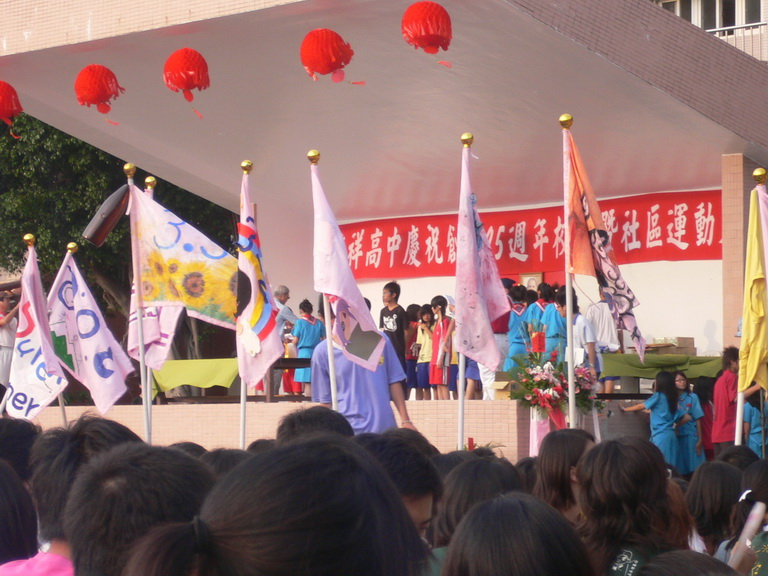
25th Anniversary and the Sports Games of Ruei-Siang High School on April 12, 2008

The Kaohsiung Municipal Rueisiang Senior High School (RSSH; Chinese: 高雄市立瑞祥高級中學) is a senior high school located at Cianjhen District, Kaohsiung, Taiwan, is the first comprehensive junior-senior high school (完全中學) of Kaohsiung City.

== History ==
The school first opened as a public junior high school in 1972. It was renamed Ruei-Siang Senior High School in 1983.

In 2023, Rueisiang High School established a sister school relationship with Osaka Prefectural Higashi High School at Higashiosaka College.

== Principal ==
- Mr. Chao, Lian-Chu (趙連出) 1983-2004
- Mr. Wu, Tse-Min (吳澤民) 2004-2011
- 林香吟 2011-
- 莊訓當

== School motto ==
- Be sincere 敦
- Be moral 品
- Be strongly encouraging 勵
- Be learning actively 學

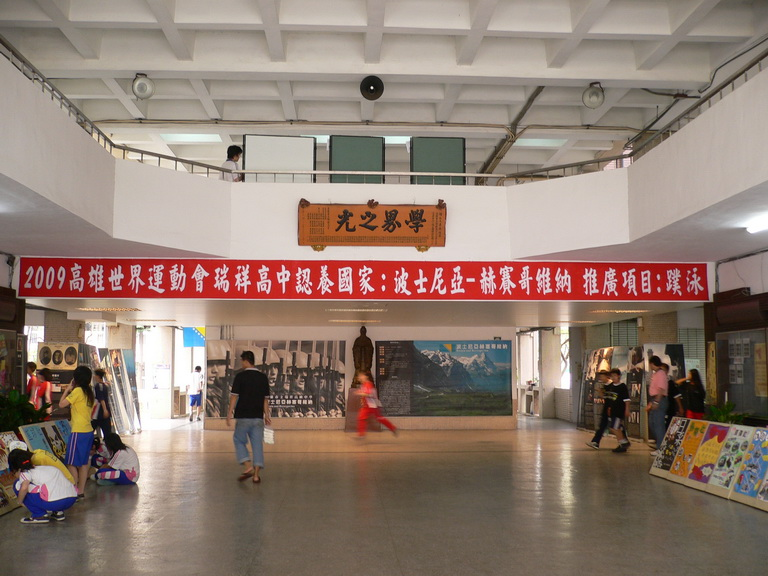
Campus of Ruei-Siang High School

== Transportation ==
The school is accessible within walking distance south of Lizihnei Station of Kaohsiung LRT.
