= Affiliated Senior High School of National Kaohsiung Normal University =

Coordinates: 22°37′33.70″N 120°19′21.10″E

The Affiliated Senior High School of National Kaohsiung Normal University
- 高雄師範大學附屬高級中學
- No. 89, Kaisyuan 2nd Road, Lingya District, Kaohsiung City; Taiwan

Information
- Type: Public High School
- Motto: Chinese: 仁愛，愛國，民主，進步 (Benevolence, patriotism, democracy, progress)
- Established: 1978
- Principal: Ou Chih-Chang (歐志昌)
- Grades: 1~12
- Gender: Male & female
- Campus: 1.8 hectares (4.4 acres)
- Website: www.nknush.kh.edu.tw

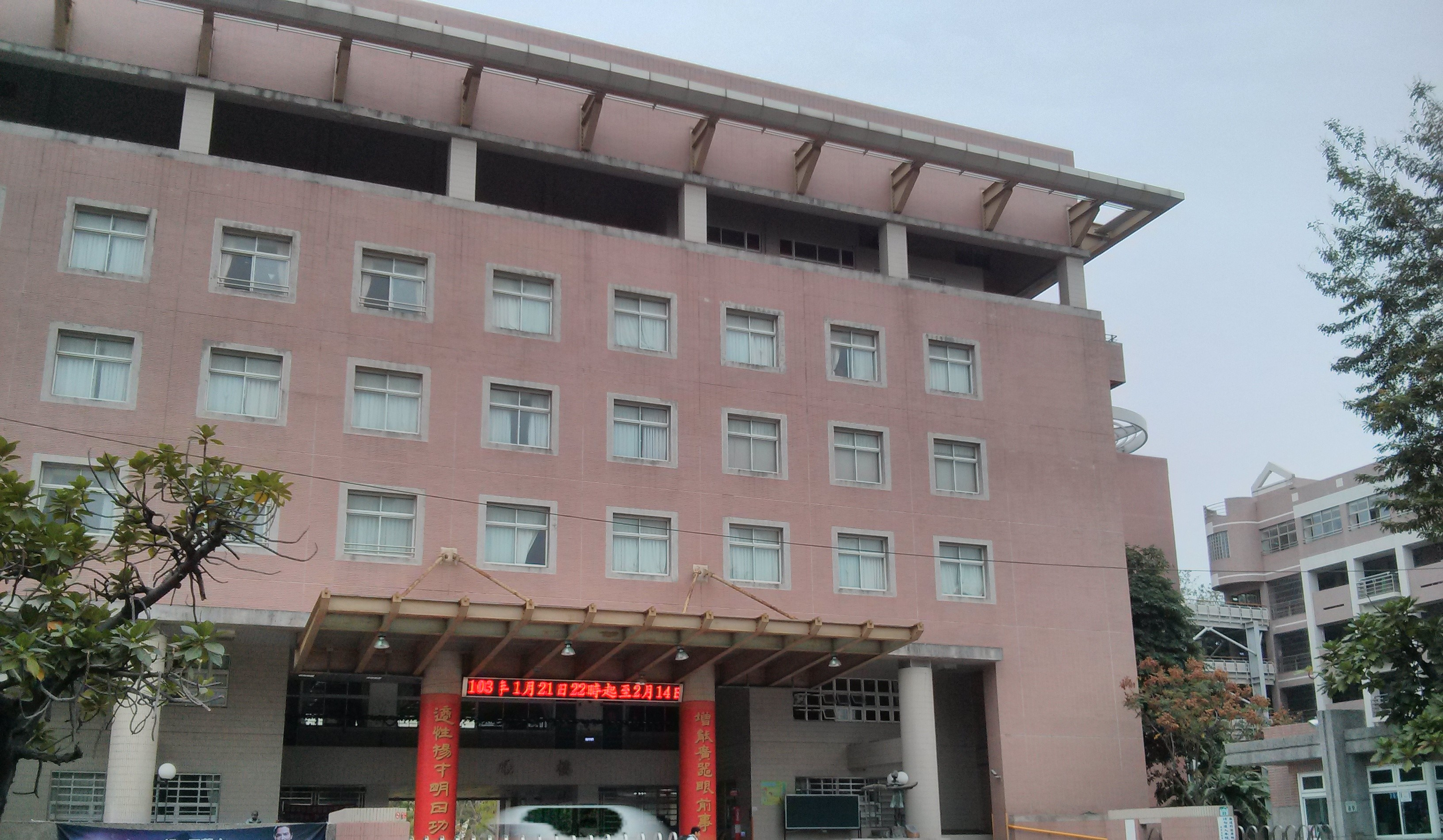
Affiliated Senior High School of National Kaohsiung Normal University

The Affiliated Senior High School of National Kaohsiung Normal University (NKNUASHS; Chinese: 國立高雄師範大學附屬高級中學; pinyin: Guólì Gāoxióng Shīfàn Dàxué Fùshǔ Gāojí Zhōngxué) is a public high school located in Lingya District, Kaohsiung, Taiwan. It has eight classes per grades for senior high level, four classes per grades for junior high, and one class per grades for elementary students. The campus of the school is enclosed by National Kaohsiung Normal University. At the present, NKNUASHS is one of the top high schools of Kaohsiung City.

== History ==
The school was established in 1978 as Taiwan Provincial Kaohsiung Teachers' College Affiliated Experimental School (台灣省立高雄師範學院附屬實驗學校). In 1980 the school name was changed to National Kaohsiung Teachers' College Affiliated Senior High School (國立高雄師範學院附屬高級中學). In 1989 the school name was changed to The Affiliated Senior High School of National Kaohsiung Normal University (國立高雄師範大學附屬高級中學).

=== Principals ===
There have been nine different principals:

1. Mao Lien-wen
2. Chou Chi-wen (Aug 1978 – Jul 1988)
3. Chang Chiu-hsiung (Aug 1988 – Jul 1994)
4. Luo Wen-chi (Aug 1994 – Jul 1995)
5. Chung Wei-chi (Aug 1995 – Jul 1999)
6. Tsai Chung-ming (Aug 1999 – Jul 2003)
7. Tsai Tien-mo (Aug 2003 – Jan 2008)
8. Tso Tai-cheng (Jan 2008 – Jul 2011)
9. Li Chin-yang (Aug 2011 – Jul 2015)
10. Cheng Pu-wu (Aug 2015 – Jul 2017)
11. Li Chin-yang (Aug 2017 – present)

== Extra-curricular activities ==
There are exciting activities and interesting clubs in the school for junior and senior high school students.

=== Intramurals ===
- swimming
- marathon
- volleyball
- basketball
- table tennis
- tug-of-war

=== Sports teams ===
- swimming team
- basketball team
- bicycle team
- track and fields team

=== Clubs ===
- volunteer
- computer
- mass communication
- comics
- volleyball
- debate
- astronomy
- girls basketball
- film
- boys basketball
- dancing
- softball
- magic
- music

== Uniform ==
The school uniform of NKNUASHS.

=== Uniform for Senior High Students ===
Girls: White shirt with light blue skirt.

Boys: White shirt with navy blue trousers.

=== Uniform for Junior High Students ===
Girls: White shirt with navy blue skirt.

Boys: White shirt with navy blue shorts or trousers.

== Facilities ==
=== Buildings ===
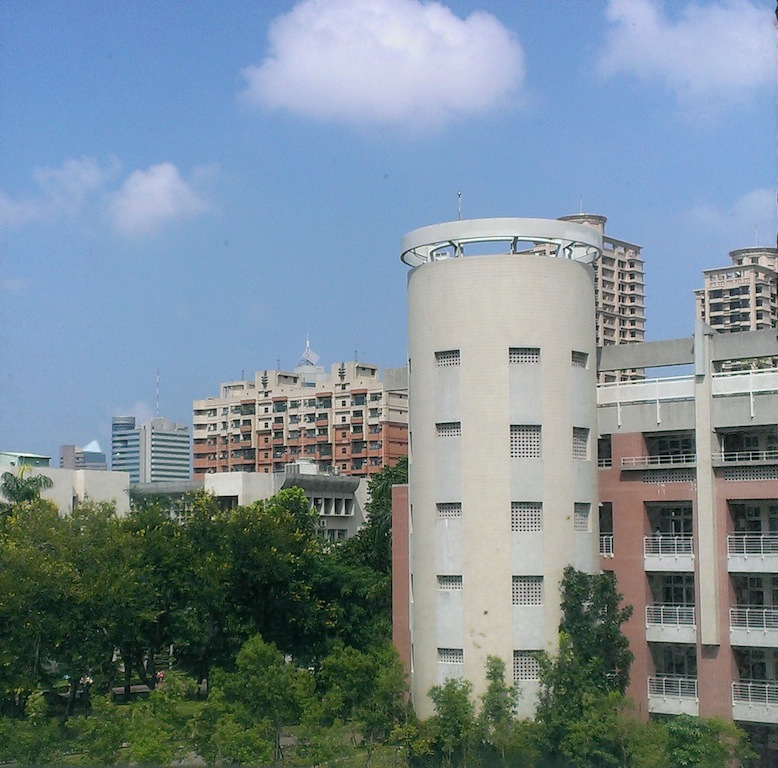
ASHS Bei Chen Building

There are four buildings in the school:

1. Chen Xi Building: Administrative building, contains music classrooms.
2. Bei Chen Building: Contains high school students' classrooms.
3. Juan Yong Building: This building is for junior high classrooms, computer classrooms, and the science labs.
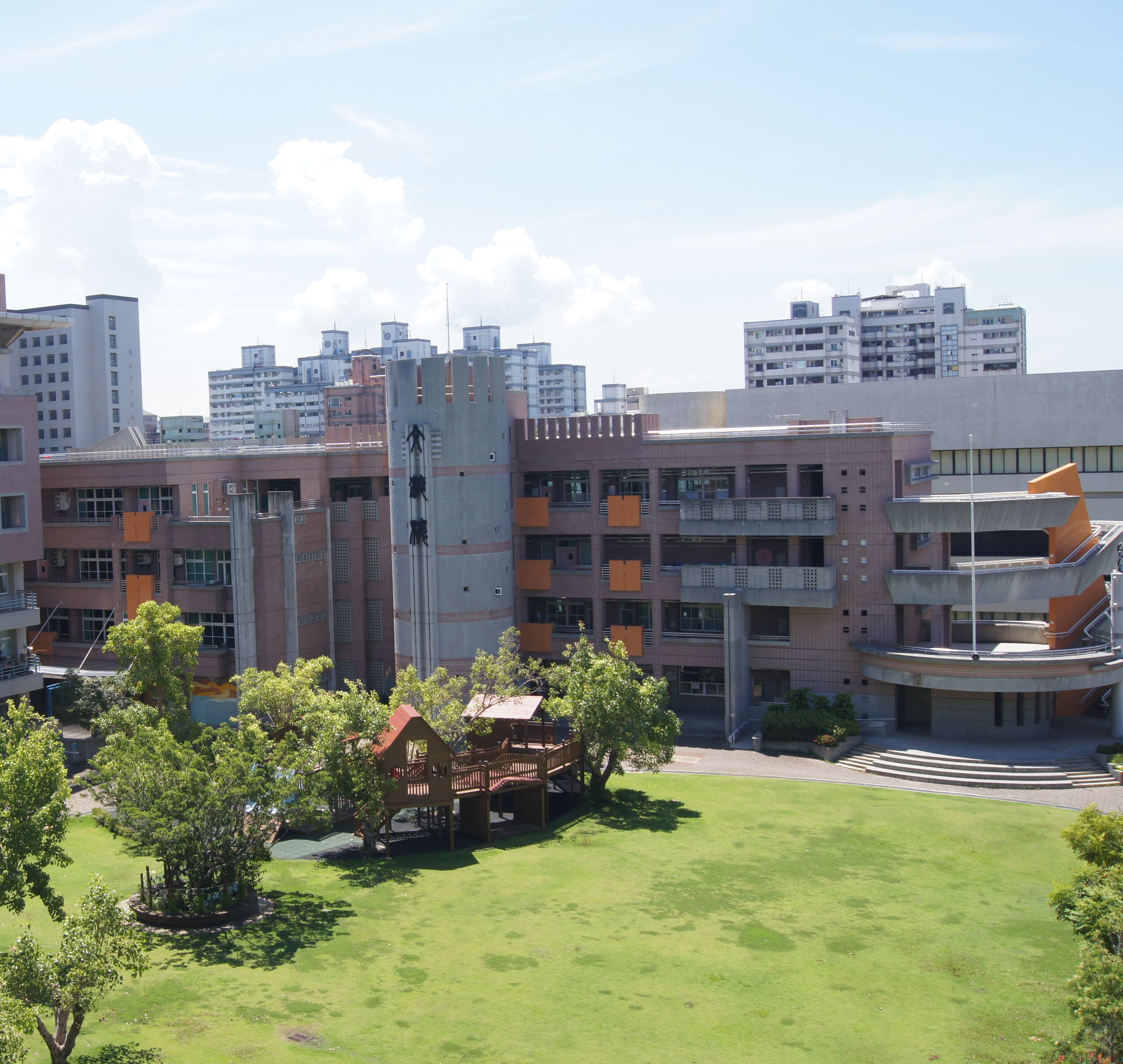
4. Wen Fu Building of NKNUASHS
  Wen Fu Building: Contains elementary students' classrooms, art classrooms, and home economics classrooms.

=== School yard ===
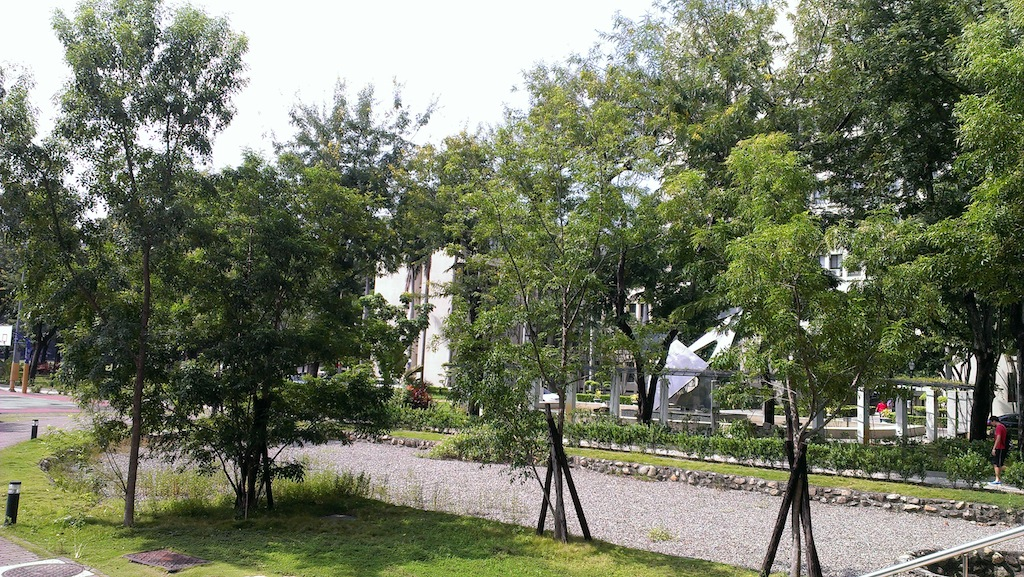
ASHS schoolyard

There is a playground with some playground equipment, two basketball courts, and two volleyball courts in the school yard. The school also has access to the university's track and swimming pool.

== Song ==
附中附中 創校高雄
附中附中 五育並重
熱愛國家 民主是從 追求真理 服務大眾
建立信心 邁向成功
親愛精誠 和樂融融 我們同心協力 要做時代先鋒
親愛精誠 和樂融融 我們同心協力 要做時代先鋒

ASHS, ASHS, the school was established in Kaohsiung.
ASHS, ASHS, the Five Ways of Life are equally important.
Loving our country, always embracing democracy, seeking truth, serving the community.
Building confidence, forging ahead toward success.
Harmony, independence, balance, preeminence, camaraderie
Working together, becoming the leaders of our generation. (2x)

== See also ==
- Secondary education in Taiwan
