= Provincial Highway 31 (Taiwan) =

Provincial highway in Taiwan

Provincial Highway 31
- 台31線

Route information
- Maintained by Directorate General of Highways
- Length: 30.036 km (18.664 mi)

Major junctions
- North end: Prov 4 in Luzhu
- Nat 2 in Luzhu
- South end: Prov 66 in Xinwu

Location
- Country: Taiwan

Highway system
- Highway system in Taiwan
← Prov 30	→ Prov 37

Provincial Highway 31 (Chinese: 台31線) is a 30.036-kilometre-long (18.664-mile) provincial highway in Taoyuan City, Taiwan. An elevated section of the Taiwan High Speed Rail viaduct and under-tunnel acts as a median for most of the highway, except when the highway is near THSR Taoyuan Station and when the highway is near and on its southern terminus. The highway serves the THSR Taoyuan Station.

== Major intersections ==
County	Location	km	mi	Destinations	Notes
Luzhu	0.0	0.0	Prov 4 (Nankan Road) to Nat 1 – Zhuwei, Taoyuan District		
Luzhu	0.75	0.47	TR 15 (Fuguo Road) – Shuiwei, Zhuwei, Taoyuan District		
Luzhu	2.1	1.3	TR 19 (Fuhua Road) – Dahua, Luzhu Village		
Luzhu	4.8	3.0	Nat 2 – Taoyuan International Airport, Taoyuan District	Exit 5 (Dazhu Interchange) on Fwy. 2	
Luzhu	4.8	3.0	Cty 110 (Xinsheng Road) – Dayuan, Dazhu	Northbound exit and southbound entrance	
Dayuan	5.7	3.5	Cty 110A (Zhongzheng East Road) to Nat 1 – Zhongli, Dayuan		
Zhongli	8.8	5.5	Cty 113C north (Qingpu Road) – THSR Taoyuan Station	North end of CR 113C concurrency	
Zhongli	9.3	5.8	Cty 113C south (Xinsheng Road) – Zhongli	South end of CR 113C concurrency	
Zhongli	10.6	6.6	Cty 113 – Central Zhongli, Dayuan		
Zhongli	11.8	7.3	TR 43-1 (Shengde Road) – Zhongli, Dayuan		
Zhongli	12.9	8.0	Cty 112 (Zhongzheng Road) – Zhongli, Guanyin		
Zhongli–Xinwu border	16.5	10.3	Cty 114 (Minzu Road) to Nat 1		
Xinwu	17.9	11.1	Prov 66 to Nat 1 – Pingzhen, Daxi, Guanyin	At-grade intersection	
1.000 mi = 1.609 km; 1.000 km = 0.621 mi: Concurrency terminus; Incomplete access
