= Provincial Highway 4 (Taiwan) =

Provincial highway in Taiwan

Provincial Highway 4
- 台4線

Route information
- Maintained by Directorate General of Highways
- Length: 39.269 km (24.401 mi)

Major junctions
- West end: Prov 15 in Dayuan
- Prov 31 in Luzhu; Nat 1 in Luzhu; Prov 1 / Cty 110 in Taoyuan District; Prov 3 in Daxi
- East end: Prov 3B in Longtan

Location
- Country: Taiwan

Highway system
- Highway system in Taiwan
← Prov 3	→ Prov 5

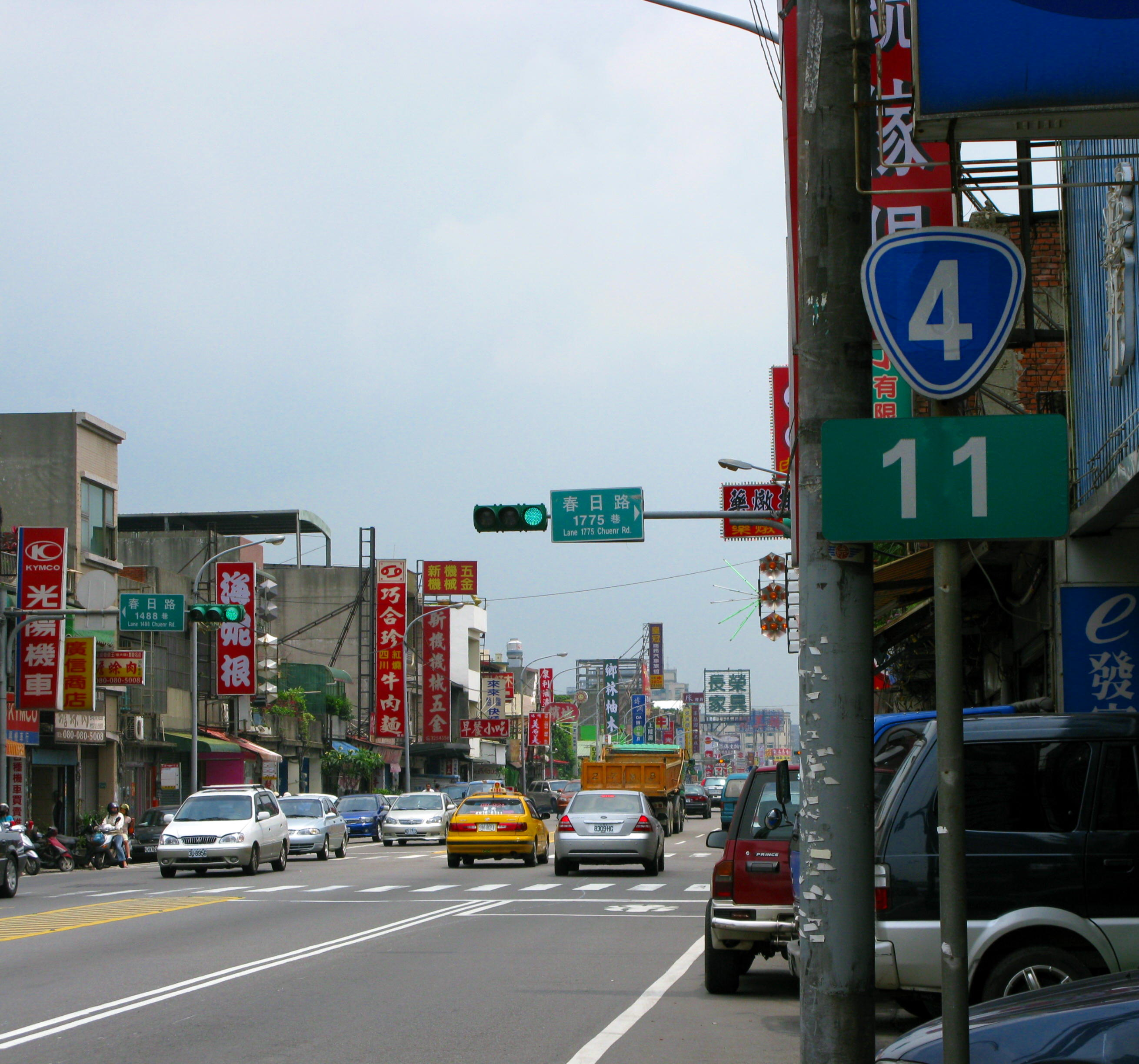
Provincial Highway 4 in Taoyuan District

Provincial Highway 4 (Chinese: 台4線) is a provincial highway that runs from Dayuan to Longtan in Taoyuan City.

== Route Description ==
Highway 4 begins at the junction of PH 15 in Dayuan, near Taiwan Taoyuan International Airport. The highway then continues through Luzhu, and is one of the main roads in Nankan (南崁) area, one of the fastest-growing suburbs in Taoyuan City. After the intersection with Freeway 1, the road enters Central Taoyuan as Chunri Road (春日路). The road then runs concurrently with PH 1 as Sanmin Road (三民路) in downtown Taoyuan until PH 1 splits and becomes Zhonghua Road (中華路). Highway 4 continues as Sanmin Road until it reaches Bade, where it becomes Jieshou Road (介壽路) and crosses Freeway 2. The road then enters the suburban district of Daxi, where it runs concurrent with PH 3 before splitting near old town Daxi. The highway continues and ends at the north rim of Shimen Dam in Longtan.

== Major intersections ==
County	Location	km	mi	Destinations	Notes
Dayuan	0.0	0.0	Prov 15 south (Section 3, Guoji Road) to Prov 61 – Guanyin	Access to PH 15 southbound / from PH 15 northbound only	
Dayuan	0.17	0.11	To Prov 15 north – Bali		
Dayuan	3.6	2.2	TR 5 north (Kengguo Road) – Haihu		
Luzhu	5.3	3.3	TR 19 south (Bagu Road) – Dapojiao		
Luzhu	5.7	3.5	TR 15 south (Section 3, Fuguo Road) – Luzhu		
Luzhu	6.7	4.2	Prov 31 south (Nanqing Road) to Nat 2 – THSR Taoyuan Station		
Luzhu	8.6	5.3	TR 3 north (Section 1, Nanshan Road) – Shanjiao	No access to TR 3 from PH 4 eastbound	
Luzhu	8.8	5.5	TR 6 west (Section 1, Nanzhu Road) – Dazhu		
Luzhu	10.0	6.2	Nat 1 – Taipei, Zhongli	Exit 49 (Taoyuan Interchange) on Fwy. 1	
Taoyuan District	11.5	7.1	TR 18 west (Zhuangjing Road)		
Taoyuan District	14.5	9.0	Prov 1 north (Section 2, Sanmin Road) – Guishan, Xinzhuang; Cty 110 east (Chunri Road) – Central Taoyuan, Yingge	West end of PH 1 / CR 110 concurrency	
Taoyuan District	15.5	9.6	Cty 110 west (Yong'an Road) – Dayuan	East end of CR 110 concurrency	
Taoyuan District	16.0	9.9	Prov 1 south (Zhongshan Road)	East end of PH 1 concurrency	
Taoyuan District	16.4	10.2	Prov 1A (Fuxing Road)		
Taoyuan District	17.5	10.9	TR 55 south (Jiexin Street)		
Bade	20.0	12.4	TR 48 west (Guangfu Road) – Zhongli		
Bade	20.1	12.5	TR 46 (Jianguo Road / Heping Road) to Nat 2 – Yingge, Xiaoli		
Bade	23.0	14.3	Cty 114 (Xingfeng Road) – Yingge, Zhongli		
Daxi	25.1	15.6	TR 56 south (Lane 555, Jieshou Road)		
Daxi	27.0	16.8	Prov 3 south (Section 1, Yuanlin Road) to Nat 3 / Prov 66 – Longtan	West end of PH 3 concurrency	
Daxi	28.2	17.5	Prov 3 north – Central Daxi, Sanxia; TR 60 north (Daying Road) to Nat 3 – Yingge; TR 64 west (Sanyuan 1st Road)	East end of PH 3 concurrency	
Daxi	32.8	20.4	TR 59-1 south – Cihu		
Longtan	39.269	24.401	Prov 3B – Shenwo, Yuanshulin		
1.000 mi = 1.609 km; 1.000 km = 0.621 mi: Concurrency terminus; Incomplete access
