= National Freeway 1 =

Freeway in Taiwan

National freeway 1
- Sun Yat-sen Freeway (中山高速公路)

Route information
- Maintained by Taiwan Area National Freeway Bureau
- Length: 374.3 km (232.6 mi)
- Existed: 31 October 1978–present

Major junctions
- North end: Prov 2 in Ren'ai
- Nat 3 in Xizhi; Nat 2 in Taoyuan District; Nat 3 in Baoshan; Nat 4 in Shengang; Nat 3 in Changhua; Nat 8 in Sinshih; Nat 10 in Renwu
- South end: Prov 17 in Cianjhen

Location
- Country: Taiwan
- Major cities: Keelung, Taipei, New Taipei, Taoyuan, Zhubei, Hsinchu, Taichung, Changhua, Chiayi, Tainan, Kaohsiung

Highway system
- Highway system in Taiwan
| ← Nat 10 | → Nat 2 |

National Freeway 1
- Traditional Chinese: 國道1號
- Simplified Chinese: 国道1号
Transcriptions
Standard Mandarin
- Hanyu Pinyin: Guódào Yīháo

Sun Yat-sen Freeway
- Chinese: 中山高速公路
Transcriptions
Standard Mandarin
- Hanyu Pinyin: Zhōngshān Gāosù Gōnglù
- Wade–Giles: Chungshan K'aosu Kunglu
Yue: Cantonese
- Yale Romanization: Jung1 shan1 Gau1 su4 gung1 lu4
- Jyutping: Zung1 saan1 Gou1 cuk1 gung1 lou6
Southern Min
- Hokkien POJ: Tiong-san Ko-sok Kang-lō

National Freeway 1 (Chinese: 國道1號; pinyin: Guódào Yīhào), also known as Sun Yat-sen Freeway (Chinese: 中山高速公路; pinyin: Zhōngshān gāosù gōnglù), is a toll road and the first controlled-access highway built in Taiwan. It begins in Keelung at the intersection of Xiao 2nd Road and Zhong 4th Road and ends in Kaohsiung at the intersection of Zhongshan 4th Road and Yugang Road, giving it a total length of 374.3 km (232.6 mi).

== Naming ==
The Republic of China government named the controlled highway Sun Yat-sen Freeway in honor of Sun Yat-sen, the country's founding father.

National Freeway 1 is a tollway where the amount charged varies by distance traveled, with vehicles being fitted with an electronic tag to facilitate toll calculation; the term "freeway" refers to "free of signal", and not free from charge. There are eleven toll stations on the turnpike.

== History ==
The construction began in 1971. The north section between Keelung and Zhongli was completed in 1974, and the entire highway was opened in 1978. Saudi Arabia supported the construction of the highway by providing an interest free loan.

A 20.7 km (12.9 mi) viaduct on top of the freeway between Xizhi and Wugu was completed in 1997 in order to expand the capacity of the road. An extension of the viaduct south to Yangmei was opened in 2013, at a cost of nearly 3 billion US dollars.

The 2019 Han Kuang Exercise featured takeoff and landing practice by Republic of China Air Force aircraft on the Huatan section of National freeway 1 in Changhua County.

== Lanes ==
The lanes in both directions are listed below.

- 4 Lanes:
  - Keelung terminus – Exit 23 (Yuanshan)
  - Xizhi-Wugu Elevated Highway: Xizhi terminus – Exit 26 (Huanbei)
- 6 Lanes:
  - Exit 23 (Yuanshan) – Exit 25 (Taipei)
  - Exit 52 (Airport System) – Exit 192 (Changhua System)
  - Exit 198 (Changhua) – Exit 356 (Nanzih) (special measures adopted in partial sections)
  - Exit 367 (Kaohsiung) – Kaohsiung terminus
  - Xizhi-Wugu Elevated Highway: Exit 26 (Huanbei) – Wugu terminus
- 8 Lanes:
  - Exit 25 (Taipei) – Exit 52 (Airport System)
  - Exit 192 (Changhua System) – Exit 198 (Changhua)
  - Exit 356 (Nanzih) – Exit 362 (Dingjin System)
- 10 Lanes:
  - Exit 362 (Dingjin System) – Exit 367 (Kaohsiung)

== Exit list ==
| County | Location | km | mi | Exit | Name | Destinations | Notes |
|---|---|---|---|---|---|---|---|
| Keelung City | Ren'ai | 0.0 | 0.0 | 0 | Keelung Terminus | Prov 2 (Chenggong Second Road) | via Keelung Port West Viaduct |
| Keelung City | Qidu | 1.1 | 0.68 | 1 | Keelung | To Prov 5 – Badu, Jinshan | |
| Keelung City | Qidu | 2.6 | 1.6 | 2 | Badu | Prov 2D / Prov 62 – Ruifang, Nuannuan | Northbound exit and southbound entrance |
| Keelung City | Qidu | 5.0 | 3.1 | 5 | Dahua System | Prov 62 – Wanli, Ruibin | Northbound exit and southbound entrance |
| Keelung City | Qidu | 6.8 | 4.2 | 6 | Wudu | Wudu | |
| New Taipei City | Xizhi | 10.5 | 6.5 | 10 | Xizhi | Prov 5B to Prov 5A – Xizhi | |
| New Taipei City | Xizhi | 11.5 | 7.1 | 11 | Xizhi System | Nat 3 to Nat 5 – Wanli, Muzha | Signed as exit 10 southbound |
| New Taipei City | Xizhi | 12.8 | 8.0 | 12 | Xizhi Terminus | Xizhi–Wugu Elevated Road – Wugu, Tiding | Northern terminus of viaduct (collector-express system); southbound entrance to viaduct |
| Taipei City | Neihu | 15.2 | 9.4 | 15 | Donghu | Kangning Road | Northbound exit and southbound entrance |
| Taipei City | Neihu | 16.6 | 10.3 | 16A | Neihu | Nanjing East Road | Southbound exit and northbound entrance |
| Taipei City | Neihu | 16.8 | 10.4 | 16B | Neihu | Chenggong Road | Signed as exit 16 northbound |
| Taipei City | Zhongshan | 22.9 | 14.2 | 23A | Yuanshan | Binjiang Street | Northbound exit and southbound entrance |
| Taipei City | Zhongshan | 23.2 | 14.4 | 23B | Yuanshan | Jianguo North Road / Songjiang Road | Signed as exit 23 southbound |
| Taipei City | Datong | 25.1 | 15.6 | 25 | Taipei | Prov 2B (Chongqing North Road) – Downtown Taipei, Shilin | Signed as exits 25A (north) and 25B (south) southbound |
| Tamsui River | | 25.9– 26.3 | 16.1– 16.3 | Tamsui River Bridge | | | |
| New Taipei City | Sanchong | 27.1 | 16.8 | 27 | Sanchong | Cty 103 (Sanhe Road) / Cty 104 south (Chongyang Road) – Sanchong | |
| New Taipei City | Wugu | 32.9 | 20.4 | 32 | Wugu Transfer | Xizhi–Wugu Elevated Road – Xizhi, Tiding | Northbound transfer onto viaduct |
| New Taipei City | Wugu | 33.1 | 20.6 | 33 | Wugu | Prov 64 / Prov 65 south / Cty 107A (Xinwu Road) – Xinzhuang, Wugu | |
| New Taipei City | Taishan | 35.8 | 22.2 | 35 | Taishan Transfer | Wugu–Yangmei Elevated Road – Taoyuan Airport, Hukou | Southbound transfer onto viaduct |
| New Taipei City–Taoyuan City border | Linkou–Guishan-Luzhu border | 40.9 | 25.4 | 41A | Linkou | Cty 105 (Wenhua First Road) – Linkou, Guishan | |
| New Taipei City–Taoyuan City border | Linkou–Guishan-Luzhu border | 42.3 | 26.3 | 41B | Linkou | Wenhua N Rd. (Linkou), Zhongyi Rd. (Guishan), Bade 1st Rd. (Luzhu) | |
| Taoyuan City | Luzhu | 49.1 | 30.5 | 49 | Taoyuan | Prov 4 – Taoyuan District, Nankan | |
| Taoyuan City | Taoyuan District | 52.7 | 32.7 | 52 | Airport System | Nat 2 to Nat 3 – Taoyuan District, Dayuan, Taoyuan Airport | |
| Taoyuan City | Zhongli | 55.2 | 34.3 | Zhongli Service Area | | | |
| Taoyuan City | Zhongli | 57.0 | 35.4 | 57 | Neili | Cty 110A (Zhongyuan Road) – Dayuan, Zhongli | Signed as exits 57A (north) and 57B (south) northbound |
| Taoyuan City | Zhongli | | | 59 | Zhongli Transfer | Wugu–Yangmei Elevated Road north – Taoyuan Airport, Wugu south – Hukou | Northbound and southbound transfer onto viaduct |
| Taoyuan City | Zhongli–Pingzhen district line | 62.4 | 38.8 | 62 | Zhongli | Cty 114 (Minzu Road) – Zhongli, Pingzhen, Xinwu | |
| Taoyuan City | Pingzhen | 65.0 | 40.4 | 65 | Pingzhen System | Prov 66 – Daxi, Guanyin | |
| Taoyuan City | Yangmei | 67.3 | 41.8 | 67 | Youshi | Youth Industrial Park | |
| Taoyuan City | Yangmei | 69.2 | 43.0 | 69 | Yangmei | Prov 1 (Zhongshan North Road) – Puxin, Yangmei | |
| Taoyuan City | Yangmei | | | 71.0 | Yangmei Terminus | Wugu–Yangmei Elevated Road – Taoyuan Airport, Wugu | Southern terminus of viaduct (collector-express system), northbound entrance to viaduct |
| Hsinchu | Hukou | 83.8 | 52.1 | 83 | Hukou | Hukou, Xinfeng, Hsinchu Industrial Park | |
| Hsinchu | Hukou | 85.9– 87.1 | 53.4– 54.1 | Hukou Service Area | | | |
| Hsinchu | Zhubei | 91.0 | 56.5 | 91 | Zhubei | Guangming Sixth Road to CR 120 – Qionglin, Zhubei | |
| Hsinchu City | East District | 94.2 | 58.5 | 95A | Hsinchu | Gongdao Fifth Road | |
| Hsinchu City | East District | 95.0 | 59.0 | 95A | Hsinchu | Cty 117 / Cty 122 (Guangfu Road) – Zhudong, Hsinchu | |
| Hsinchu City | East District | 96.1 | 59.7 | 95B | Hsinchu | Xinan Road – Hsinchu Science Park | |
| Hsinchu City–Hsinchu County border | East District–Baoshan border | 96.7 | 60.1 | 95B | Hsinchu | Yuanqu Second Road | |
| Hsinchu | Baoshan | 99.4 | 61.8 | 99 | Hsinchu System | Nat 3 – Zhunan, Taichung, Zhudong, Taipei | Signed as exits 99A (south) and 99B (north) |
| Hsinchu City | No major junctions | | | | | | |
| Miaoli | Toufen | 110.4 | 68.6 | 110 | Toufen | Prov 1 / Cty 124A east to Cty 124 – Sanwan, Toufen | |
| Miaoli | Touwu | 126.0 | 78.3 | 126 | Touwu | Prov 13 – Zaoqiao, Touwu | |
| Miaoli | Gongguan | 132.8 | 82.5 | 132 | Miaoli | Prov 6 – Gongguan, Miaoli | |
| Miaoli | Tongluo | 140.1 | 87.1 | 140 | Tongluo | Prov 13 – Miaoli, Sanyi | |
| Miaoli | Sanyi | 150.2 | 93.3 | 150 | Sanyi | Prov 13 – Sanyi | |
| Taichung City | Houli | 158.4– 159.2 | 98.4– 98.9 | Tai'an Service Area | | | |
| Taichung City | Houli | 160.6 | 99.8 | 160 | Houli | Cty 132 (Jiahou Road) – Houli, Waipu | |
| Taichung City | Shengang | 165.5 | 102.8 | 165 | Taichung System | Nat 4 to Nat 3 – Fengyuan, Qingshui | |
| Taichung City | Shengang | 168.1 | 104.5 | 168 | Fengyuan | Prov 10 – Fengyuan, Shengang | |
| Taichung City | Xitun | 174.2 | 108.2 | 174 | Daya | To Prov 1B (Zhongqing Road) – Taichung, Daya | |
| Taichung City | Xitun | 178.6 | 111.0 | 178 | Taichung | Prov 12 (Taiwan Boulevard) – Taichung, Shalu | |
| Taichung City | Nantun | 181.4 | 112.7 | 181 | Nantun | Cty 136 (Wuquan West Road) – Taichung, Longjing | |
| Taichung City | Dadu | 189.4 | 117.7 | 189 | Wangtian | Prov 1 – Wuri, Dadu | |
| Changhua | Changhua | 192.8 | 119.8 | 192 | Changhua System | Nat 3 – Nantou, Dajia | |
| Changhua | Changhua | 198.4 | 123.3 | 198 | Changhua | Prov 19 – Changhua, Lukang | |
| Changhua | Dacun–Puyan township line | 207.7 | 129.1 | 207 | Puyan System | Prov 76 – Yuanlin, Caotun, Fuxing, Puyan | |
| Changhua | Xihu | 211.0 | 131.1 | 211 | Yuanlin | Cty 148 – Puxin, Yuanlin, Xihu | |
| Changhua | Pitou | 220.1 | 136.8 | 220 | Beidou | Cty 150 – Beidou, Pitou | |
| Yunlin | Xiluo | 229.6– 230.6 | 142.7– 143.3 | Xiluo Service Area | | | |
| Yunlin | Xiluo | 230.5 | 143.2 | 230 | Xiluo | Prov 1 – Cihtong, Xiluo | |
| Yunlin | Huwei | 235.7 | 146.5 | 236 | Huwei | Cty 145B – Douliu, Huwei | |
| Yunlin | Dounan | 240.6 | 149.5 | 240 | Dounan | Cty 158 (Daye Road) – Dounan, Huwei | |
| Yunlin | Dapi | 243.8 | 151.5 | 243 | Yunlin System | Prov 78 – Gukeng, Tuku | |
| Chiayi | Dalin | 250.3 | 155.5 | 250 | Dalin | Cty 162 – Dalin, Xikou | |
| Chiayi | Minxiong | 257.2 | 159.8 | 257 | Minxiong | Minxin Road to CR 164 – Minxiong, Xingang | |
| Chiayi City | West District | 264.3 | 164.2 | 264 | Chiayi | Cty 159 – Chiayi, Xingang, Beigang | |
| Chiayi | Shuishang | 271.0 | 168.4 | 270 | Shuishang | Cty 168 – Shuishang, Puzi | |
| Chiayi | Shuishang | 272.9 | 169.6 | 272 | Chiayi System | Prov 82 to Nat 3 – Shuishang, Lucao | |
| Tainan City | Houbi | 284.4– 285.1 | 176.7– 177.2 | Xinying Service Area | | | |
| Tainan City | Xinying | 288.4 | 179.2 | 288 | Xinying | Cty 172 – Xinying, Yanshuei | |
| Tainan City | Xiaying | 300.2 | 186.5 | 299 | Xiaying System | Prov 84 east – Yujing | |
| Tainan City | Madou | 303.7 | 188.7 | 303 | Madou | Cty 176 – Madou, Jiali | |
| Tainan City | Anding | 311.1 | 193.3 | 311 | Anding | To Cty 178 – Shanhua, Anding | |
| Tainan City | Sinshih | 315.5 | 196.0 | 315 | Tainan System | Nat 8 to Nat 3 – Xinhua, Tainan | |
| Tainan City | Yongkang | 319.6 | 198.6 | 319 | Yongkang | Prov 1 (Zhongzheng North Road) – Yongkang, Tainan | |
| Tainan City | Yongkang | 324.4 | 201.6 | 324 | Dawan | Cty 180 (Xiaodong Road, Fuxing Road, Dawan Road) – Yongkang, Tainan | Southbound exit and northbound entrance |
| Tainan City | Rende | 327.4 | 203.4 | 327 | Tainan | Cty 182 (Zhongshan Road) – Rende, Tainan | |
| Tainan City | Rende | 330.7 | 205.5 | 330 | Rende System | Prov 86 – Guanmiao, Tainan | |
| Tainan City | Rende | 335.6– 336.5 | 208.5– 209.1 | Rende Service Area | | | |
| Kaohsiung City | Lujhu | 338.3 | 210.2 | 338 | Luzhu | Prov 28 – Alian, Lujhu | |
| Kaohsiung City | Lujhu | 342.0 | 212.5 | 342 | Kaohsiung Science | Kaohsiung Science Park | |
| Kaohsiung City | Yanchao | 349.4 | 217.1 | 349 | Gangshan | Cty 186 – Yanchao, Gangshan | |
| Kaohsiung City | Nanzih | 356.2 | 221.3 | 356 | Nanzih | Prov 22 (Qinan Road) – Dashe, Nanzih | |
| Kaohsiung City | Nanzih | 356.9 | 221.8 | 356 | Nanzih | Xingnan Road | |
| Kaohsiung City | Nanzih–Renwu district line | 358.0 | 222.5 | 356 | Nanzih | Cty 183 – Nanzih, Renwu | |
| Kaohsiung City | Renwu | 362.4 | 225.2 | 362 | Dingjin System | Nat 10 to Nat 3 – Cishan, Zuoying | |
| Kaohsiung City | Sanmin | 367.5 | 228.4 | 367A | Kaohsiung | Prov 1 (Jiouru First Road) | Southbound exit and northbound entrance |
| Kaohsiung City | Lingya | 368.3 | 228.9 | 367A | Kaohsiung | Prov 1E (Jianguo First Road) | Southbound exit and northbound entrance |
| Kaohsiung City | Lingya | 368.7 | 229.1 | 367B | Kaohsiung | Zhongzheng First Road | |
| Kaohsiung City | Lingya | 369.0 | 229.3 | 367C | Kaohsiung | Sanduo First Road | Northbound exit only |
| Kaohsiung City | Fengshan | 369.6 | 229.7 | 369 | Ruilong Road | Ruilong Road | Southbound exit only |
| Kaohsiung City | Fengshan | 370.4 | 230.2 | 370 | Wujia System | Prov 88 east – Pingtung City | Southbound exit and northbound entrance |
| Kaohsiung City | Fengshan | 371.8 | 231.0 | 372 | Wujia | Sanshang Street to CR 183 (Wujia Second Road) – Fengshan | Northbound exit and southbound entrance |
| Kaohsiung City | Cianjhen | 372.8 | 231.6 | 373 | Kaohsiung Terminus | Prov 17 (Zhongshan 4th Road), Caoya 1st & 2nd Road, Xinsheng Road Viaduct | |
1.000 mi = 1.609 km; 1.000 km = 0.621 mi: Incomplete access

=== Xizhi–Wugu Elevated Road ===
| County | Location | km | mi | Exit | Name | Destinations | Notes |
|---|---|---|---|---|---|---|---|
| New Taipei City | Xizhi | 12.8 | 8.0 | — | | Nat 1 north | |
| Taipei City | Neihu | 18.8 | 11.7 | 18 | Tiding | Tiding Boulevard | |
| Taipei City | Songshan | 20.7 | 12.9 | 20 | Xiatayou | Binjiang Street | Northbound exit only |
| Taipei City | Datong | 26.1 | 16.2 | 26 | Huanbei | Huanhe North Road | Northbound exit and southbound entrance |
| New Taipei City | Wugu | 32.0 | 19.9 | 32 | Wugu Transfer | Wugu–Yangmei Elevated Road – Taoyuan Airport, Yangmei | Southbound exit and northbound entrance |
| New Taipei City | Wugu | 32.1 | 19.9 | 33 | Wugu | Prov 64 / Prov 65 south / Cty 107A (Xinwu Road) – Xinzhuang, Wugu | Southbound exit and northbound entrance |
| New Taipei City | Wugu | 32.9 | 20.4 | — | | Nat 1 south | |
1.000 mi = 1.609 km; 1.000 km = 0.621 mi: Incomplete access

=== Wugu–Yangmei Elevated Road ===
| County | Location | km | mi | Exit | Name | Destinations | Notes |
|---|---|---|---|---|---|---|---|
| New Taipei City | Wugu | 32.0 | 19.9 | — | | Xizhi–Wugu Elevated Road – Xizhi, Tiding | |
| New Taipei City | Taishan | 35.8 | 22.2 | 35 | Taishan Transfer | Nat 1 north | Northbound transfer to ground |
| Taoyuan | Taoyuan District | 52.7 | 32.7 | 52 | Airport System | Nat 2 west – Dayuan, Taoyuan Airport | No exit to eastbound |
| Taoyuan | Zhongli | 59.7 | 37.1 | 59 | Zhongli Transfer | Nat 1 north – Taoyuan; Nat 1 south – Zhongli | Northbound and southbound transfer to ground |
| Taoyuan | Yangmei | 71 | 44 | — | | Nat 1 south | |
1.000 mi = 1.609 km; 1.000 km = 0.621 mi: Incomplete access

== Gallery ==
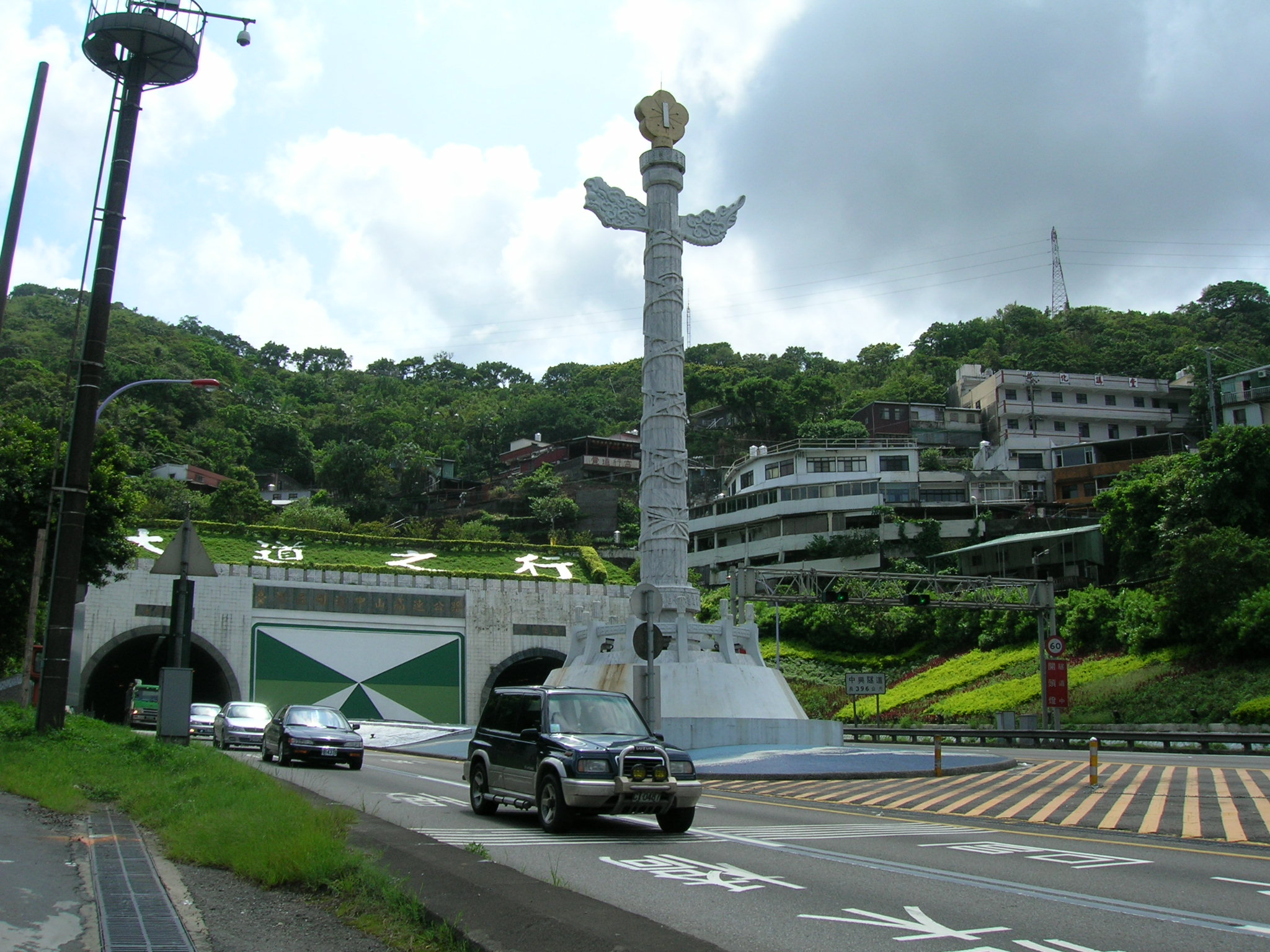
Huabiao at the start in Keelung

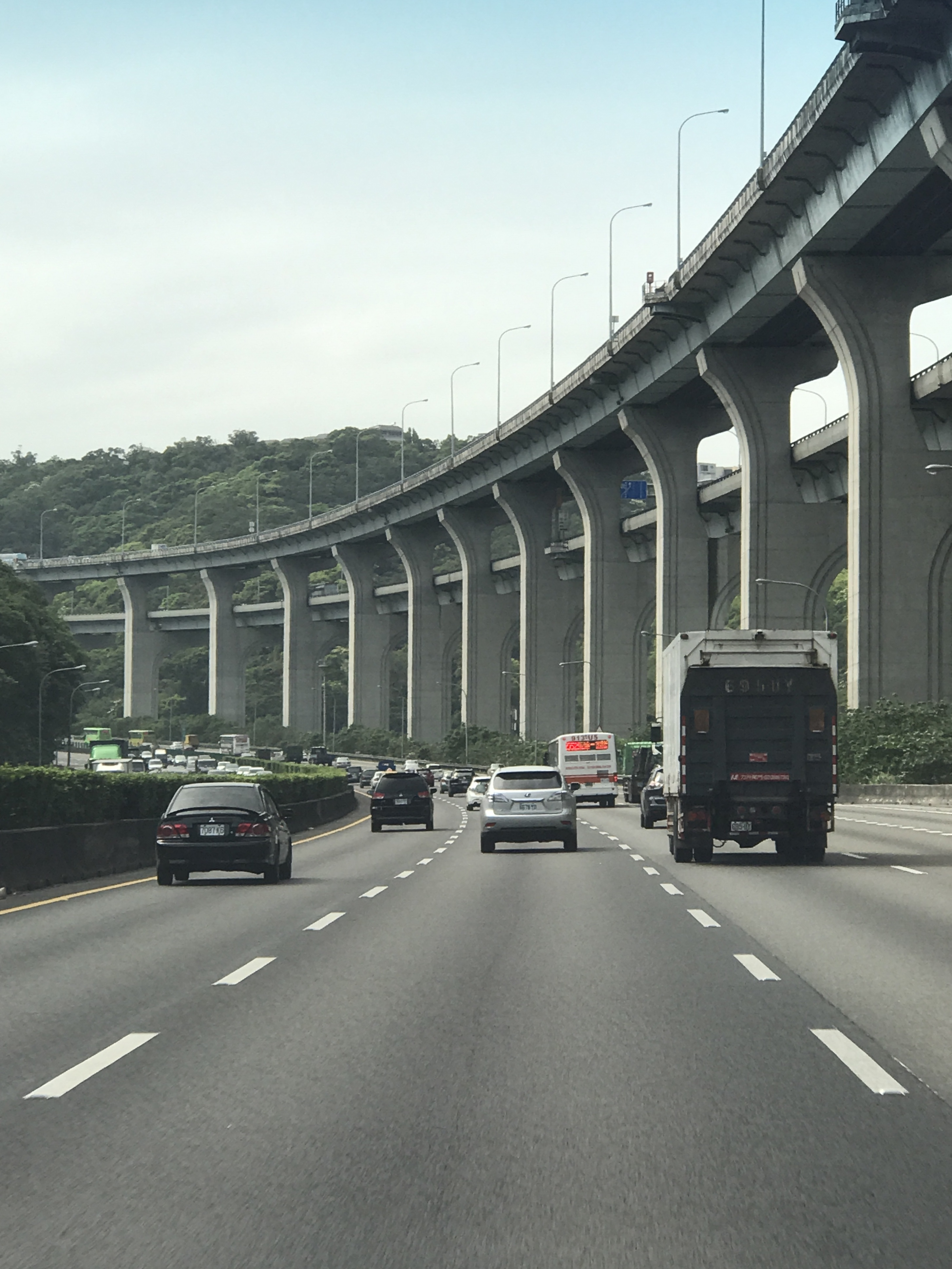
Freeway 1 with the Wugu-Yangmei Viaduct in Taishan District, New Taipei

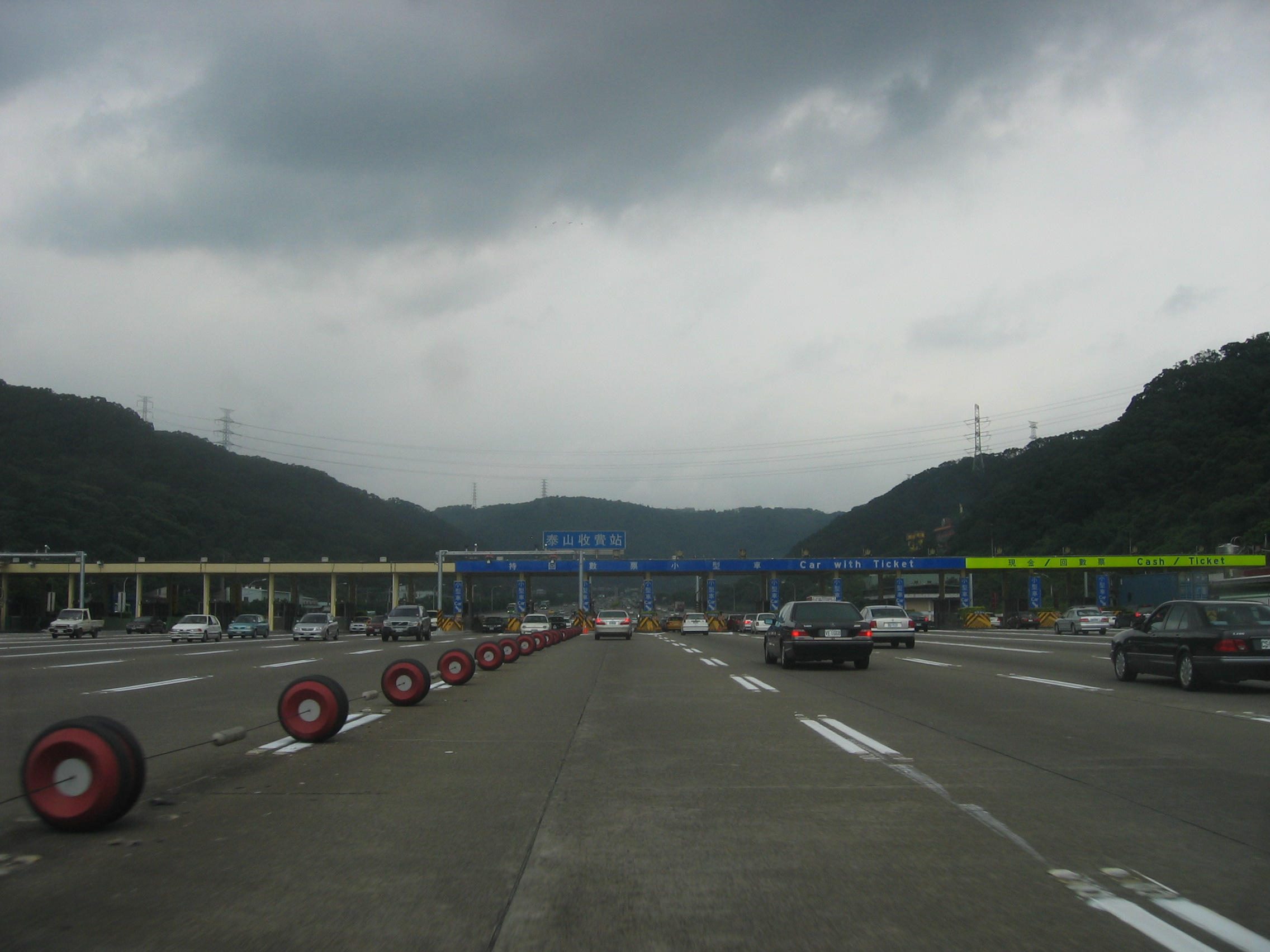
Former Taishan Tollbooth (dismantled after being replaced by electronic toll collection

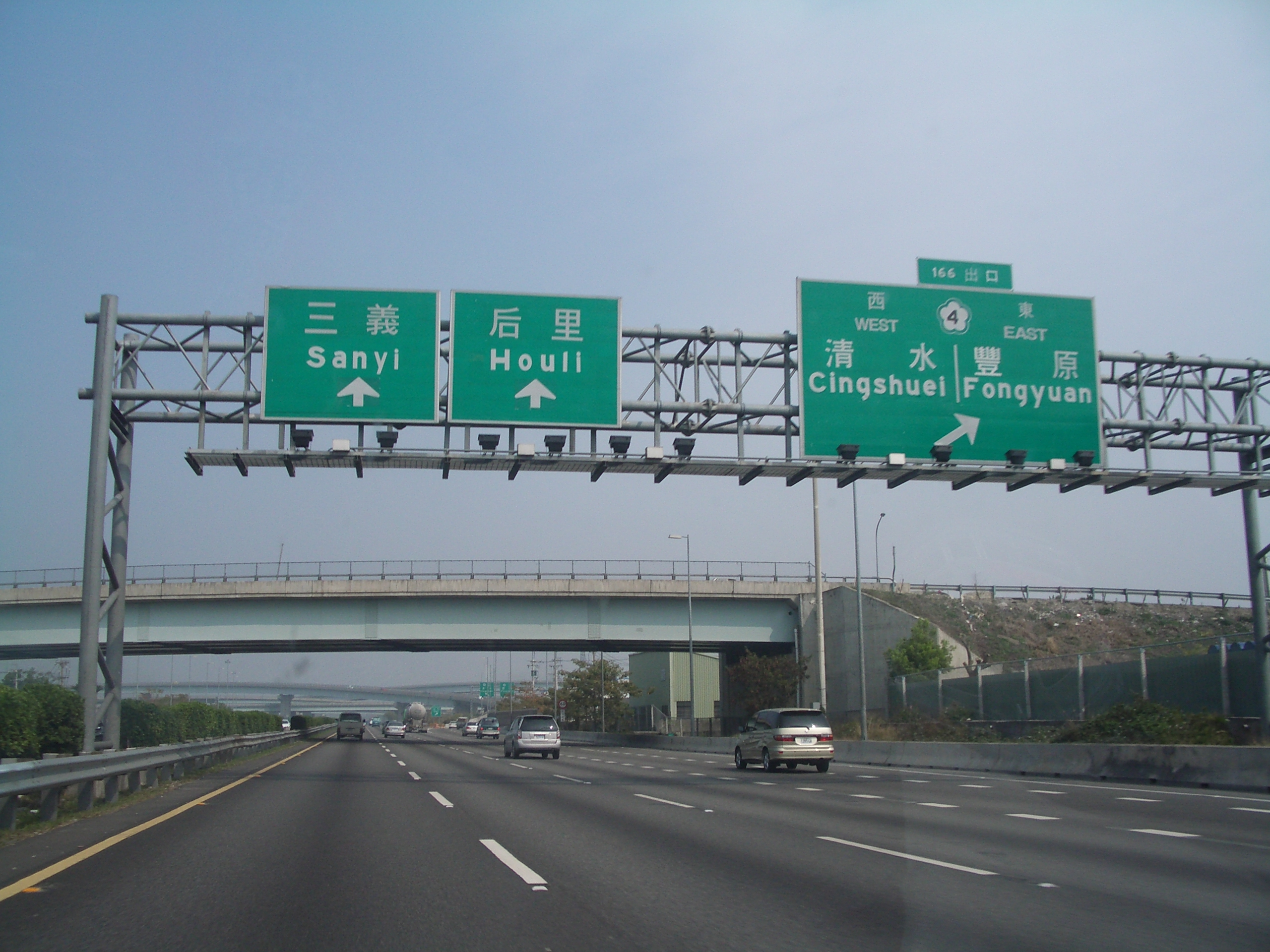
Taichung section

== See also ==
- Highway system in Taiwan
- Ten Major Construction Projects
