= Provincial Highway 62 (Taiwan) =

Road in Taiwan

Provincial Highway 62
- 台62線

Route information
- Maintained by Directorate General of Highways
- Length: 19.046 km (11.835 mi)
- Existed: 10 November 2004–present

Major junctions
- West end: Prov 2 in Anle
- Nat 3 in Qidu; Nat 1 in Qidu; Prov 2D in Nuannuan; Prov 62A in Ruifang; Prov 2D in Xinyi
- East end: Prov 2 in Ruifang

Location
- Country: Taiwan

Highway system
- Highway system in Taiwan
← Prov 61	→ Prov 63

Provincial Highway 62 (Chinese: 台62線) is an expressway that begins in Anle District, Keelung City, and ends in Ruifang District, New Taipei City. Its length is 19.046 km, or 11.835 miles.

The expressway opened on June 29, 2007, and has a speed limit of 80 km/h (50 mph).

== Major Cities Along the Route ==
- Keelung City
- New Taipei City

== Exit list ==
City	Location	km	Mile	Exit	Name	Destinations	Notes
Keelung	Anle	0.000	0.000	—		Prov 2 – Wanli, Keelung	
Keelung	Qidu	2.035	1.264	2	Madong System	Nat 3 – Xizhi, Keelung	Westbound exit and eastbound entrance
Keelung	Qidu	3.161	1.964	3	Qidu	TR 1 – Dapu, Zhonggu	
Keelung	Qidu	5.635	3.501	5	Qidu	Qidu	Westbound exit and eastbound entrance
Keelung	Qidu	5.635	3.501	6	Dahua System	Nat 1 south – Wudu	
Keelung	Nuannuan	9.405	5.844	9	Nuannuan	Prov 2D – Nuannuan	
New Taipei	Ruifang	13.990	8.693	13	Sijiaoting	Prov 62A north	Eastbound exit and westbound entrance
Keelung	Xinyi	16.000	9.942	16A	Ruifang	Prov 2D – Ruifang, Badu	Eastbound exit and westbound entrance
Keelung	Xinyi	16.000	9.942	16B	Ruifang 1	Cty 102 to Prov 2 – Badouzih	Eastbound exit and westbound entrance
New Taipei	Ruifang	19.046	11.835	18	Ruibin End	Prov 2 – Ruibin, Keelung, Gongliao	
1.000 mi = 1.609 km; 1.000 km = 0.621 mi: Incomplete access

== Branch Line ==
The branch line (Provincial Highway No. 62A) (Chinese: 台62甲線) starts at Keelung Harbor and ends at Sijiaoting. Its length is 5.744 km.

City	Location	km	Mile	Exit	Name	Destinations	Notes
Keelung	Zhongzheng	0.000	0.000	—		Prov 2 – Downtown Keelung, East Port of Keelung	
Keelung	Xinyi	3.2	2.0	3	Xiaodong	Cty 102 – Ruifang, Keelung	
New Taipei City	Ruifang	5.744	3.569	5	Sijiaoting	Prov 62 – Nuannuan; City Route 37 to Prov 2D – Ruifang, Sijiaoting	
1.000 mi = 1.609 km; 1.000 km = 0.621 mi: Incomplete access

== See also ==
- Highway system in Taiwan
