= Provincial Highway 64 (Taiwan) =

Road in Taiwan

Provincial Highway 64
- 台64線
- 東西向快速公路八里新店線 (East-West Expressway, Bali-Xindian Line)

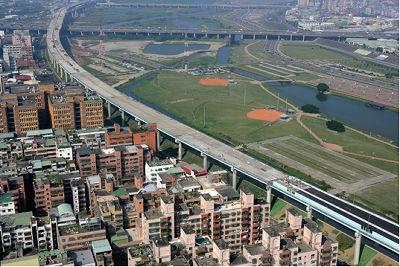

Route information
- Maintained by Directorate General of Highways
- Length: 28.42 km (17.66 mi)
- Existed: 31 January 2000–present

Major junctions
- West end: Prov 61 in Bali
- Prov 15 / Cty 105 in Bali; Nat 1 / Cty 108 in Wugu; Prov 1 in Sanchong; Prov 3 / Cty 106A in Banqiao; Nat 3 in Zhonghe
- East end: Cty 106 in Zhonghe

Location
- Country: Taiwan

Highway system
- Highway system in Taiwan
← Prov 63	→ Prov 65

Provincial Highway 64 (台64線, PH 64) is a 28.42-kilometre-long (17.66-mile) expressway in Taiwan entirely within the limits of New Taipei City. Also known as East-West Expressway, Bali-Xindian Line (Chinese: 東西向快速公路八里新店線; Hanyu Pinyin: Dōngxīxiàng Kuàisùgōnglù Bālǐ Xīndiàn Xiàn; Tongyong Pinyin: Dongsisiàng Kuàisùgonglù Balǐ Sindiàn Siàn), the route begins in Port of Taipei in Bali District and ends near the western end of Xiulang Bridge in Zhonghe District, linking many major population centers within New Taipei together, including Sanchong, Banqiao, and Zhonghe. It is one of twelve east-west expressways of western Taiwan linking Freeways 1 and 3.

== Route description ==
As an elevated expressway, PH 64 traverses through rural, suburban, and urban areas of New Taipei City. Beginning near the Port of Taipei in Bali District, the route proceeds southeast, crossing over PH 15 and CR 105. Then the route turns east and tunnels through Guanyin Mountain through the Guanyinshan Tunnel. The route emerges from the tunnel near Chengzilao of Wugu District, turning south along the west shore of the Erchong Flood Diversion Path (二重疏洪道). PH 64 then intersects with CR 108, with an indirect connection to Freeway 1 available via a viaduct over CR 108 and CR 107A at this interchange. Then the expressway crosses over Freeway 1 and leaves Wugu.

As the route enters Sanchong, it leaves the rural areas of the city and takes on a more suburban character. PH 64 continues southeast along the Erchong Flood Diversion Path, and then crosses over the Dahan River while running parallel with the New Taipei Expressway on Chongcui Bridge as it exits Sanchong and enters Banqiao. The route proceeds southwest, straddling the southern shore of the Dahan River before turning southeast near CR 106A and Dahan Bridge into central Banqiao. Here the expressway enters the urban areas of New Taipei, with tall buildings closely lining the sides of the expressway, and proceeds like this until the eastern terminus.

The expressway continues above CR 106A, which is Minsheng Road in Banqiao, and becomes Zhongzheng Road in Zhonghe. At the interchange with Freeway 3 in Zhonghe, the route bends from south to east. It then continues above Zhongzheng Road (CR 106A) and then Jingping Road (CR 106) in Zhonghe before terminating near the western end of Xiulang Bridge. The route does not actually reach Xindian; to get there, one needs to use the Xiulang Bridge, which is on CR 106 and not PH 64.

== History ==
The road was originally planned as a mostly at-grade boulevard by the Taipei County Government known as Special Route 1 (特一號道路) from Xiulang Bridge in Zhonghe to Wugu Industrial Park (now New Taipei Industrial Park) through Banqiao and Xinzhuang. Originally the only elevated section of the route was from Dahan Bridge to Minsheng Overpass in Banqiao. In the 1990s, as part of the expressway plans in Taiwan, the Special Route 1 corridor was selected to be upgraded to an expressway-grade Provincial Highway as PH 64. However, due to highway revolts from residents of Xinzhuang and central Wugu, the western portion of PH 64 was realigned to the present route, which bypassed the controversial areas by using the right-of-way near the levees and terminated at Taipei Port in Bali instead of Wugu Industrial Park.

The road opened in stages, and was completed by late 2009. The section from Banqiao to Zhonghe opened in 2000, while the section from Banqiao to Bali opened in 2009. Bicyclists and pedestrians had exclusive use of the expressway, and some celebratory events took place to celebrate the completion of PH 64.

== Exit list ==
The entire route is in New Taipei City.

Location	km	mi	Exit	Name	Destinations	Notes
Bali	0.000	0.000	—		Prov 61 south – Linkou	
Bali	0.855	0.531	1	Bali	Prov 15 / Cty 105 – Bali	Westbound exit and eastbound entrance
Mount Guanyin	2.6– 5.2	1.6– 3.2	Guanyinshan Tunnel			
Wugu	6.474	4.023	6	Guanyinshan	TR 53-1 – Guanyinshan	
Wugu	10.200	6.338	10	Wugu 1	Chengzilao	
Wugu	11.823	7.346	11	Wugu 2	Nat 1 / Cty 108 – Luzhou, Wugu	
Sanchong	15.028	9.338	14 16	Sanchong	Prov 1 – Sanchong, Xinzhuang	Signed as exit 14 eastbound and exit 16 westbound
Banqiao	17.823	11.075	17	Jiangzicui	New Taipei Expressway	Eastbound exit and westbound entrance
Banqiao	17.823	11.075	18	Jiangzicui	Huanhe Road – Jiangzicui	Westbound exit and eastbound entrance
Banqiao	20.880	12.974	20	Banqiao	Prov 3 (Wenhua Road) / Cty 106A – Banqiao	
Zhonghe	23.020	14.304	23	Zhonghe 1	Zhongzheng Road to CR 106 (Zhongshan Road) – Zhonghe	Eastbound exit and westbound entrance
Zhonghe	23.886	14.842	24	Zhonghe	Nat 3 – Taipei, Tucheng	Eastbound exit and westbound entrance
Zhonghe	26.603	16.530	26	Zhonghe 2	Yuantong Road – Zhonghe	Eastbound exit and westbound entrance
Zhonghe	28.42	17.66	—		Cty 106 (Jingping Road) – Zhonghe, Yonghe, Xindian	
1.000 mi = 1.609 km; 1.000 km = 0.621 mi: Incomplete access

== See also ==
- Highway system in Taiwan
