= Provincial Highway 65 (Taiwan) =

Road in Taiwan

Provincial Highway 65
- 台65線
- 快速公路五股土城線 (Expressway, Wugu-Tucheng Line)

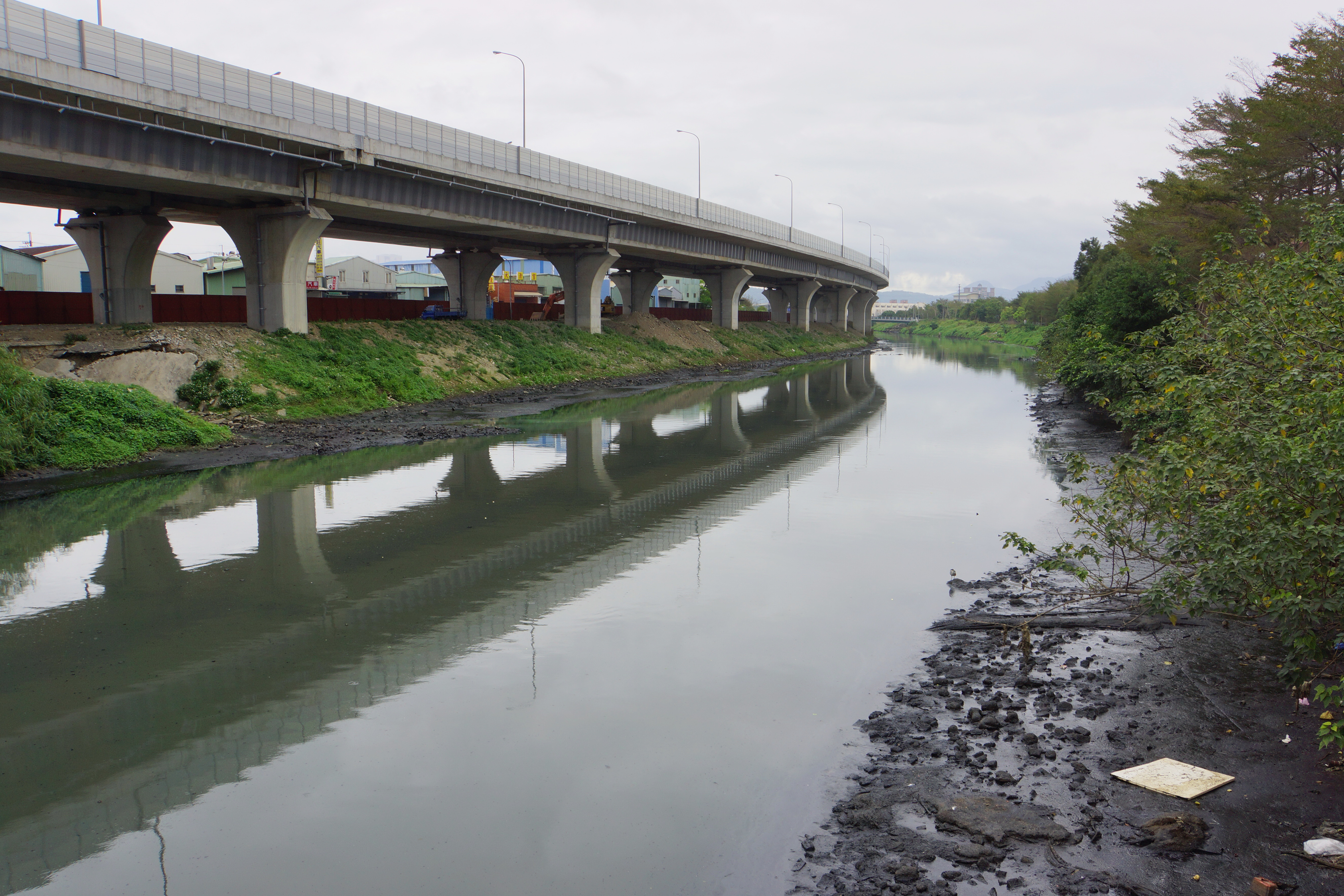

Route information
- Maintained by Directorate General of Highways
- Length: 12.469 km (7.748 mi)
- Existed: 8 December 2010–present

Major junctions
- North end: Nat 1 / Cty 107a in Wugu, New Taipei City
- South end: Prov 3 / Nat 3 in Tucheng, New Taipei City

Location
- Country: Taiwan

Highway system
- Highway system in Taiwan
← Prov 64	→ Prov 66

Provincial Highway 65 (Chinese: 台65線) is an expressway, which begins in Wugu at Freeway 1 and ends in Tucheng at Freeway 3 and Provincial Highway 3. The total length is 12.469 km.

== Exit list ==
The entire route is in New Taipei City.

Location	km	Mile	Exit	Name	Destinations	Notes
Wugu	0	0.0	0	Wugu End	Nat 1 to Prov 64 / Cty 107a – Wugu, Bali	
Taishan	1.2	0.75	1	Taishan	Freeway 1, Taishan	Northbound Exit and Southbound Entrance
Xinzhuang	2.4	1.5	2	Xinzhuang 1	Prov 1 – Xinbei Blvd.	Northbound Exit and Southbound Entrance
Xinzhuang	4.2	2.6	4	Xinzhuang 2	Prov 1a – Zhongzheng Rd.	
Banqiao	6.6	4.1	6	Banqiao 1	Bancheng Rd. - Banqiao	Southbound Exit and Northbound Entrance
Banqiao	8.2	5.1	8	Banqiao 2	Xianmin Blvd. - Banqiao	Southbound Entrance, Northbound Entrance and Exit
Tucheng	11.4	7.1	11	Tucheng 1	Chenglin Rd. - Tucheng, Shulin	Southbound Exit and Northbound Entrance
Tucheng	12.2	7.6	12	Tucheng 2	Prov 3 – Tucheng	Southbound Entrance and Northbound Exit
Tucheng	12.469	7.748	13	Tucheng	Nat 3 / Prov 3 – Sanxia, Zhonghe	
1.000 mi = 1.609 km; 1.000 km = 0.621 mi: Incomplete access

== See also ==
- Highway system in Taiwan
