= Provincial Highway 10 (Taiwan) =

Provincial highway in Taiwan

Provincial Highway 10
- 台10線

Route information
- Maintained by Directorate General of Highways
- Length: 21.13 km (13.13 mi)

Major junctions
- West end: Prov 17 in Qingshui, Taichung
- Prov 61 in Qingshui; Nat 3 in Shalu; Nat 1 in Shengang
- East end: Prov 13 in Fengyuan, Taichung

Location
- Country: Taiwan

Highway system
- Highway system in Taiwan
← Prov 9	→ Prov 11

Provincial Highway 10 (PH 10, Chinese: 台10線)is a short east–west highway that is entirely within the city limits of Taichung. The highway connects the Port of Taichung with the northern suburbs of Qingshui, Shalu, Daya, Shengang, and Fengyuan. The total length of the highway is 21.13 kilometres (13.13 mi).

The highway begins at the Port of Taichung and continues towards downtown Qingshui as Sanmin Rd. (三民路). It is then known as Zhongqing Road (中清路) as it leaves Qingshui. The route then turns in a northeast direction at the intersection with PH 1B in Daya, the latter continues to central Taichung while the former goes to Shengang and Fengyuan as Minsheng Road (民生路) and Zhongzheng Road (中正路).

== Spur routes ==
PH 10B (10乙) is the old segment of Highway 10 between Qingshui and Shalu. When Taichung Airport expanded, a new segment of PH 10 was built, and this segment was renamed PH 10B. The total length is 5.258 kilometres (3.267 mi).
