= Provincial Highway 61 (Taiwan) =

Road in Taiwan

Provincial Highway 61
- 台61線
- West Coast Expressway

Route information
- Maintained by Directorate General of Highways
- Length: 301.834 km (187.551 mi) (completed)
- Existed: July 1991–present

Major junctions
- North end: Prov 2B in Tamsui, New Taipei City
- South end: Cty 173 in Qigu, Tainan City; Taijiang Blvd in Annan, Tainan City (planned)

Location
- Country: Taiwan

Highway system
- Highway system in Taiwan

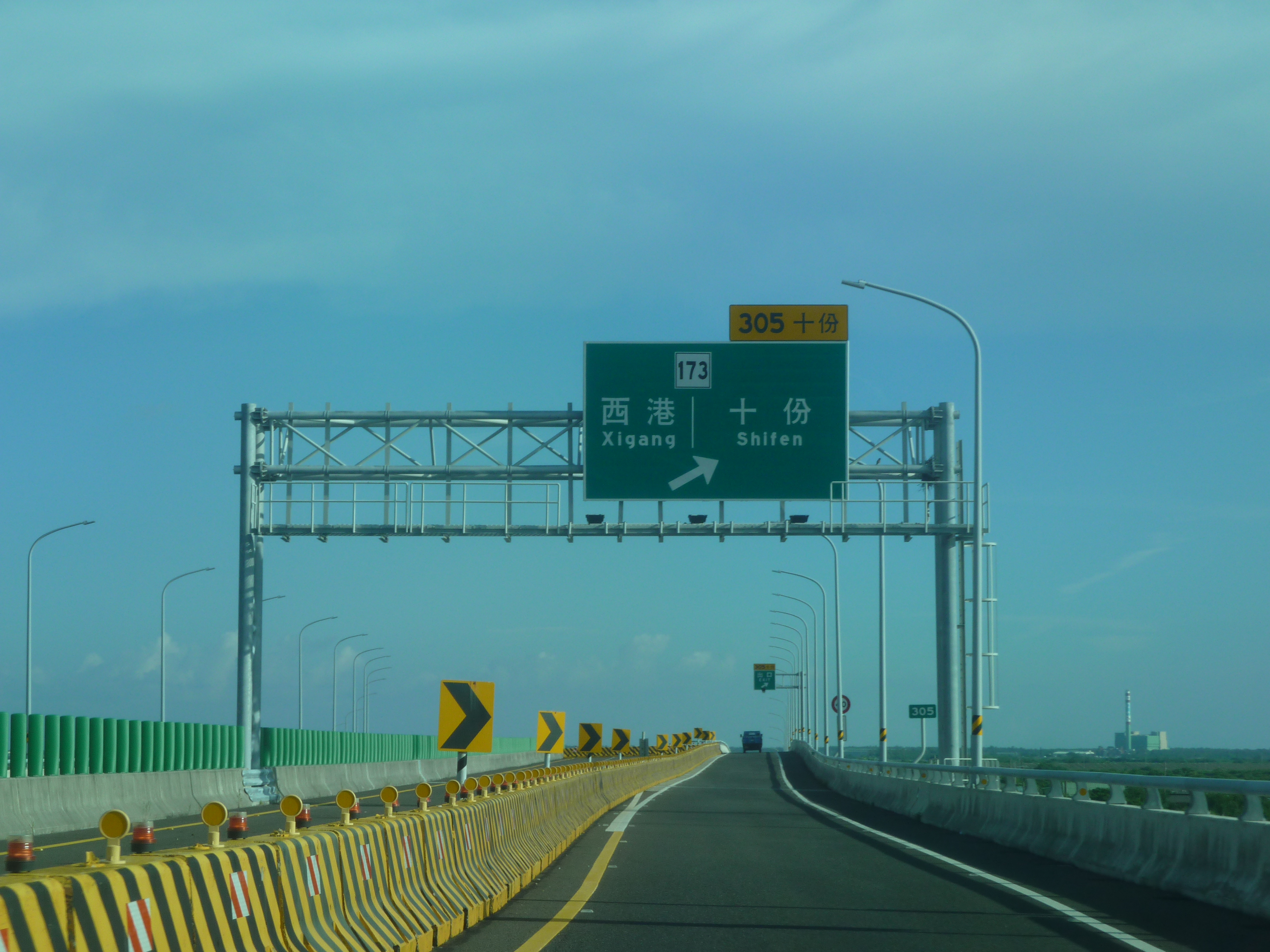
Shifen interchange

Provincial Highway No. 61, usually known as the West Coast Expressway (西部濱海快速公路), is a highway that runs along the west coast of Taiwan. Several sections of the highway are freeway standards with no at-grade intersections, while the rest are local highway standards. There are several sections open for traffic. Others are still under construction.

== Major cities/townships along the route ==
- New Taipei City
- Taoyuan City
- Hsinchu City
- Zhunan, Miaoli
- Houlong, Miaoli
- Tongxiao, Miaoli
- Yuanli, Miaoli
- Taichung City
- Shengang, Changhua
- Lukang, Changhua
- Fuxing, Changhua
- Mailiao, Yunlin
- Kouhu, Yunlin
- Budai, Chiayi
- Tainan City

== Exit list ==
County	Location	km	mi	Exit	Name	Destinations	Notes
New Taipei	Tamsui	0.0	0.0	0	Tamsui End (淡水端)	Prov 2B – Shalun, Tamsui	Northern terminus of highway
New Taipei	Bali	2	1.2	2	Bali 1 (八里一)	Zhongxiao Road-Shisanhang, Bali	
New Taipei	Bali	4	2.5	4	Bali 2 (八里二)	Prov 64 – Port of Taipei, Xindian	Northbound exit and southbound entrance to PH 64 on construction
New Taipei	Bali	6.0	3.7	6	Bali 3 (八里三)	Prov 15 – Bali	
New Taipei	Linkou	14.0	8.7	14	Linkou (林口)	Cty 106 – Linkou	
Taoyuan	Luzhu	19.0	11.8	19	Luzhu (蘆竹)	Prov 15 – Haihu Village, Luzhu	
Taoyuan	Dayuan	28.2	17.5	28	Zhuwei (竹圍)	Prov 4 – Zhuwei Village, Dayuan	Southbound exit and northbound entrance
Taoyuan	Dayuan	30.2	18.8	30	Shalun (沙崙)	Prov 4 – Shalun Village, Dayuan	Northbound exit and southbound entrance
Taoyuan	Dayuan	34.9	21.7	34	Dayuan (大園)	Taoyuan Road 121, Cty 110 – Dayuan→Taoyuan International Airport	
Taoyuan	Guanyin	40.6	25.2	40	Caota (草漯)	Taoyuan Road 35, Taoyuan Road 32-Guanyin→Guanyin Industrial Dist.	
Taoyuan	Guanyin	44.1	27.4	44	Taoyuan Science Park (桃科)	Taoke 9th Road-Taoyuan Science Park	Southbound exit and northbound entrance
Taoyuan	Guanyin	48.7	30.3	48	Guanyin (觀音)	Prov 66 – Guanyin, Daxi	
Taoyuan	Xinwu	54.4	33.8	54	Yong'an (永安)	Cty 114 – Yong'an Village, Xinwu→Yong'an Harbor	
Hsinchu	Xinfeng	63.9	39.7	63	Xinfeng 1 (新豐一)	Hsinchu Road 1-Hongmaogang, Xinfeng	
Hsinchu	Xinfeng	66.2	41.1	66	Xinfeng 2 (新豐二)	Prov 15 – Xinfeng	Northbound exit and southbound entrance
Hsinchu	Zhubei				Fenggang (鳳岡)	Hsinchu Road 4-Fenggang Village, Zhubei	Planned interchange
Hsinchu City	North District				Nanliao（南寮）	Prov 68 – Nanliao, Zhudong	Planned interchange
Hsinchu City	Xiangshan				Gangnan（港南）	Prov 15 – Nanliao	Planned interchange
Miaoli	Zhunan	90.4	56.2	90	West Coast (西濱)	Nat 3 – Zhunan, Xiangshan	Northbound exit and southbound entrance
Miaoli	Houlong	102.9	63.9	102	Xizhou (溪洲)	Cty 126 – Shuiweizi, Houlong	
Miaoli	Houlong	103.7	64.4	103		Prov 72 – Houlong, Shitan	Planned interchange
Miaoli	Houlong	105.3	65.4	105	Houlong (後龍)	Prov 6 / Cty 119 – Gongsiliao, Houlong, Miaoli City	
Miaoli	Houlong	109.3	67.9	109	Chituqi (赤土崎)	Miaoli Road 33-Zhonghe Village, Houlong	
Miaoli	Tongxiao	111.8	69.5	111	Baishatun (白沙屯)	Prov 1 – Tongxiao, Xihu→Baishatun	
Miaoli	Tongxiao	115.0	71.5	115	Xinpu (新埔)	Prov 1 – Xinpu Village, Tongxiao	
Miaoli	Tongxiao	121.3	75.4	121	Tongxiao 1 (通霄一)	Prov 1 – Tongwan Village, Tongxiao	
Miaoli	Tongxiao	122.3	76.0	122	Tongxiao 2 (通霄二)	Cty 121 / Cty 128 – Tongxiao	Southbound exit and northbound entrance
Miaoli	Yuanli	127.0	78.9	127	Yuanli (苑裡)	Miaoli Road 40-Yuangang Village, Yuanli	Southbound exit and northbound entrance
Miaoli	Yuanli	130.4	81.0	130	Fangli (房裡)	Cty 140 – Fangli Village, Yuanli, Sanyi	Southbound exit and northbound entrance
Taichung	Dajia	134.0	83.3	134	Dajia (大甲)	Taichung Road 3-Jianxing Village, Dajia	Northbound exit and southbound entrance
Taichung	Daan	136.9	85.1	136	Fuzhu (福住)	Dongxi 4th Road-Fuzhu Village, Daan	Southbound exit and northbound entrance
Taichung	Daan	139.1	86.4	139	Daan 1 (大安一)	Taichung Road 16, Cty 132 – Haiqian Village, Daan, Dajia	
Taichung	Daan	144.0	89.5	144	Daan 2 (大安二)	Taichung Road 17-Nanpu Village, Daan	Northbound exit and southbound entrance
Taichung	Qingshui	150.0	93.2	150	Qingshui (清水)	Prov 17 / Prov 10 – Qingshui, Shalu→Gaomei Wetland	
Taichung	Wuqi	154.1	95.8	154	Wuqi (梧棲)	Prov 12 – Wuqi→Taichung Port	
Taichung	Longjing	157.6	97.9	157	Longjing (龍井)	Cty 136 – Longjing, Dadu→Taichung Port	
Changhua	Shengang	166.1	103.2	166	Shengang (伸港)	Prov 61B – Shengang, Hemei	
Changhua	Xianxi	169.9	105.6	169	Xianxi (線西)	Cty 138 – Xianxi→Changhua Coastal Industrial Dist.	
Changhua	Lukang	174.8	108.6	174	Yangcuo (洋厝)	Binhai Road-Lukang	
Changhua	Lukang	177.8	110.5	177	Lukang (鹿港)	Lugong Road-Lukang→Changhua Coastal Industrial Dist.	
Changhua	Fuxing	180.0	111.8	180	Fuxing（福興）	Cty 144 – Fuxing, Puyan	
Changhua	Fangyuan	185.0	115.0	185	Hanbao（漢寶）	Prov 17 – Hanbao Village, Fangyuan	
Changhua	Fangyuan	192.3	119.5	192	Wanggong（王功）	Prov 17 – Wanggong Village, Fangyuan→Wanggong Harbor	
Changhua	Fangyuan	197.1	122.5	197	Fangyuan（芳苑）	Prov 17 – Yongxing Village, Fangyuan	
Changhua	Dacheng	208.4	129.5	208	Dacheng（大城）	Cty 152 – Dacheng, Zhutang	
Yunlin	Mailiao	216.4	134.5	216	Qiaotou（橋頭）	Yunlin Special Road 1, Prov 17 / Cty 153A – Qiaotou Village, Mailiao	
Yunlin	Mailiao	221.0	137.3	221	Mailiao（麥寮）	Cty 156 / Cty 153A – Wayao Village, Mailiao	
Yunlin	Taixi	224.9	139.7	224	Huzinei（湖仔內）	Prov 17 – Hefeng Village, Taixi	
Yunlin	Taixi	226.7	140.9	226	Lunfeng（崙豐）	Yunlin Road 116, Prov 17 – Hefeng Village, Taixi	Southbound exit and northbound entrance
Yunlin	Taixi	229.6	142.7	229	Wutiaogang（五條港）	Prov 17 / Cty 155 – Wugang Village, Taixi	
Yunlin	Taixi	233.4	145.0	233	Taixi（台西）	Prov 78 – Taixi, Gukeng	
Yunlin	Sihu	238.7	148.3	238	Sihu（四湖）	Prov 17 / Cty 160 – Feisha Village, Sihu	
Yunlin	Kouhu	247.0	153.5	247	Kouhu（口湖）	Prov 17 / Cty 164 – Jinhu Village, Kouhu	
Yunlin	Kouhu	246	153	Kouhu Rest Area			
Yunlin	Kouhu	253.0	157.2	253	Shuijing（水井）	Yunlin Road 150, Prov 17 – Shuijing Village, Kouhu	
Chiayi	Dongshi	259.5	161.2	259	Aogu（鰲鼓）	Chiayi Road 8-Aogu Village, Dongshi→Aogu Wetland	Southbound exit and northbound entrance
Chiayi	Dongshi	261.8	162.7	261	Dongshi 1（東石一）	Cty 166 – Sanjia Village, Dongshi	Southbound exit and northbound entrance
Chiayi	Dongshi	262.8	163.3	262	Dongshi 2（東石二）	Prov 82 / Cty 168 – Yongtun Village, Dongshi, Shuishang	Northbound exit and southbound entrance
Chiayi	Dongshi	266.0	165.3	266	Baishuihu（白水湖）	Chiayi Road 18-Zhangtan Village, Dongshi	
Chiayi	Budai	270.2	167.9	270	Budai 1（布袋一）	Prov 17 – Longjiang Village, Budai→Budai Harbor	
Chiayi	Budai	272.3	169.2	272	Budai 2（布袋二）	Prov 17 / Cty 172 – Guangfu Village, Budai	
Tainan	Beimen	281.0	174.6	281	Nankunshen（南鯤鯓）	Prov 17 – Kunjiang Village, Beimen	Southbound exit and northbound entrance
Tainan	Beimen	283.7	176.3	283	Beimen（北門）	Prov 84 / Prov 17 – Baoji Village, Beimen, Yujing	
Tainan	Beimen	289.1	179.6	289	Sanliaowan（三寮灣）	Cty 174 / Cty 173A – Sanguang Village, Beimen	
Tainan	Jiangjun	292.0	181.4	292	Jiangjun（將軍）	Tainan Road 25-1-Changsha Village, Jiangjun→Mashagou	
Tainan	Qigu	298.7	185.6	298	Qigu（七股）	Cty 176 – Yancheng Village, Qigu→Qigu Lagoon, Qigu Salt Mountain	
Tainan	Qigu	305.7	190.0	305	Shifen（十份）	Cty 173 – Shifen Village, Qigu→Taijiang National Park	Temporary southern terminus of expressway
Tainan	Annan	308.4	191.6	308	Qingcaolun (青草崙)	Prov 17B – Taijiang Blvd, Annan	Under construction
1.000 mi = 1.609 km; 1.000 km = 0.621 mi: Incomplete access; Unopened

== Intersections with other freeways and expressways ==
- Provincial Highway 64 at Exit 4 (Bali 2) in Bali, New Taipei
- Provincial Highway 66 at Exit 48 (Guanyin) in Guanyin, Taoyuan
- Freeway 3 at Exit 90 (West Coast) in Zhunan, Miaoli
- Provincial Highway 78 at Exit 233 (Taixi Junction) in Taixi, Yunlin
- Provincial Highway 82 at Exit 262 (Dongshi 2) in Dongshi, Chiayi
- Provincial Highway 84 at Exit 283 (Beimen Junction) in Beimen, Tainan

== Auxiliary routes ==
=== Provincial Highway 61A ===
Provincial Highway 61A (defunct)
- Location: Bali, New Taipei
- Length: 2.888 km (1.795 mi)
- Existed: 7 August 2007–29 June 2020
- History: Absorbed into Prov 61

Provincial Highway No. 61A started at the Port of Taipei and ended at an interchange with Provincial Highway 15. It connected PH 61 to the Port of Taipei. It was 2.888 kilometres (1.795 mi) long.

PH 61A was defunct and merged into PH 61 on June 29, 2020.

Exit list
The entire route was in Bali, New Taipei City.

km	Mile	Exit	Name	Destinations	Notes
0.000	0.000	0	Port of Taipei End	Bali, Port of Taipei	Northern terminus
2.888	1.795	2	Bali	Prov 15 – Bali, Linkou	Southern terminus
2.888	1.795	—		Prov 61 south	Continuation beyond southern terminus
1.000 mi = 1.609 km; 1.000 km = 0.621 mi: Route transition

=== Provincial Highway 61B ===

Provincial Highway No. 61B (Changhua Coastal Industrial Park - Hemei IC.) is one of two branch lines of Provincial Highway No. 61. It starts at Shengang Township and ends at National Highway No. 3 Hemei Interchange, Changhua County, which connects National Highway No. 3 and Provincial Highway No. 61. Its length is 6.355 km (3.949 mi). Before 2011, the route was part of Provincial Highway No. 74.

== Dual use ==
The Highway has been constructed in such a way that it can be used as a defensive line in the event of a Chinese invasion.
