= National Freeway 2 =

Road in Taiwan

National freeway 2
- Taoyuan Inner Beltway

Route information
- Maintained by Taiwan Area National Freeway Bureau
- Length: 20.4 km (12.7 mi)
- Existed: 24 August 1997–present

Major junctions
- West end: Taiwan Taoyuan International Airport in Dayuan
- Prov 31 in Luzhu; Nat 1 in Taoyuan District
- East end: Nat 3 in Yingge

Location
- Country: Taiwan

Highway system
- Highway system in Taiwan
← Nat 1	→ Nat 3

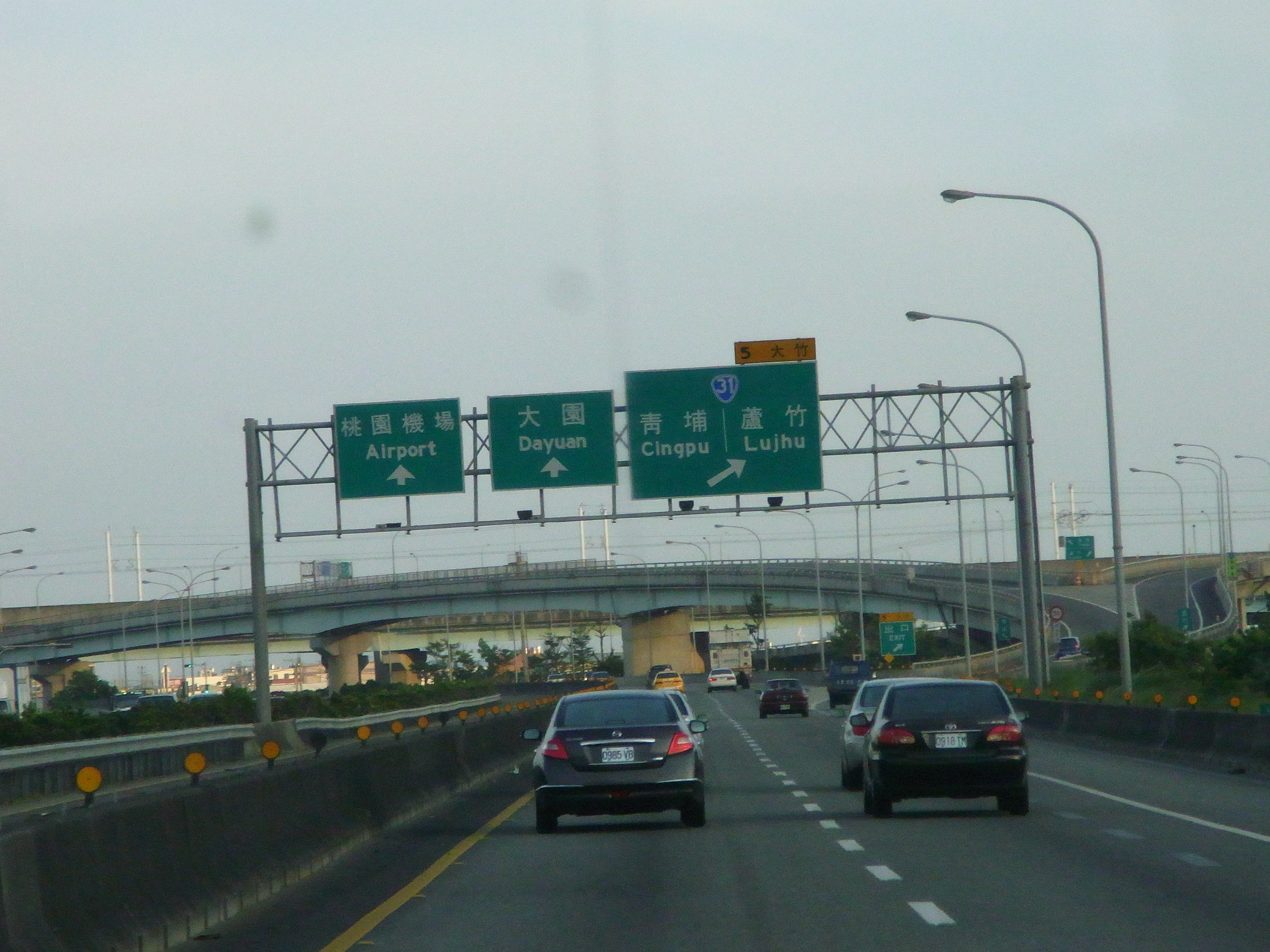
Freeway 2 at Dazhu Interchange

National Freeway 2 (Chinese: 國道二號) is a connector freeway in Taiwan that traverses the special municipalities of Taoyuan City and New Taipei City. The freeway begins at Taiwan Taoyuan International Airport in Dayuan District, Taoyuan City, traveling in a northwest–southeast direction along northern Taoyuan City and ends in Yingge at the junction with National Freeway 3. It is 20.4 km (12.7 mi) long.

The freeway was initially signed as National Freeway 1A (Chinese: 國道一甲) from 1980 to 1997 before the highway was extended to its current eastern terminus in Yingge.

== Route description ==
National Freeway 2 begins as an 8-lane highway (4-lane in each direction) at Taiwan Taoyuan International Airport in Dayuan. The freeway then goes through the suburban districts of Dayuan and Luzhu (Nankan) before reaching National Freeway 1 in Taoyuan District (the former urban area of Taoyuan). In Luzhu, the freeway intersects Provincial Highway 31, which provides access to the nearby Taoyuan HSR station. After the interchange with National Freeway 1, the freeway continues as a 6-lane highway and intersects Daxing West Road (Chinese: 大興西路) in the southwestern edge of Taoyuan district before entering Bade. After the interchange with County Road 110B, the freeway enters New Taipei City for a short stretch before its terminus at National Freeway 3 in Yingge.

The entire freeway has a speed limit of 100 km/h, except for the stretch between the airport and Dayuan interchange (70 km/h for westbound traffic to the airport, and 90 km/h for eastbound traffic from the airport).

== Major cities along the route ==
- Luzhu District
- Taoyuan District
- Bade District

== Exit list ==
County	Location	km	mi	Exit	Name	Destinations	Notes
Taoyuan City	Dayuan	0.0	0.0	—		Taiwan Taoyuan International Airport	
Taoyuan City	Dayuan	0.9	0.56	1	Dayuan	Cty 110 (Zhongzheng East Road) – Dayuan	
Taoyuan City	Luzhu	5.0	3.1	5	Dazhu	Prov 31 (Nanqing Road) – Luzhu, Qingpu	
Taoyuan City	Taoyuan District	9.2	5.7	8	Airport System	Nat 1 – Taipei, Linkou, Zhongli, Hukou, Wugu-Yangmei Elevated Road	Eastbound exit and Westbound entrance only for Wugu-Yangmei Elevated Road
Taoyuan City	Taoyuan District	11.6	7.2	11	South Taoyuan	Taoyuan District	
Taoyuan City	Bade	18.5	11.5	18	Danan	Cty 110B (Fude First Road) – Yingge, Bade	
New Taipei City	Yingge	20.4	12.7	—	Yingge System	Nat 3 – Taipei, Daxi	
1.000 mi = 1.609 km; 1.000 km = 0.621 mi

== Lanes ==
The lanes in each direction are listed below.

- 4 lanes:
  - Taiwan Taoyuan International Airport Top – Danan interchange
- 3 lanes:
  - Danan interchange – Yingge junction

== History ==
The 8.6 km (5.3 mi) section of National Freeway 2 between the Taiwan Taoyuan International Airport (previously named as Chiang Kai-shek International Airport) and National Freeway 1 was opened to traffic in November 1980 to provide faster connections to the main international airport of Taiwan. The freeway was originated designated as National Freeway 1A, a branch of National Freeway 1. Initially a 4-lane highway, this section was eventually widened to 8 lanes in 2011 to alleviate traffic congestion.

When the road was extended to Yingge to connect the newly constructed National Freeway 3 in 1997, the entire route was renumbered as National Freeway 2. In January 2006 Dazhu interchange was built to provide an easy access to the newly constructed Taoyuan HSR station. In April 2013, an interchange to the Wugu-Yangmei elevated road (Chinese: 五股楊梅高架道路), a local bypass to National Freeway 1, was built. The interchange allows westbound entrance for traffic to the airport and eastbound exit for traffic from the airport.

On January 8, 2023, a spur route of the highway, known as Freeway 2A, connecting Freeway 2 and Provincial Highway 15, opened.

== See also ==
- Highway system in Taiwan
