= Alicia Liu =

Taiwanese model and television personality

- Born: 12 June 1986 (age 39); Pingzhen, Taoyuan County, Taiwan
- Other names: Liu Xun-ai; Xiao Ai
- Occupations: Model, television personality
- Modeling information
- Height: 1.71 m (5 ft 7 1/2 in)

Alicia Liu (Chinese: 劉薰愛; pinyin: Liú Xūn'ài, born in Taoyuan County-now Taoyuan City-Taiwan on 12 June 1986) is a Taiwanese model and television personality, sometimes known by the nickname Xiao Ai.

Liu was assigned male at birth, but underwent sex reassignment surgery at the age of 18. She became popular following a number of appearances on a parody television programme, but was outed in January 2010 by a former schoolmate who posted her graduation photo online. In response, Liu held a press conference where she stated that she was happy being a woman and that the past was not important, but only confirmed that she was a transsexual when interviewed by the China Times a week later. Supported by family, colleagues and her agency, Liu said: "To go public with my sex change was more of a help for me than hindrance, and it had not affected my life".
