= Zhuwei Fish Harbor =

Harbor in Dayuan, Taoyuan City, Taiwan

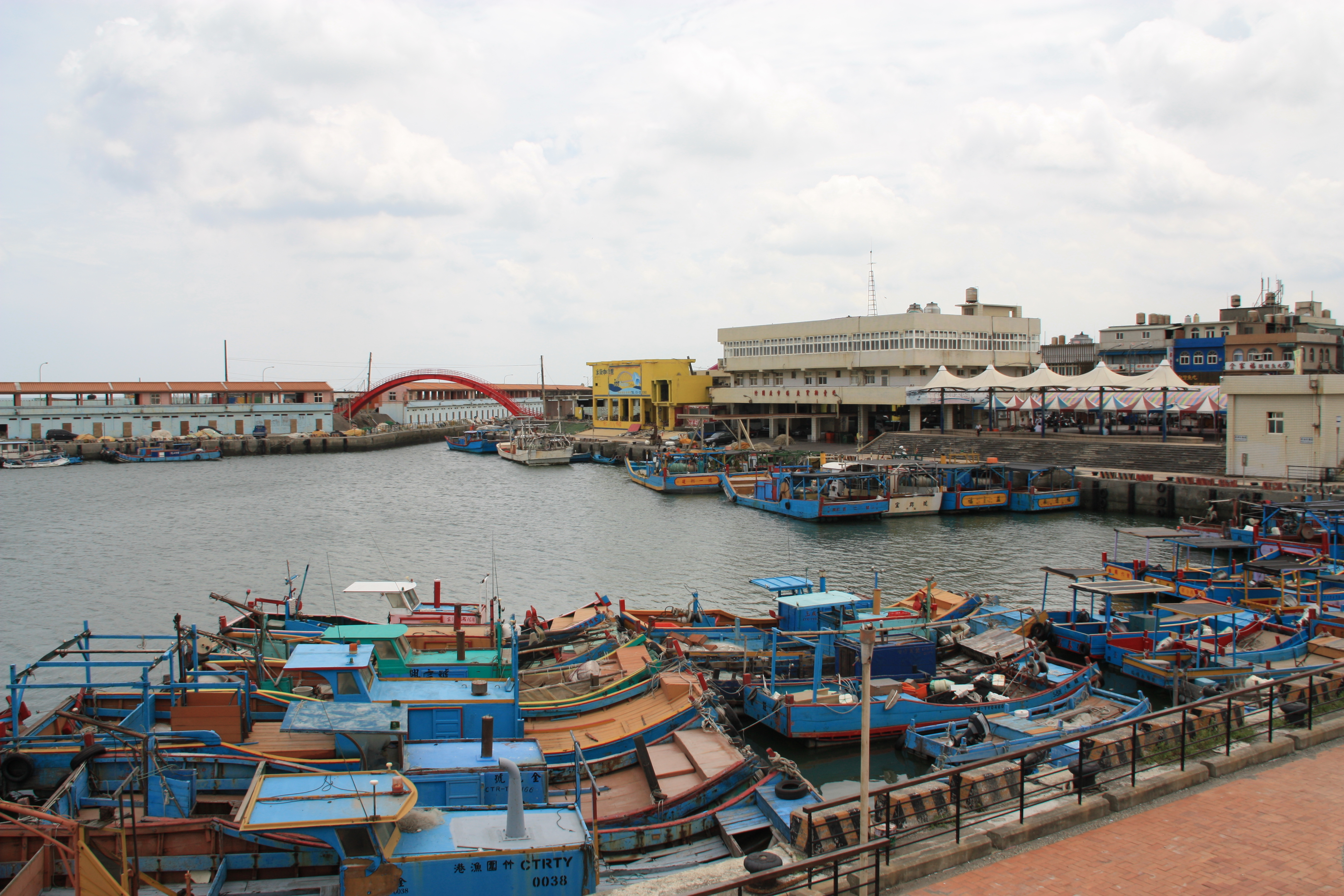
- Interactive map of Zhuwei Fish Harbor
- Location within Taiwan
- Native name: 竹圍漁港

Location
- Location: Dayuan, Taoyuan City, Taiwan
- Coordinates: 25°07′05.5″N 121°14′35.0″E

Details
- Type of Harbor: fishing port

The Zhuwei Fish Harbor (traditional Chinese: 竹圍漁港; simplified Chinese: 竹围渔港; pinyin: Zhúwéi Yúgǎng) is a fishing port in Dayuan District, Taoyuan City, Taiwan.

== History ==
The harbor used to be an international trading port. It was then later redeveloped into a tourist harbor.

== Architecture ==
The harbor features fish market with 77 fish vendors and food preparation section. All of the fishing boats at the harbor are working with a one-day returning turn.

== Popular culture ==
The harbor is one of the shooting venue for the television drama PS Man.

== Transportation ==
The harbor is accessible by bus from Taoyuan Station of Taiwan Railway.

== See also ==
- Fisheries Agency
