= Provincial Highway 82 (Taiwan) =

Road in Chiayi County, Taiwan

Provincial Highway 82
- 台82線
- 台西古坑線 (Dongshi-Chiayi Expressway)

Route information
- Maintained by Directorate General of Highways
- Length: 33.959 km (21.101 mi)
- Existed: October 2000–present

Major junctions
- West end: Cty 168 in Dongshi, Chiayi
- Prov 61 in Dongshi, Chiayi; Nat 1 in Shuishang, Chiayi
- East end: Nat 3 in Shuishang, Chiayi

Location
- Country: Taiwan

Highway system
- Highway system in Taiwan
← Prov 78	→ Prov 84

Provincial Highway 82 (Chinese: 台82線) is an expressway in Chiayi County, Taiwan, which begins in Dongshi Township and ends in Shuishang Township on National Highway No. 3.

== Exit List ==
The entire route is within Chiayi County.

City	Location	km	Mile	Exit	Name	Destinations	Notes
Chiayi County	Dongshi	0	0.0	-		Cty 168	West end of CR 168 overlap
Chiayi County	Dongshi	2	1.2	-		Prov 61	
Chiayi County	Dongshi	4.5	2.8	-		Cty 168	East end of CR 168 overlap
Chiayi County	Puzi	8.2	5.1	Begin Freeway			
Chiayi County	Puzi	10.1	6.3	10	Puzi	Prov 19 – Puzi, Yizhu	
Chiayi County	Lucao	14.4	8.9	14	Xianghe	TR cy45 – Taibao, Lucao	
Chiayi County	Lucao	18.6	11.6	18	Lucao	Cty 167 – Taibao, Lucao	
Chiayi County	Shuishang	22.5	14.0	22	Chiayi System	Nat 1 – Chiayi City, Xinying	
Chiayi County	Shuishang	25.9	16.1	25	Shuishang	Prov 1 / Cty 163 – Shuishang, Houbi	
Chiayi County	Shuishang	30.6	19.0	30	Zhonghe	TR cy175 – Chiayi City, Baihe	
Chiayi County	Zhongpu	32.7	20.3	32	Chiayi	Cty 165 – Chiayi City, Baihe	
Chiayi County	Shuishang	33.959	21.101	34	Shuishang System	Nat 3 – Zhongpu, Baihe	
1.000 mi = 1.609 km; 1.000 km = 0.621 mi: Incomplete access

== Major Cities Along the Route ==
- Puzi City
- Taibao City
- Chiayi City

== Intersections with other Freeways and Expressways ==
- National Highway No. 1 at Chiayi JCT. in Shuishang, Chiayi
- National Highway No. 3 at Shuishang JCT in Shuishang, Chiayi

== See also ==
- Highway system in Taiwan
