= Provincial Highway 15 (Taiwan) =

Provincial highway in Taiwan

Provincial Highway 15
- 台15線
- Xibin Highway

Route information
- Maintained by Directorate General of Highways
- Length: 83.9 km (52.1 mi)

Major junctions
- North end: Prov 2 in Tamsui, New Taipei City
- Prov 66 in Guanyin
- South end: Prov 61 in Hsinchu City

Location
- Country: Taiwan

Highway system
- Highway system in Taiwan
← Prov 14	→ Prov 16

Provincial Highway 15 is a north–south highway that connects Tamsui in New Taipei City with Hsinchu City. The highway is known as Xibin Highway (西濱公路) for the entire stretch. The highway runs along the coasts of northwestern Taiwan. The total length is 83.9 kilometres (52.1 mi; 45.3 nmi).

== Route description ==
The highway begins at the intersection of PH 2 in Tamsui. After crossing through Tamsui River via Guandu Bridge, the highway enters Bali before turning towards the coast. The highway then runs along the coasts of northwestern Taiwan for the remainder of the route. After leaving Bali, the highway passes Linkou and enters Taoyuan City. In Taoyuan the highway passes through the coastal districts of Luzhu, Dayuan, Guanyin, and Xinwu. The stretch in Dayuan is the crash site of China Airlines Flight 676. The highway then enters Hsinchu County, passing through Xinfeng and Zhubei before ending at Hsinchu City. The highway shares a concurrency with PH 61 in Xinfeng and runs parallel to the latter between Xinfeng and Hsinchu.

== Spur route ==
- PH 15: The highway connects the parent route with PH 61 (Xibin Expressway, 西濱快速道路) in Dayuan District, Taoyuan City. The total length is 1.6 kilometres (0.99 mi; 0.86 nmi) , this road was decommissioned following January 12, 2026, and a stretch of this highway was merged into PH 4.
