= Provincial Highway 66 (Taiwan) =

Road in Taiwan

Provincial Highway 66
- 台66線
- 東西向快速公路觀音大溪線 (East-West Expressway, Guanyin-Daxi Line)

Route information
- Maintained by Directorate General of Highways
- Length: 27.259 km (16.938 mi)
- Existed: 20 January 2001–present

Major junctions
- West end: Prov 61 in Guanyin
- Prov 15 in Guanyin; Prov 31 in Xinwu; Nat 1 in Pingzhen; Prov 1 in Pingzhen
- East end: Cty 112A in Daxi

Location
- Country: Taiwan

Highway system
- Highway system in Taiwan
| ← Prov 65 | → Prov 68 |

Provincial Highway 66 (Chinese: 台66線) is an expressway, which begins in Guanyin District, Taoyuan City on Provincial Highway 61 and ends in Daxi District, Taoyuan City, on County Road 112A.

== Major urban areas along the route ==
- Yangmei District
- Pingzhen District
- Zhongli District
- Daxi District

== Major intersections ==
| City | Location | km | Mile | Exit | Name | Destinations | Notes |
|---|---|---|---|---|---|---|---|
| Taoyuan City | Guanyin | 0.000 | 0.000 | 0 | Guanyin | Prov 61 – Dayuan, Yong'an, Xinfeng | |
| Taoyuan City | Guanyin | 1.018 | 0.633 | | | Prov 15 – Dayuan, Yong'an, Xinfeng | |
| Taoyuan City | Guanyin | 2.038 | 1.266 | | | TR 89 – Guanyin, Baosheng | |
| Taoyuan City | Guanyin | | | | | TR 94 – Guanyin, Baosheng | |
| Taoyuan City | Guanyin | 5.111 | 3.176 | 5 | Guanyin 1 | Cty 115 – Guanyin, Xinwu | Interchange |
| Taoyuan City | Guanyin | 7.185 | 4.465 | | | TR 84 – Xinpo, Xinwu | |
| Taoyuan City | Xinwu | 8.458 | 5.256 | | | TR 82 – Fuyuan, Xinwu | |
| Taoyuan City | Xinwu | 9.000 | 5.592 | West end of freeway | | | |
| Taoyuan City | Xinwu | 10.800 | 6.711 | 10 | Xinwu | Cty 114 (Zhongshan East Road) – Zhongli, Xinwu | |
| Taoyuan City | Xinwu | 12.400 | 7.705 | 12 | Xinwu 1 | Prov 31 north – THSR Taoyuan Station, Yangmei District | Eastbound exit and westbound entrance |
| Taoyuan City | Xinwu | 13.600 | 8.451 | 13 | Xinwu 1 | Prov 31 north – THSR Taoyuan Station, Zhongli District | Westbound exit and eastbound entrance |
| Taoyuan City | Yangmei | 15.221 | 9.458 | - | | TR 102 – Xinrong, Gaorong | Westbound exit and eastbound entrance |
| Taoyuan City | Pingzhen | 17.738 | 11.022 | 18 | Pingzhen System | Nat 1 – Hsinchu, Taipei | |
| Taoyuan City | Pingzhen | 18.702 | 11.621 | 19 | Pingzhen 1 | Prov 1 (Yanping Road) – Zhongli, Pingzhen | Eastbound exit and westbound entrance |
| Taoyuan City | Pingzhen | 20.253 | 12.585 | 20 | Pingzhen 2 | Cty 113 (Zhongfeng Road) – Zhongli, Longtan | |
| Taoyuan City | Pingzhen | 23.181 | 14.404 | 23 | Pingzhen 3 | Cty 113A (Jinling Road) – Zhongli, Pingzhen, Longtan | |
| Taoyuan City | Daxi | 27.259 | 16.938 | 27 | Daxi End | Cty 112A (Yongchang Road) to Nat 3 – Daxi | |
1.000 mi = 1.609 km; 1.000 km = 0.621 mi: Incomplete access

== Notes ==
The elevation of the main line between Provincial Highway 31 and Township Road 102 was completed in June 2014.
