= Provincial Highway 13 (Taiwan) =

Provincial highway in Taiwan

Provincial Highway 13
- 台13線
- Jianfeng Highway

Route information
- Maintained by Directorate General of Highways
- Length: 69.6 km (43.2 mi)

Major junctions
- North end: Prov 1 in Hsinchu City
- Nat 3 in Hsinchu City; Nat 1 in Touwu and Sanyi; Nat 4 in Fengyuan
- South end: Prov 3 in Fengyuan, Taichung

Location
- Country: Taiwan

Highway system
- Highway system in Taiwan
← Prov 12	→ Prov 14

Provincial Highway 13 is a north–south highway that connects Hsinchu City with Fengyuan, a suburb in Taichung City. The highway is known as Jianfeng Highway (尖豐公路) from Toufen to Fengyuan. The total length is 69.6 kilometers.

== Route Description ==
The highway begins at Xiangshan District, a district southwest of downtown Hsinchu City. The road then continues through Miaoli County and is one of the most important highways for the county. The highway passes through Zhunan, Toufen, Zaoqiao, Touwu, Miaoli City, Tongluo and Sanyi before heading to Taichung City. In Touwu the highway passes through Mingte Dam, which supplies water for the county and is a popular tourist destination. In Miaoli City the highway passes through the scenic foothills rather than enters downtown. The highway also provides access to old town Sanyi, a popular destination known for its woodcarving and unique geological features. Entering Taichung City, the highway passes through the suburban district of Houli before ending at Fengyuan.

== Spur Route ==
Prov 13a: The highway is an old segment of its parent route from Zhunan to Miaoli City, both in Miaoli County. The total length is 14.8 km.
