= Pingzhen District =

District in Taoyuan City, Taiwan

Pingzhen 平鎮區 Pingjhen
- District
- Pingzhen District
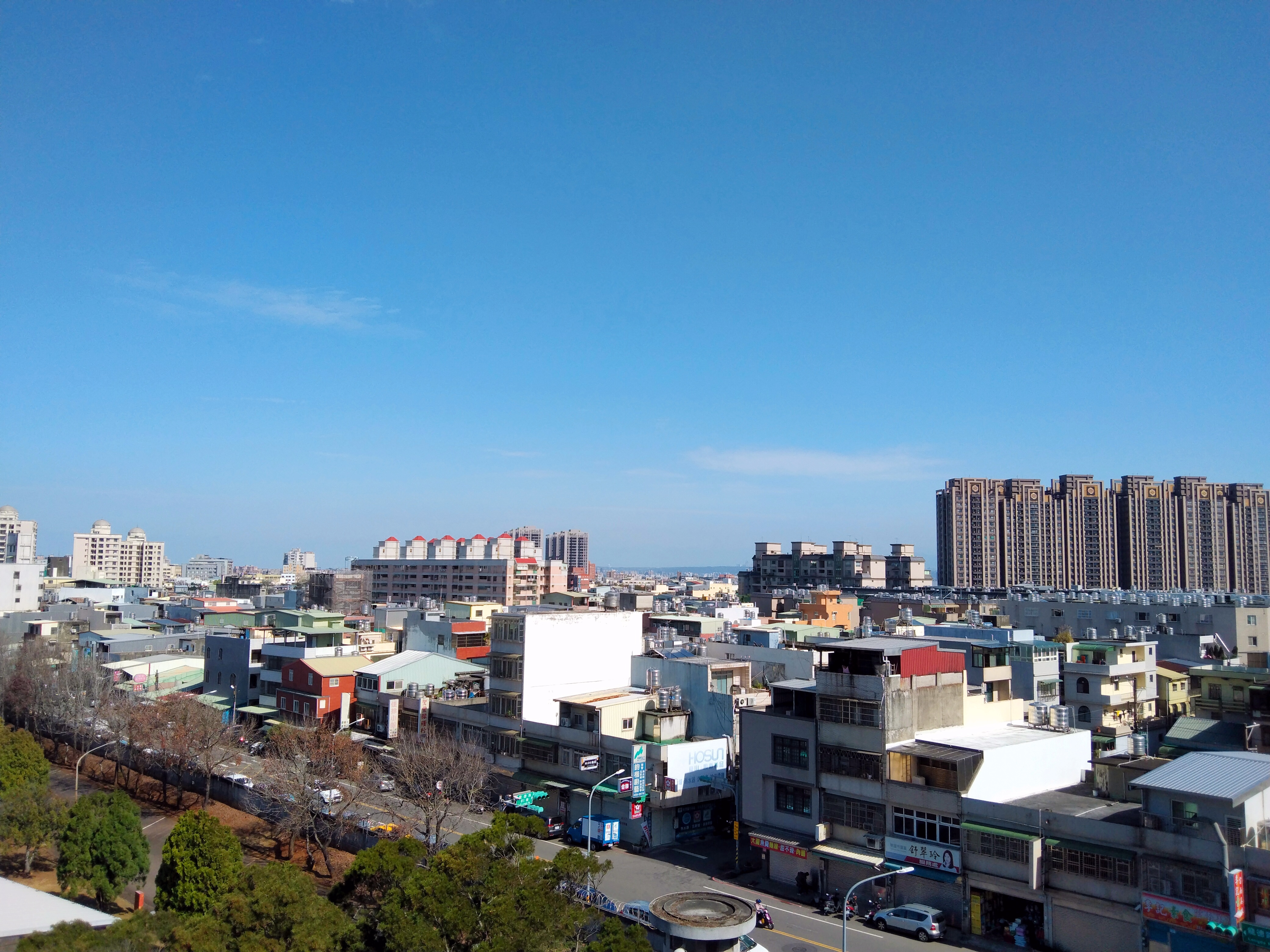

- Coordinates: 24°56′38″N 121°12′58″E
- Country: Taiwan
- Municipality: Taoyuan City

Area
  - Total: 47.7532 km^{2} (18.4376 sq mi)

Population (March 2023)
  - Total: 228,513
  - Density: 4,785.29/km^{2} (12,393.8/sq mi)
- Website: www.pingzhen.tycg.gov.tw (in Chinese)

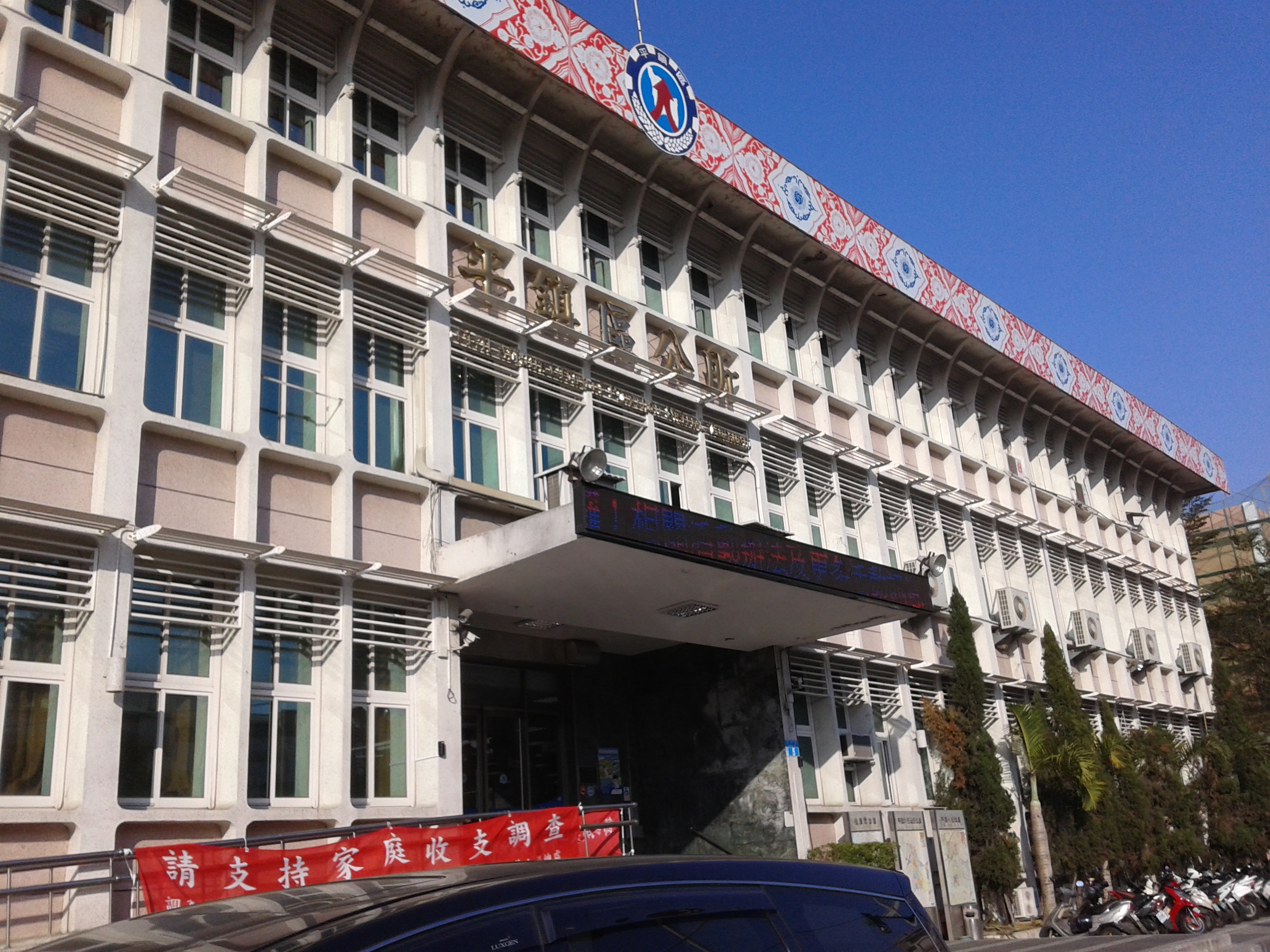
Pingzhen District office

Pingzhen District (Chinese: 平鎮區; pinyin: Píngzhèn Qū) is a district in the central part of Taoyuan City, Taiwan, home to 227,047 people.

== History ==
Pingzhen was originally established as Changluliao during the Qing Dynasty rule of Taiwan. In 1920 under the Japanese rule, the city was renamed to Pingzhen. On 1 March 1992, it was upgraded from a rural township as the third county-administered city of Taoyuan County named Pingzhen City. On 25 December 2014, it was upgraded to a district named Pingzhen District when Taoyuan County was upgraded from a county to a municipality.

== Geography ==
The district spans over 47.75km^{2} of area. It is located on a hilly plateau and the entire district is on a slope.

== Demographics ==
Pingzhen District has a population of 228,513 people as of March 2023. Most people in Pingzhen are Hakka.

== Administrative divisions ==
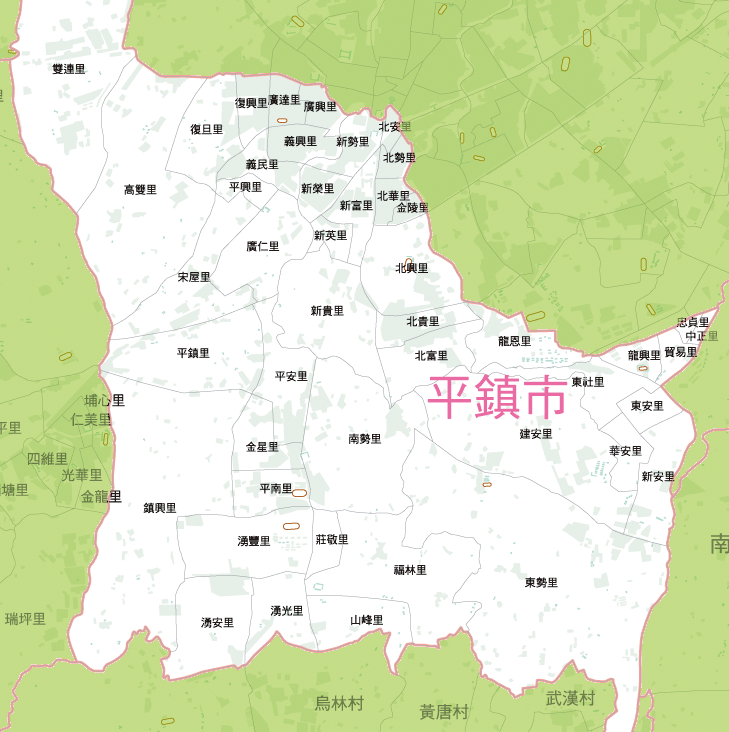
Administrative divisions of Pingzhen District (then Pingzhen City)

Pingzeng, Zengxing, Nanshi, Jinxing, Pingan, Pingnan, Shanfeng, Fulin, Yongguang, Zhuangjing, Yongfeng, Yongan, Songwu, Pingxing, Guangxing, Guangda, Guangren, Fudan, Fuxing, Yimin, Yixing, Shuanglian, Gaoshuang, Beishi, Beihua, Xinshi, Beian, Xinrong, Xinfu, Xinying, Xingui, Beixing, Jinling, Beigui, Beifu, Jianan, Huaan, Tungan, Xinan, Tungshi, Longen, Tungshe, Zhongzhen, Maoyi, Longxing and Zhongzheng Village.

== Tourist Attractions and Parks ==
- Xinshi Park
- Bazizhen Riverside Park

== Politics ==
The district is part of Taoyuan City Constituency V electoral district for the Legislative Yuan.

== Transportation ==
Pingzhen railway station

- National Highway No. 1
- Provincial Highway No. 1
- Provincial Highway No. 66
- City Routes 112, 113, 113A, and 114
- Taiwan Railway: Pingzhen (2026)

== Notable natives ==
- Alicia Liu, model and television personality
- Chu Mu-yen, taekwondo practitioner

== See also ==
- Taoyuan City
