= Wugu District =

District in New Taipei, Taiwan

Wugu 五股區 Wuku, Goko
- District
- Wugu District
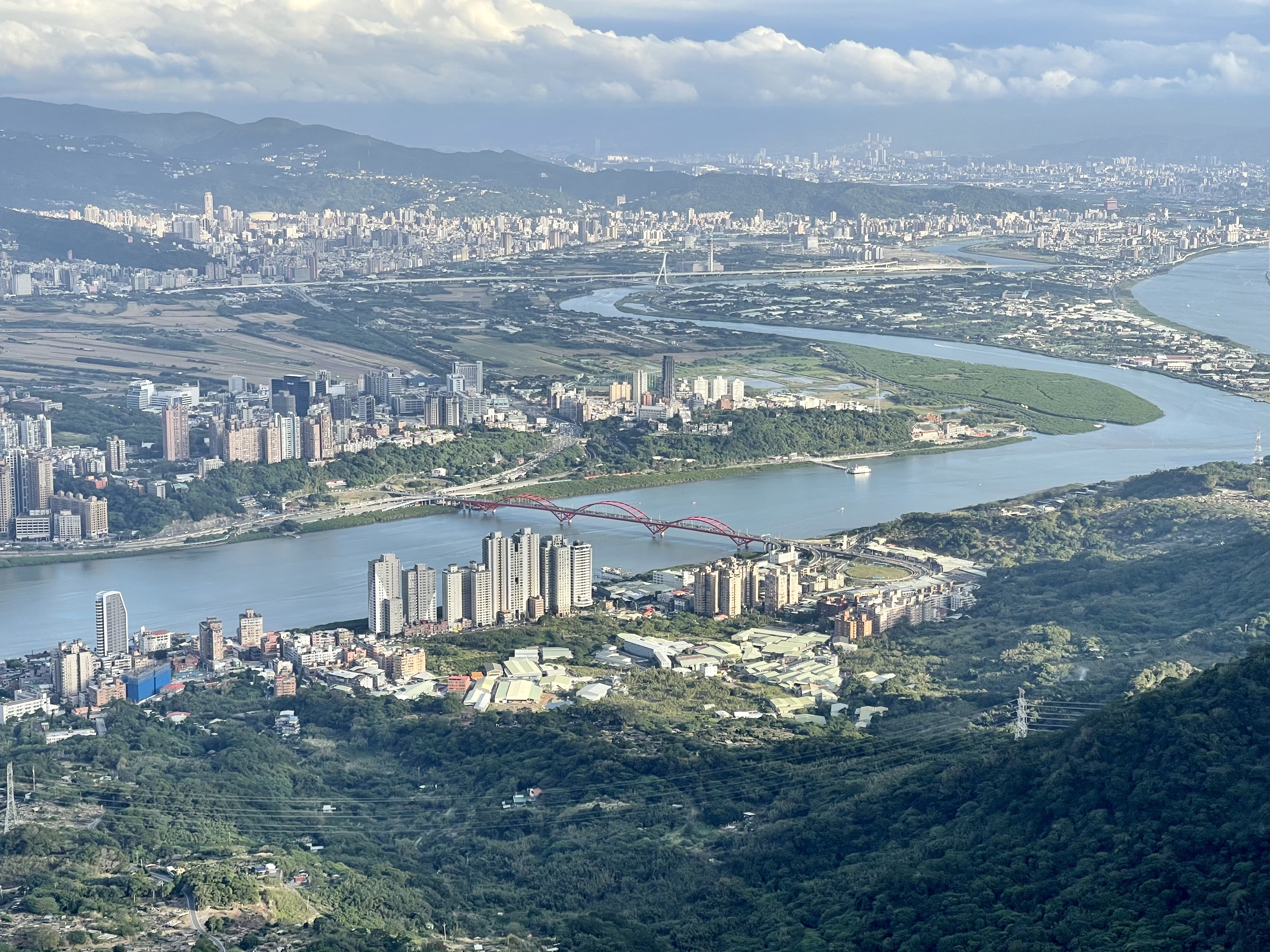

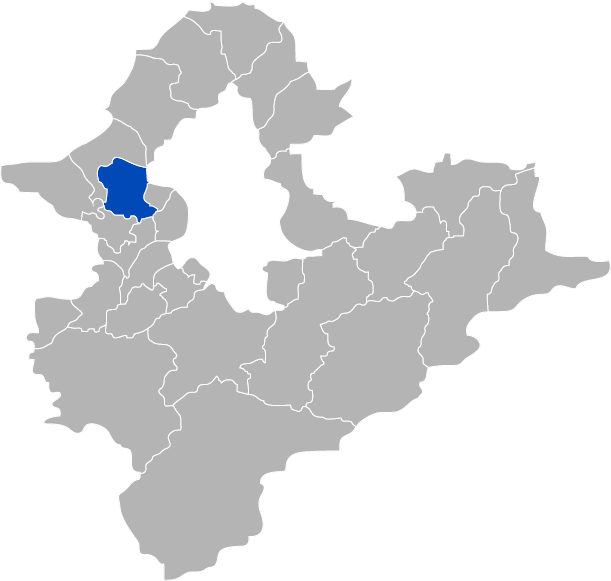
- Wugu District in New Taipei City
- Coordinates: 025°04′24″N 121°25′42″E
- Country: Republic of China (Taiwan)
- Special municipality: New Taipei City

Area
  - Total: 34.86 km^{2} (13.46 sq mi)

Population (February 2023)
  - Total: 91,719
  - Density: 2,631/km^{2} (6,814/sq mi)
- Time zone: +8
- Website: www.wugu.ntpc.gov.tw (in Chinese)

Wugu District (Chinese: 五股區; pinyin: Wǔgǔ Qū; Pe̍h-ōe-jī: Gō͘-kó͘-khu) is a suburban district in the western part of New Taipei City in northern Taiwan. It has an area of 34.86 km^{2} and a population of 90,465 people (2022).

== History ==
In the 19th century the area was known as Go-ko-khi (Chinese: 五穀坑; Pe̍h-ōe-jī: Ngó͘-kok-khiⁿ; also 五股坑; Gō͘-kó͘-khiⁿ). Until the creation of New Taipei on 25 December 2010, Wugu was a rural township (Chinese: 五股鄉; pinyin: Wǔgǔ Xiāng; Pe̍h-ōe-jī: Gō͘-kó͘-hiong; Postal: Wuku) in the former Taipei County.

Notorious Kuomintang general Chen Yi was interred in Wugu following his execution.

== Tourist attractions ==
- Mount Guanyin
- New Taipei City Exhibition Hall
- New Taipei Metropolitan Park

== Transportation ==
Wugu is served by the Zhongshan Freeway (National Highway No. 1) and Provincial Highway No. 64

== Notable natives ==
- Lin Chih-chia, Secretary-General of the 9th Legislative Yuan

== See also ==
- New Taipei City
