= Dayuan District =

Dayuan 大園區 Ōsono
- District
- Dayuan District
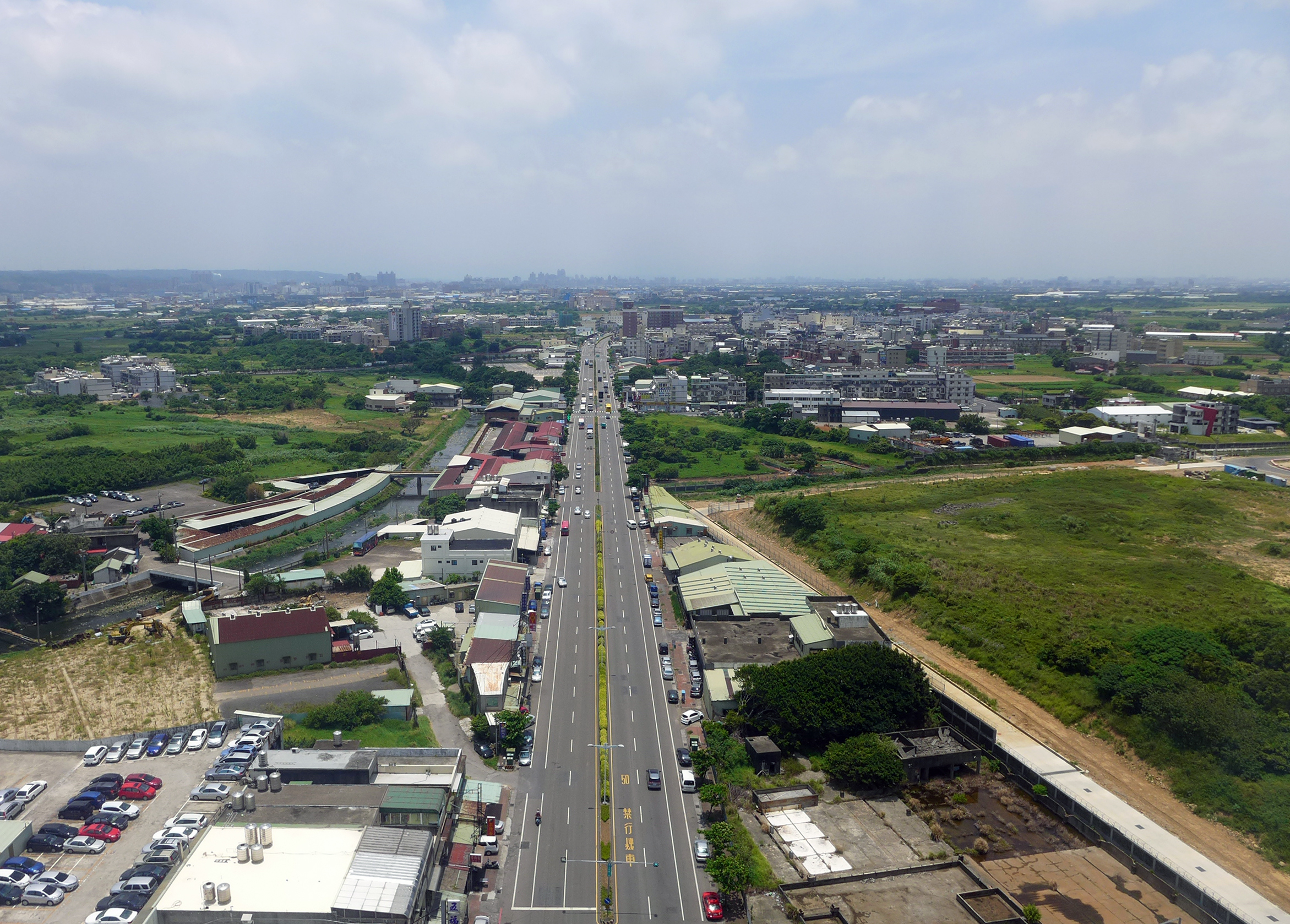

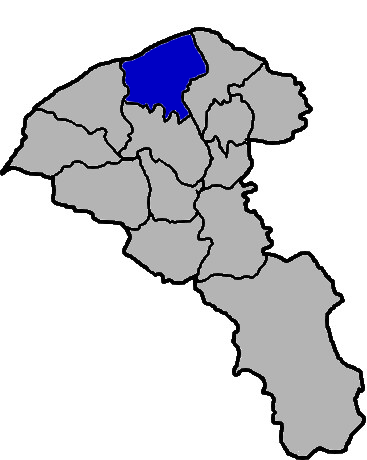
- Coordinates: 25°03′N 121°11′E
- Country: Taiwan
- Municipality: Taoyuan City

Government
  - Mayor: Lu Shuitian

Area
  - Total: 87.3925 km^{2} (33.7424 sq mi)

Population (February 2023)
  - Total: 86,007
  - Density: 984.15/km^{2} (2,548.9/sq mi)
- Website: www.dayuan.tycg.gov.tw (in Chinese)

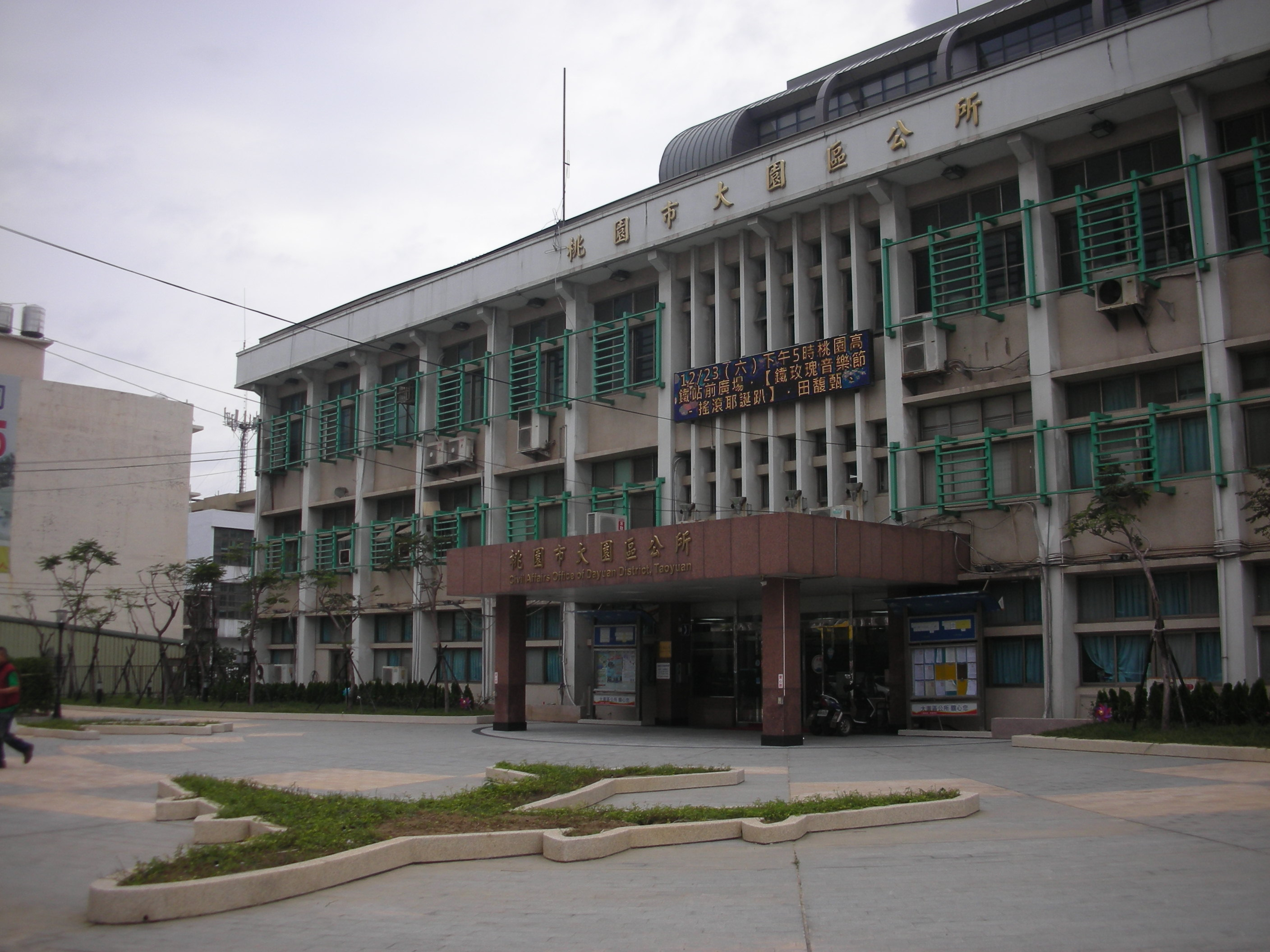
Dayuan District Office

Dayuan District (Chinese: 大園區; pinyin: Dàyuán Qū; Taiwanese: Tuā-hn̂g-khu), formerly known as Dayuan Township (Chinese: 大園鄕; pinyin: Dàyuán Xiāng; Taiwanese: Tuā-hn̂g-hiong) is a coastal district in northwestern Taoyuan City, Taiwan.

== History ==
Dayuan District was originally named Toa-khu-hng (Chinese: 大坵園; Pe̍h-ōe-jī: Toā-khu-hn̂g), literally means a vast (大) vegetable garden (坵園) as an old Chinese name). In the earlier days, cottage scattered around the district with very limited settlers that grows vegetable and sweet potatoes. Hoklo people migrated to the area during the rule of Kangxi. In avoidance of the invasion of Yue people, walled villages were built around the settlements of Hoklo people. It was renamed Ōsono Village (大園庄) during Japanese rule, and was part of Tōen District, Shinchiku Prefecture. After the handover of Taiwan from Japan to the Republic of China, it was called Dayuan Township. It became Dayuan District in 2014, when Taoyuan County became a special municipality (and the former city of Taoyuan became a district of the special municipality).

== Geography ==
=== Demographics ===
The population in 1986 was 56,995. By the end of February 2023, the total population had grown to 86,007. It is considered a slow population growing district.

- Area: 87.3925 km^{2}
- Population: 86,007 people (February 2023)

=== Topology ===
Dayuan District has an inclining topography from southwest to northwest with an average height of 35 meters above sea level. Inland area are mostly plains, rice fields or spacious flat lands, while in the northeast part is the prolonged sand beach seacoast.

=== Climate ===
The district lies in the subtropic monsoon climate region. In winter, northwest monsoon is stronger and in the coldest months, the average temperature is about 11 °C. In summer, it rains a lot but it is free from droughts during the winter seasons.

== Administrative divisions ==
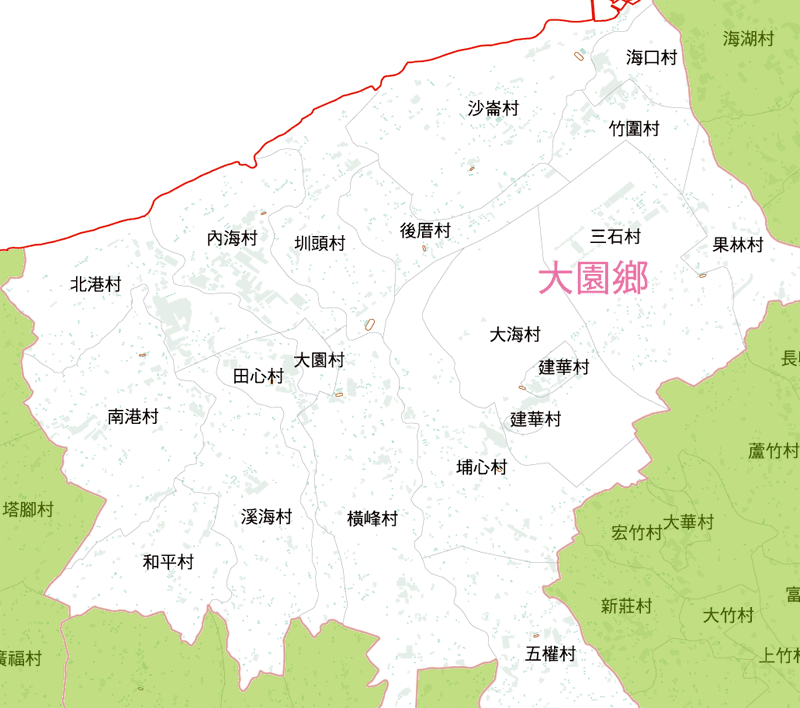
Villages in Dayuan District

The district consists of 18 villages and 407 neighborhoods. The villages are:

- Dahai Village
- Dayuan Village
- Guolin Village
- Haikou Village
- Hengfong Village
- Heping Village
- Houcuo Village
- Jhuwei Village
- Nangang Village
- Neihai Village
- Peikang Village
- Pusin Village
- Sanshih Village
- Shalun Village
- Sihai Village
- Tiansin Village
- Wucyuan Village
- Zuntou Village

== Economy ==
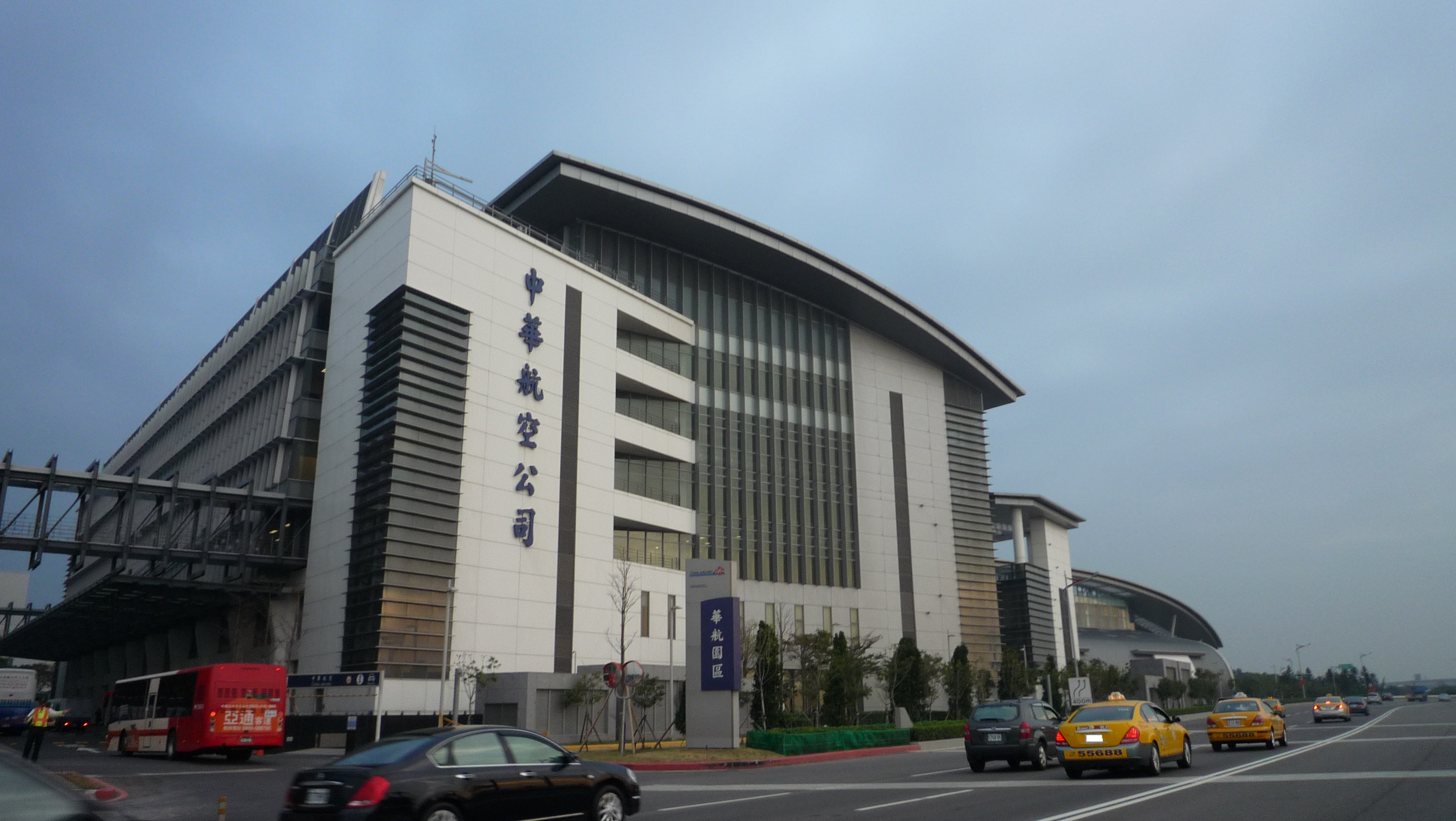
CAL Park, the China Airlines headquarters on the grounds of Taiwan Taoyuan International Airport

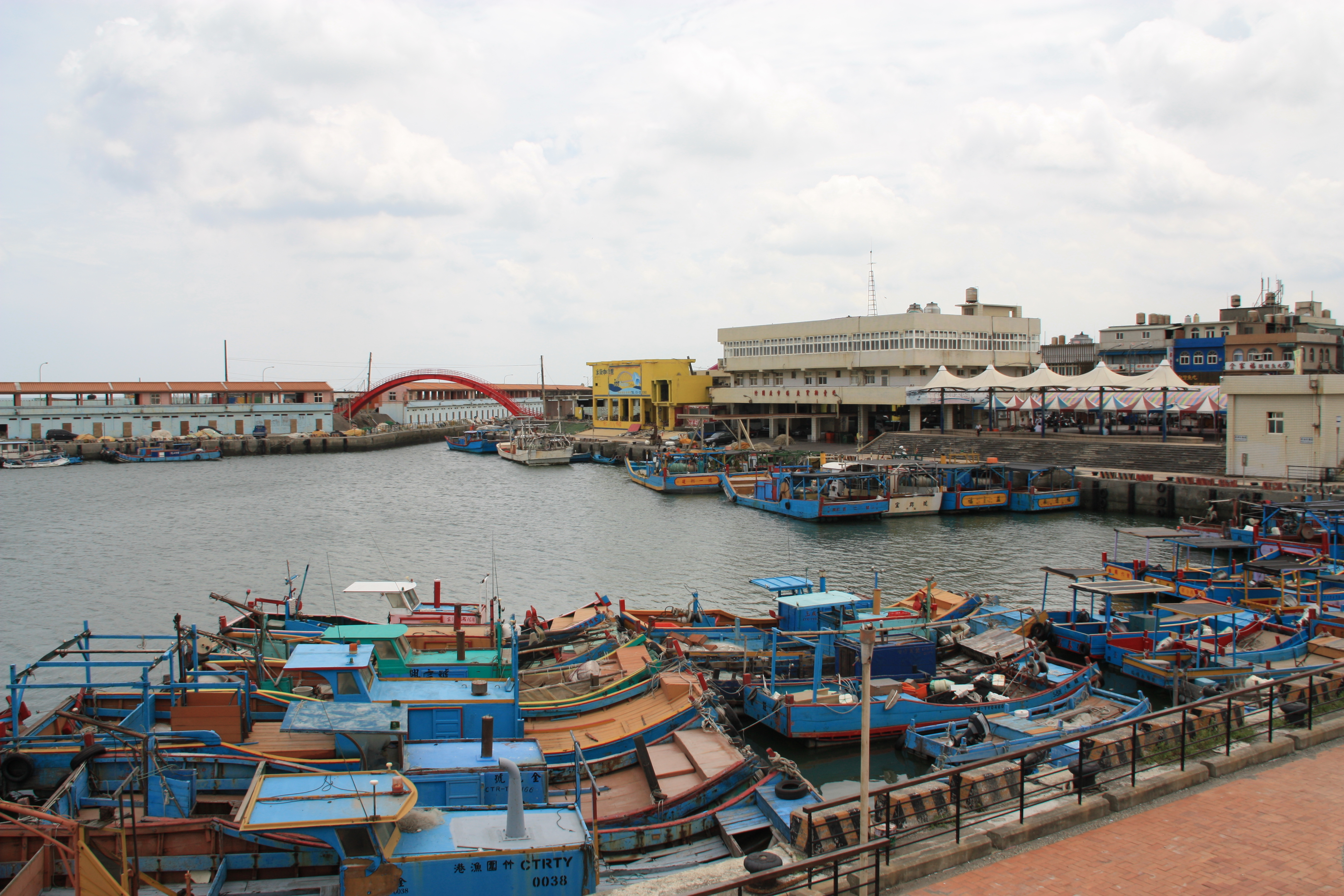
Zhuwei Fish Harbor

=== Transportation ===
China Airlines's headquarters, CAL Park, is on the grounds of Taiwan Taoyuan International Airport in Dayuan District. Evergreen Airlines Services Corporation, Evergreen Aviation Technologies Corp., and Evergreen Air Cargo Services Corporation, subsidiaries of Evergreen Group, are also headquartered in Dayuan.

=== Agriculture ===
The main agriculture products of the district are paddy rice, watermelons, crops, vegetables, peanuts etc. To improve the agriculture industry, various innovations have been introduced in the area, such as the plantation of various types of flowers and plants for export and import markets, plantation of green onions and the development of shelf network of room vegetables and other crops.

=== Fishery ===
Fishery products are mostly in the irrigated ponds with a lot of grass carps, silver carps, carps, tilapia etc. The district has the biggest fishing port in Taoyuan County with a capacity of 50 ships in the interior part and 100 ships in the exterior part. Main fish species including pomfrets, sharks and mullets.

=== Industry ===
The district houses the Dayuan Specialized Industry Park, Dayuan Extended Industry Park and Chun-Fa Industry Park. The main industries including chemical products, leather products, dyes, papermaking, metal, textiles, electronic and electric appliances manufacturing, food processing etc.

=== Commerce ===
The main commerce industry is retailing business, such as department stores, restaurants, silver-goods shops, furniture, electric appliances, finance, automobiles, motorcycles, gas stations, parking lots etc.

== Education ==
The district is home to one private senior high school, two public junior high schools, 12 public elementary schools, 17 public nursery schools, 11 private nursery schools, 3 private kindergartens. It also houses one district library and one community library.

== Tourist attractions ==
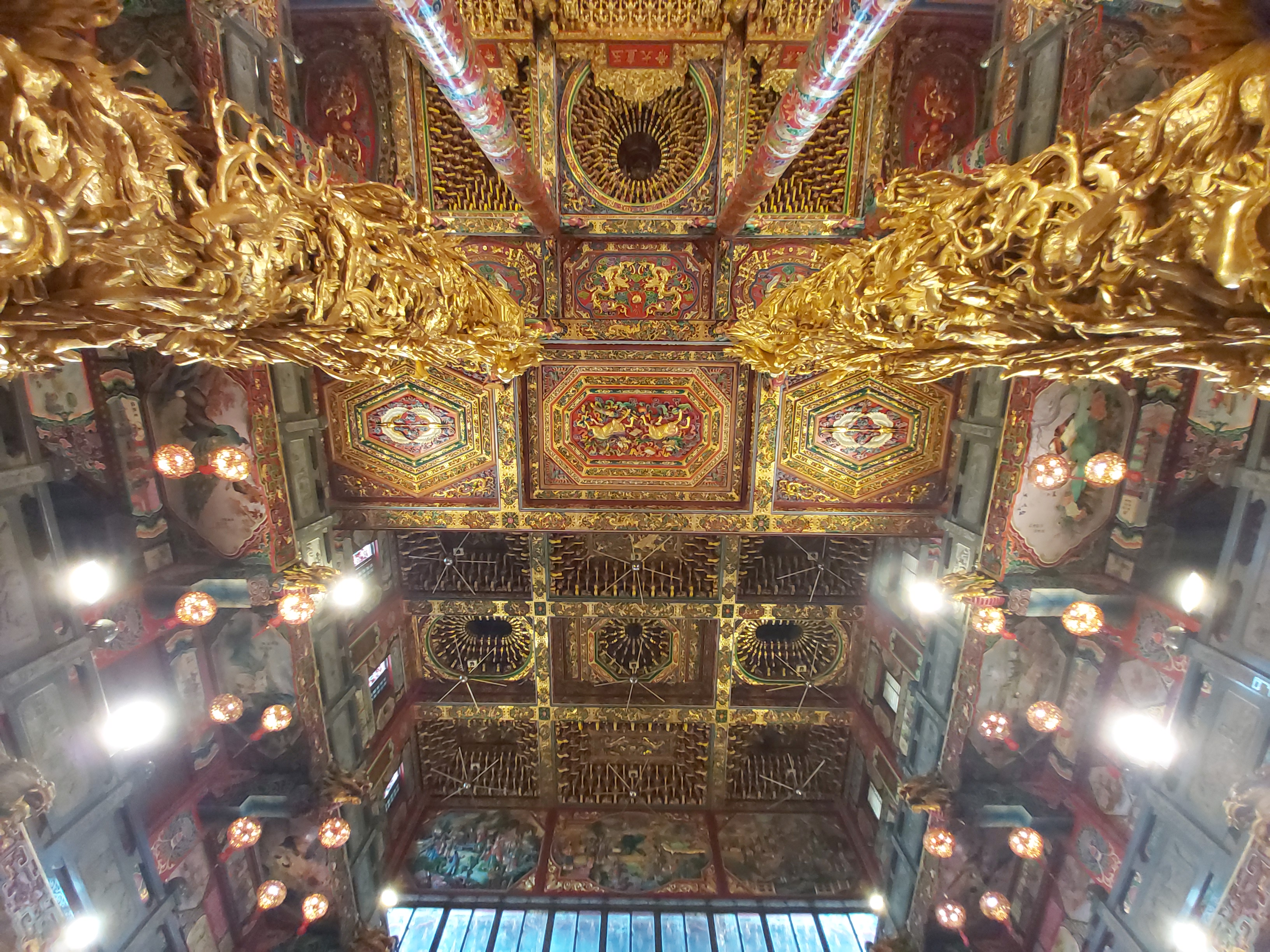
Dayuan Renshou Temple (Ceiling)

- Hengshan Calligraphy Art Center
- Xihai Flower Garden Zone
- Zhuwei Fish Harbor

== Transportation ==
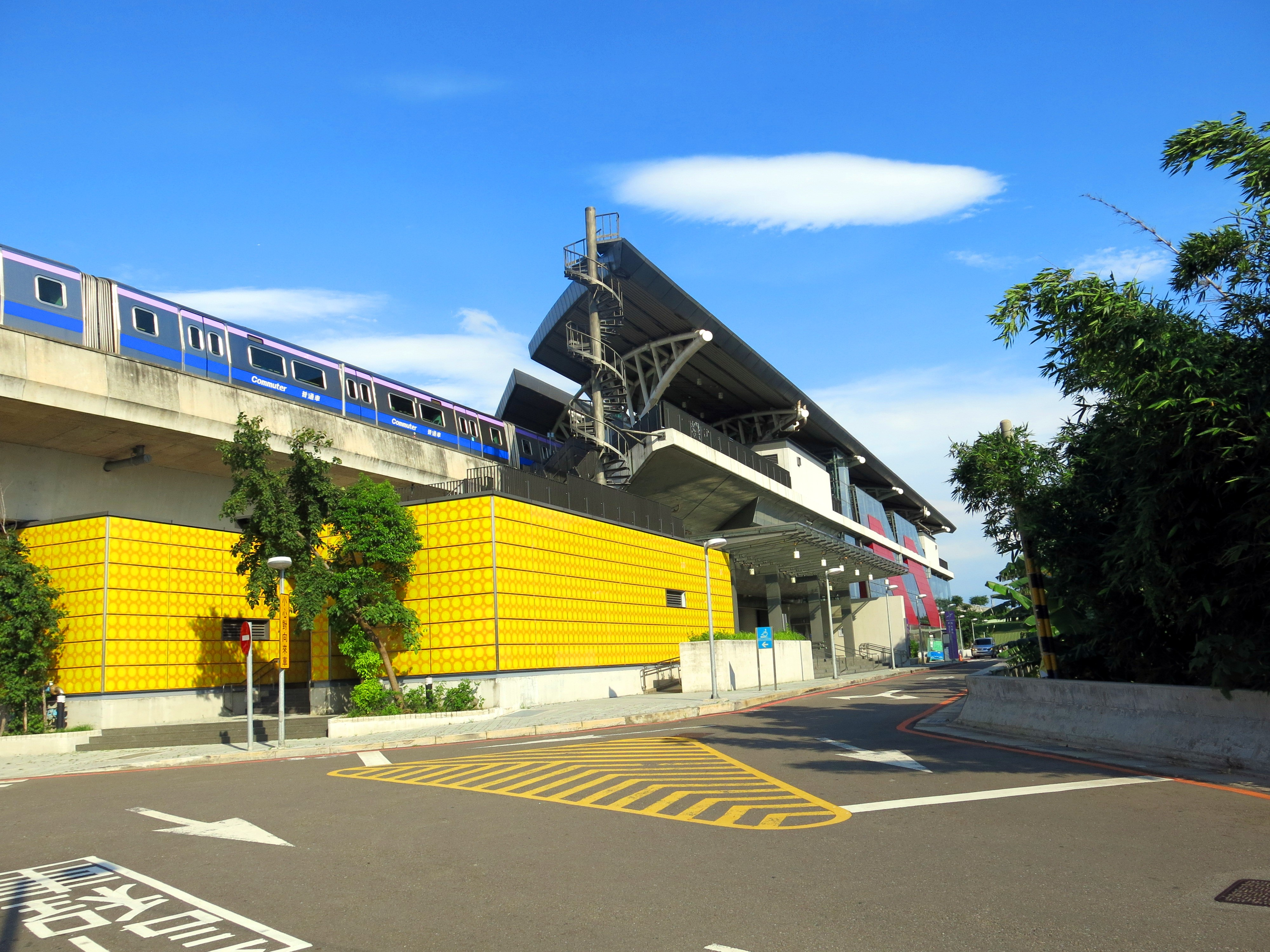
Dayuan Station

=== Air ===
Taiwan Taoyuan International Airport

=== Road ===
The district is served by National Highway No. 2. Bus station in the district is Dayuan Bus Station of Taoyuan Bus.

=== Taoyuan Airport MRT ===
- Airport Terminal 1 Station
- Airport Terminal 2 Station
- Airport Terminal 3 Station (under construction; scheduled for completion in 2025)
- Airport Hotel Station
- Dayuan Station
- Hengshan Station
- Linghang Station

== See also ==
- Taoyuan City
