= List of international schools in Taiwan =

This is a list of the international schools in Taiwan:

== Hsinchu ==
- Hsinchu American School
- Hsinchu International Academy (HIA)
- International Bilingual School at Hsinchu Science Park
- Pacific American School
- Hsinchu International School
- Hsinchu County American School

== Kaohsiung ==
- Dominican International School Kaohsiung
- I-Shou International School
- Kaohsiung American School
- Morrison Academy Kaohsiung

== Nantou County ==
- Taiwan Adventist International School

== New Taipei ==
- Asia American International Academy
- Kang Chiao International School
- Morrison Academy

== Taichung ==
- American School in Taichung
- Ivy Collegiate Academy
- Morrison Academy

== Taipei City ==
- Dominican International School
- Taipei Adventist American School
- Taipei American School
- Taipei European School
- Taipei International Christian Academy
- Taipei Japanese School
- The Primacy Collegiate Academy

== Taoyuan ==
- Taoyuan American School
- Ta Hwa International School

== Yilan County ==
- United Education International School

== Yunlin County ==
- Victoria Academy

== See also ==
- Education in Taiwan
- List of international schools
- List of schools in Taiwan
