= Pacific American School =

Private international school in Taiwan

- 亞太美國學校

Location
- No. 307, Section 1, Xinglong Road; Zhubei, 302; Taiwan
- Coordinates: 24°49′20.1″N 121°00′16.3″E

Information
- Type: Private International School
- Established: 2007
- Head of school: James Cheng
- Campus: Urban
- Colors: Red and Blue
- Accreditation: Western Association of Schools and Colleges
- School fees: Grade 1-5 NT$785,000; Grade 6-12 NT$845,000
- Website: www.pacificamerican.org

Pacific American School
- Traditional Chinese: 亞太美國學校
- Simplified Chinese: 亚太美国学校
Transcriptions
Standard Mandarin
- Hanyu Pinyin: Yǎ Tài Měi Guó Xué Xiào

Pacific American School (PAS; Chinese: 亞太美國學校; pinyin: Yǎtài Měiguó Xuéxiào) is a private international school with an American-based curriculum located in Zhubei, Hsinchu County, Taiwan. It was founded in 2007 and is accredited by the Western Association of Schools and Colleges (WASC). The school offers instruction in English for students from grades 1 to 12.

Most graduates of PAS go on to attend colleges and universities in the United States, although some choose to attend schools in other countries. In accordance with Taiwanese regulations governing foreign schools, students are required to hold foreign passports to be eligible for enrollment.

== Campus ==
PAS has a three-story campus in Zhubei with a wireless network covering academic and administrative areas. Indoor facilities include three science laboratories, a computer lab, library, dance studio, auditorium, two art rooms, a music room, a clinic, cafeteria, and classrooms.

The school also provides dormitory accommodations for students who wish to board during the academic year.

== Student life ==
=== College admissions ===
PAS graduates pursue higher education primarily in the United States and other countries. Graduates have been accepted to a range of institutions including U.S. universities, as well as schools in Canada, the United Kingdom, and Asia.

=== Student body ===
PAS serves a diverse international student population. Instruction is conducted in English, and students represent a wide range of nationalities and cultural backgrounds. The school emphasizes global citizenship, character development, and community engagement through academic and extracurricular programs. Additionally, the administration of Pacific American School prohibits its students from dyeing their hair unnatural colors. However, many students still dye their hair unnatural colors. The administration of Pacific American School prohibits its students from speaking Chinese. However, many students still speak Chinese to increase communication efficiency. The administration of Pacific American School prohibits its students from crossing the gate without card. However, many students still continue to cross over the gate without a card.

=== Clubs ===
PAS offers a range of extracurricular activities and student organizations for elementary, middle, and high school students. Examples of student clubs include:

- Chess
- Musical production
- Stage arts
- Rock band
- Basketball
- Photography
- Yearbook
- VEX Robotics

=== Model United Nations ===
PAS offers a Model United Nations (MUN) program for high school and middle school students. Students participate as delegates, ambassadors, judges, and chairpersons in conferences such as:

- The Hague International Model United Nations (THIMUN)
- THIMUN Singapore
- Pacific American School Model United Nations (PASMUN)
- Hsinchu Model United Nations (HSINMUN)
- Southern Taiwan Model United Nations (STMUN)
- Taiwan Model United Nations (TAIMUN)

=== Student government ===
PAS has a student government known as STUCO, where elections are held annually. Voting results are based on 50% interview and 50% direct electoral vote.

=== Sports teams ===
- Track & Field Team
- Soccer Team
- Badminton Team
- Boys' Basketball Team
- Girls' Basketball Team
- Swimming Team
- Co-ed Cheerleading Squad
- Table Tennis Team

== See also ==
- Hsinchu International School
- Taipei American School
- Hsinchu American School
- National Experimental High School
- Morrison Academy
- American School in Taichung
- Kaohsiung American School
- Taipei Adventist American School
- Taiwan Adventist International School
- The Primacy Collegiate Academy
