= Taipei Kuei Shan School =

- 臺北市私立奎山實驗高級中學
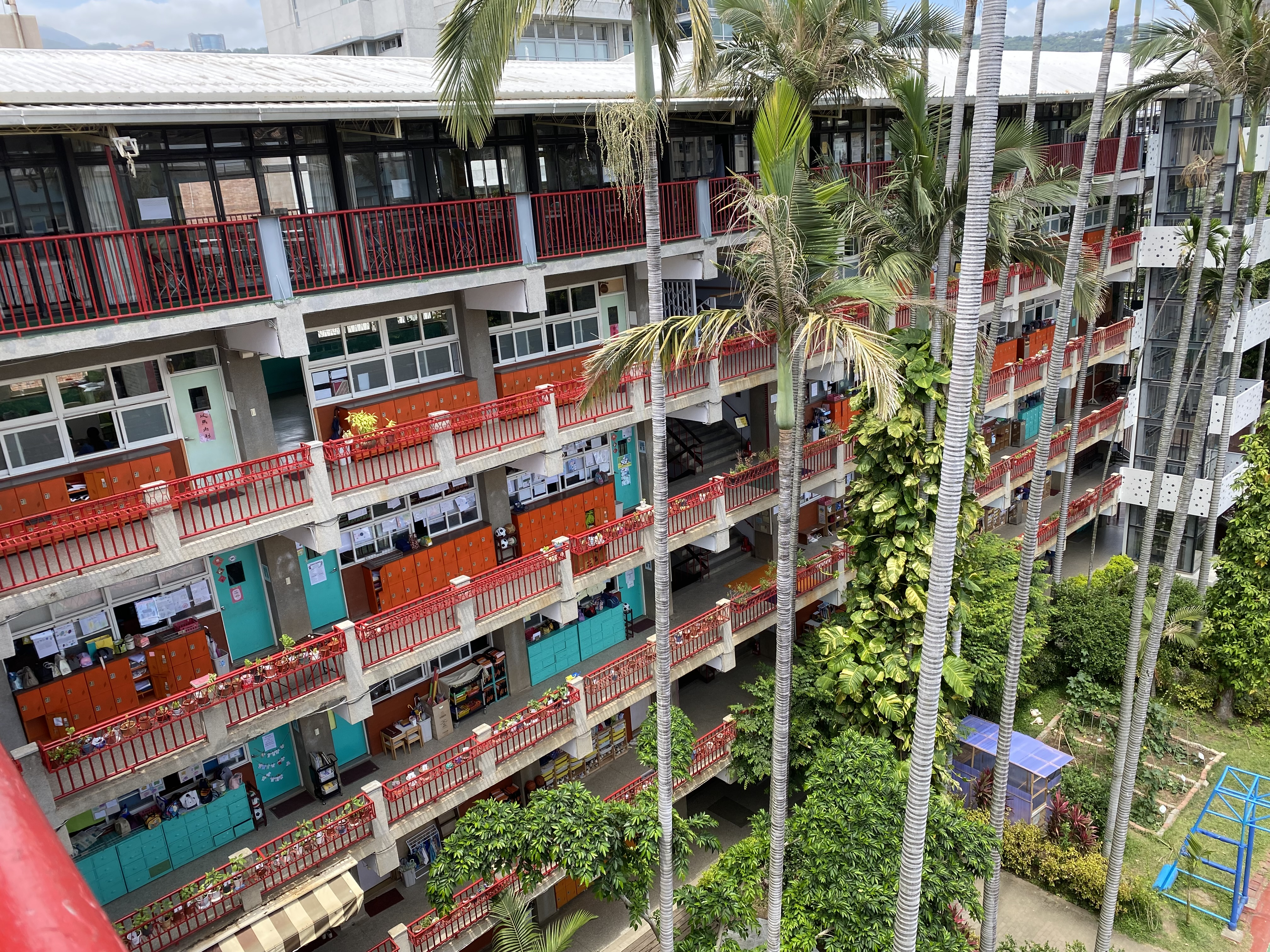

Location
- 200 Mingde Road, Beitou District, Taipei, Taiwan
- Coordinates: 25°6′47″N 121°31′20″E

Information
- Type: Private coeducational Christian school
- Established: 1963
- Head of school: Erick Cheng
- Enrollment: Approximately 700
- Language: English, Chinese
- Accreditation: Taiwanese Ministry of Education, Association of Christian Schools International (ACSI), IB World School
- Tuition: Varies
- Website: www.kshs.tp.edu.tw/

Taipei Kuei Shan School (KSS) is private coeducational Protestant Christian school located in Beitou District, Taipei, Taiwan. The school is fully accredited by the Taipei City Government Department of Education, a member of the Association of Christian Schools International (ACSI) as a private Christian school, and an International Baccalaureate (IB) World School.

== History ==
Established in August 1963 as a small private K-9 school, Taipei Kuei Shan School was founded by Professor Hsiong Hui-Ying and was intended to be an experiment in Taiwan Education.

In 2002, a Chinese-English dual-language immersion programme was launched at the school starting with the 1st and 2nd grades, which aimed to provide a better English literacy curriculum.

Taipei Kuei Shan School was recognised as an IB World School to offer the Diploma Programme on 26 February 2015, the Middle Years Programme on 1 March 2015, and the Primary Years Programme on 1 May 2016.

== Curricular Programme ==
Taipei Kuei Shan School is an IB continuum school authorised by the International Baccalaureate Organisation. The school provides IB Diploma Programme, Middle Years Programme, and Primary Years Programme with a Taiwanese national curriculum perspective. The Pre-K to 12 curriculum is based on IB standards and benchmarks of the Taiwanese Ministry of Education. The school is accredited by the Taipei City Government Department of Education.

== Extracurricular Programme ==
Taipei Kuei Shan School's extracurricular programme includes sports with competitions with members of the Taiwan International School Sports Association (TISSA), as well as local international and Taiwanese schools.

Varsity teams include basketball, volleyball, soccer, track and field, tennis, swimming, ultimate Frisbee, badminton, and cross country.

KSS participates in competitive sports with the following international schools in Taiwan:

- American School Taichung (AST)
- Dominican International School (DIS)
- Grace Christian Academy (GCA)
- Ivy Collegiate Academy (ICA)
- I-Shou International School (IIS)
- Kaohsiung American School (KAS)
- Morrison Academy Taichung (MAT)
- Morrison Academy Kaohsiung (MAK)
- Morrison Academy Taipei (MAT)
- Taipei European School (TES)
- Taipei American School (Non TISSA Member)

Students also participate in the World Scholar's Cup competitions. They represented KSS with success in Shanghai (2010), Kuala Lumpur (2011), Bangkok (2012), and Dubai (2013).

The school's Model United Nations Club has been both attending and hosting conferences for some time. Conferences hosted by Taipei Kuei Shan School are named KSMUN, short for Kuei Shan Model United Nations; the next KSMUN conference is to be held on June 6–8, 2025.

== Controversies ==
On 29 May 2021, when Taiwan was under Level 3 pandemic restrictions due to the COVID-19 pandemic, the KSS Board of Directors violated the regulations of the Taiwanese Ministry of Education on suspending in-person graduation ceremonies and still held the Senior Graduation Ceremony regardless. The Taipei City Government Department of Education stated that a fine of NT$720,000 was imposed, as well as penalties such as reduced classes or suspension of enrollment.

In the following months, Kuei Shan attempted to transition into a legally recognized experimental education institution. However, this application was rejected as the student body of Kuei Shan exceeded that of the limit set by Taiwan's Ministry of Education. In order to combat this issue, Kuei Shan started to advise parents of registered students to withdraw from the school in order to meet the student quota, which resulted in heavy backlash.

In April 2025, Kuei Shan faced criticism from authorities when it mandated the participation of students in winter and summer classes, which contradicted the official guidelines of Taiwan's Ministry of Education which stated that such participation must be voluntary. The Taiwan Youth Democracy Association called on the Taipei City Education Bureau to investigate and impose penalties on the school.
