= List of schools in Taipei =

This is a list of schools in Taipei, Taiwan.

== Public schools ==
- Affiliated Senior High School of National Taiwan Normal University
- Cheng Kung Senior High School
- Taipei First Girls' High School
- Taipei Municipal Chien Kuo High School
- Taipei Municipal Datong High School
- Taipei Municipal Fuxing Senior High School
- Taipei Municipal Lishan Senior High School
- Taipei Municipal Nei-Hu Vocational High School
- Taipei Municipal Song Shan Senior High School
- Taipei Municipal Zhong-zheng Senior High School
- Taipei Municipal Zhongshan Girls High School
- Tsz-Shiou Senior High School
- Yanping High School

== Private schools ==
- Blessed Imelda's School
- Taipei Kuei Shan School
- Taipei WEGO Private Senior High School

=== International schools ===
- Dominican International School
- Morrison Academy
- The Primacy Collegiate Academy
- Taipei Adventist American School
- Taipei American School
- Taipei European School
- Taipei Japanese School

== See also ==
- List of universities and colleges in Taipei
