= International Bilingual School at Hsinchu Science Park =

Coordinates: 24°46′37.9″N 121°00′59.2″E

International Bilingual School at Hsinchu-Science-Park
- 國立新竹科學園區實驗高級中等學校雙語部
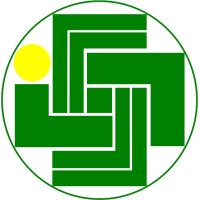

Location
- 300 Jieshou Rd. Hsinchu, Hsinchu County 30078; Taiwan

Information
- Former name: Bilingual Department
- School type: Government-sponsored bilingual school
- Established: December 1983
- Dean: Jess Cheng (鄭維欣主任)
- Principal: Charles Chang Chien (張簡瑞璨校長)
- Teaching staff: 67
- Grades: 1-12
- Enrollment: 542 students
- Classes: 24
- Student to teacher ratio: 20:1
- Website: www.ibsh.tw (in English)

The International Bilingual School at Hsinchu-Science-Park (IBSH; Chinese: 國立新竹科學園區實驗高級中等學校雙語部), formerly known as Bilingual Department of National Experimental High School At Science Based Industrial Park, is near the Hsinchu Science Park. It is part of a public, coeducational school (preprimary-12), National Experimental High School (NEHS). Founded in August 1983, the school was proposed by the founder of the Science Park Kwoh-Ting Li and administered by Ministry of Education, National Science Council and administration of the Park. Originally IBSH was formed to attract high-tech talent and technologies to move to Hsinchu Science park, but the Ministry of Education would not allow the creation of a school based solely for overseas workers. Thus, NEHS was created to satisfy the conditions set by the Ministry of Education. IBSH only admits children of employees of private enterprises in the Park, government organizations, Industrial Technology Research Institute, National Chiao Tung University and National Tsing Hua University.

The Bilingual Department of NEHS changed its name before the 2008–2009 school year after a visit from the Western Association of Schools and Colleges in the spring of 2008. In summer 2011, IBSH was granted WASC accreditation. It attempts to serves students in the English-speaking community who seek an American college-preparatory education or plan to transfer into the local school system.

== Student body ==
The Bilingual Department had at least 700 students from Grades 1-12 enrolled for the 2008–2009 school year. Over half of these students were U.S. citizens. Students come from business, professional, government, and diplomatic families. 41% of IBSH parents have a PhD.

Each grade is split up into two classes, A and B, each with its own homeroom teacher. 39 of the 61 certified full-time teachers have master's degrees and two have PhDs. 38 of the teachers are East Asian, 18 are American, and 5 are Canadian. The faculty-to-student ratio is 1:20.

== Academics ==
Students are put through a challenging curriculum that follows an American high school format, albeit with mandatory Chinese classes. Honor courses offered include Math (9–12), English (9–12), World History (10), and many Advanced Placement courses. AP courses offered at IBSH include Studio Art, Biology, Chemistry, Calculus AB/BC, Chinese Language and Culture, Computer Science, English Literature and Composition, Environmental Science, European History, Micro/Macroeconomics, Physics 1, Physics C, Psychology, Statistics, US History, US Government and Politics, and European History. In May 2008, 195 students took a total of 325 AP tests. 41.5% scored a 5, 18.8% a 4, 16.9% a 3, 8.9% a 2, and 13.8% a 1, with an average score of 3.625.

The class of 2009 had 51 students. Up to September 2008, these students scored an average of 639V, 699M, and 654W (combined average of 1992) on the SAT, well above the U.S. national average. Six members of the class of 2018 have been named Finalists in the National Merit Scholarship Program.

== Extracurriculars ==
Clubs include A Cappella, Student Government (BDSC), Circuit Breaking Crew (breakdancing), ShutterLensLight (photography), D.Co (Dance Company), Debate, Drama Club, Fellowship, Humane Society, GIN, Key Club, InterAct, Panthers Newspaper Club, CinemaScope (film club), and Yearbook. Many students are involved with Model United Nations, and the school hosts Taiwan's only THIMUN affiliated conference HSINMUN. Students also attend TAIMUN, PASMUN, TASMUN, HIMUN, NEMUN, STMUN, and THIMUN-Singapore conferences.

There are athletic teams grade 7-12 students may join. These teams play year-round and hold practices after school. Current teams include Badminton Team, Basketball team (Boys/Girls), Boys soccer team, the NEHS Cheerleading squad (co-ed), and, most importantly, the NEHS Soccer Team. These teams have won games and tournaments at the city and county level.

IBSH holds a rivalry with the Junior High and Senior High Departments of NEHS, especially during Field Day, an all-school track and field competition held in early November.

Students host dances, concerts, and other events such as the back-to-school event (co-hosted by BDSC, InterAct, and Key Club), Beat Concert (co-hosted by InterAct and EDSC), the casual dance (hosted by BDSC), Charity Night (co-hosted by Key Club and InterAct), the semi-formal dance (hosted by BDSC), Prom (hosted by the junior class), TEDxYouth@IBSH, GLO Night: Club Central (hosted by the Global Leadership Organization), and Unplugged (hosted by Key Club).

== See also ==
- National Experimental High School
- Hsinchu American School
- Taipei American School
- Dominican International School
- Morrison Academy
- Kaohsiung American School
- American School in Taichung
- Pacific American School
- Hsinchu Science Park
