= National Experimental High School =

National Experimental High School At Hsinchu Science Park
- 國立新竹科學園區實驗高級中等學校

Location
- No.300, Chieh-Shou Rd., Hsinchu, Taiwan
- 24°46′38.01″N 121°1′2.56″E

Information
- School type: National High School, Elementary School, Kindergarten
- Motto: 誠懇、踏實、創新、超越 (Sincere, Steadfast, Innovative, Transcending)
- Established: 1983
- Principal: Roger Lee
- Website: (in Chinese)

National Experimental High School At Hsinchu Science Park (NEHS; Chinese: 國立新竹科學園區實驗高級中等學校), situated near the Hsinchu Science Park in Taiwan, is a public, coeducational school (pre-primary-12). Founded in August 1983, the school was proposed by the founder of the Science Park Kwoh-Ting Li. NEHS is administered by the Ministry of Education, National Science Council and the Science Park Administration. With the exception of the rigorous "Advanced Math and Science Class" of the Senior High School department, NEHS only admits children of employees of private enterprises in the Science Park, government organizations, the Industrial Technology Research Institute, National Yang Ming Chiao Tung University, and National Tsing Hua University. In 2009, the school adjusted qualification and number of enrollment in response to the national decline of birth rate and the Great Recession, which impacted the employment status of parents working in the Science Park.

International Bilingual School at Hsinchu Science Park (IBSH), formerly known as the Bilingual Department, is affiliated with NEHS and provides a rigorous American-style curriculum supplemented with a mandatory Mandarin Chinese language program in addition to other national education requirements dictated by the Taiwanese government. IBSH is located on the same campus as NEHS.

== Location ==
The school is in a residential district of "Phase I" of Hsinchu Science Park, on its eastern border with "Phase III." The school is about 5 km southeast from Hsinchu Station, the center of downtown Hsinchu City. The school is close to the Hsinchu city's eastern border with Zhudong, Hsinchu county. It is built on a westward slope.

Lake Placid (also called "Artificial Lake", a pond built by the Science Park) is in the northwest of the school, next to its field and track ground. In the west of the school is the Jinshan Temple, first built by Chinese settlers in 1853, renovated in 1889, preserved as a class three historic site in 1986, and renovated in 1991. The temple is the center of a broader historic region called "Jinshan Mian" including today's Science Park.

Jinshan Mian (Chinese: 金山面; pinyin: Jinshanmian, also written as "Kin-San-Mian") was named and developed by Hakka and Hokkien settler organization in the late 18th century. Before the development, this region was a mountainous buffer between Chinese immigrant territory in the west and aboriginal territory in the east.

Further west is the residential district of the Science Park, where many students live.

In the southwest and the south is the industrial district of the Science Park, where many parents of the students work.

In the east of the school, before its main entrance and across Jieshou Road, is the "Jinshan Road area". This is a grid-planned area with Jinshan Road as its main street. It is a residential and commercial district developed by the Science Park in the late 1990s to accommodate houses relocated by "Phase III" development of the park. There are many restaurants in this area.

In the north of the school (along the Jieshou Road) is Guandong Police Station. Further north is the World Senior High School. Further north is the northern end of Jieshou Road (Chinese: 介壽; pinyin: Jieshou; Wade–Giles: Chieh-shou) which connects to Guangfu Road (光復; Guangfu; Kuang-fu), a main east-west artery of Hsinchu City. This section of Guangfu Road is known as "Guandong Bridge" (關東橋; Guandong qiao), which is also a commercial district thriving on the Science Park. There are stations of Hsinchu City Bus and many students take buses from here to go west to the downtown or go east to Hsinchu county.

== History ==
On March 23, 1982, Kwoh-Ting Li, the then Minister of the Executive Yuan, chaired a special meeting, during which the proposal of establishing National Experimental High School at the Science-based Industrial Park was formally approved by representatives from the Ministry of Education, National Science Council, academic and research institutions, and as well as universities in the neighborhood of the Science Park.

Later, in August 1983, National Experimental High School at the Science-based Industrial Park was formally founded. The first enrollments included one senior high class, three junior high classes, and three bilingual classes with one kindergarten class.

== See also ==
- International Bilingual School at Hsinchu Science Park
- Hsinchu American School
- Taipei American School
- Dominican International School
- Morrison Academy
- Kaohsiung American School
- American School in Taichung
- Pacific American School
- Hsinchu Science Park
