= National Nanke International Experimental High School =

Public co-educational school in Sinshih District, Tainan, Taiwan

Coordinates: 23°06′25.08″N 120°17′31.33″E

- 國立南科國際實驗高級中學
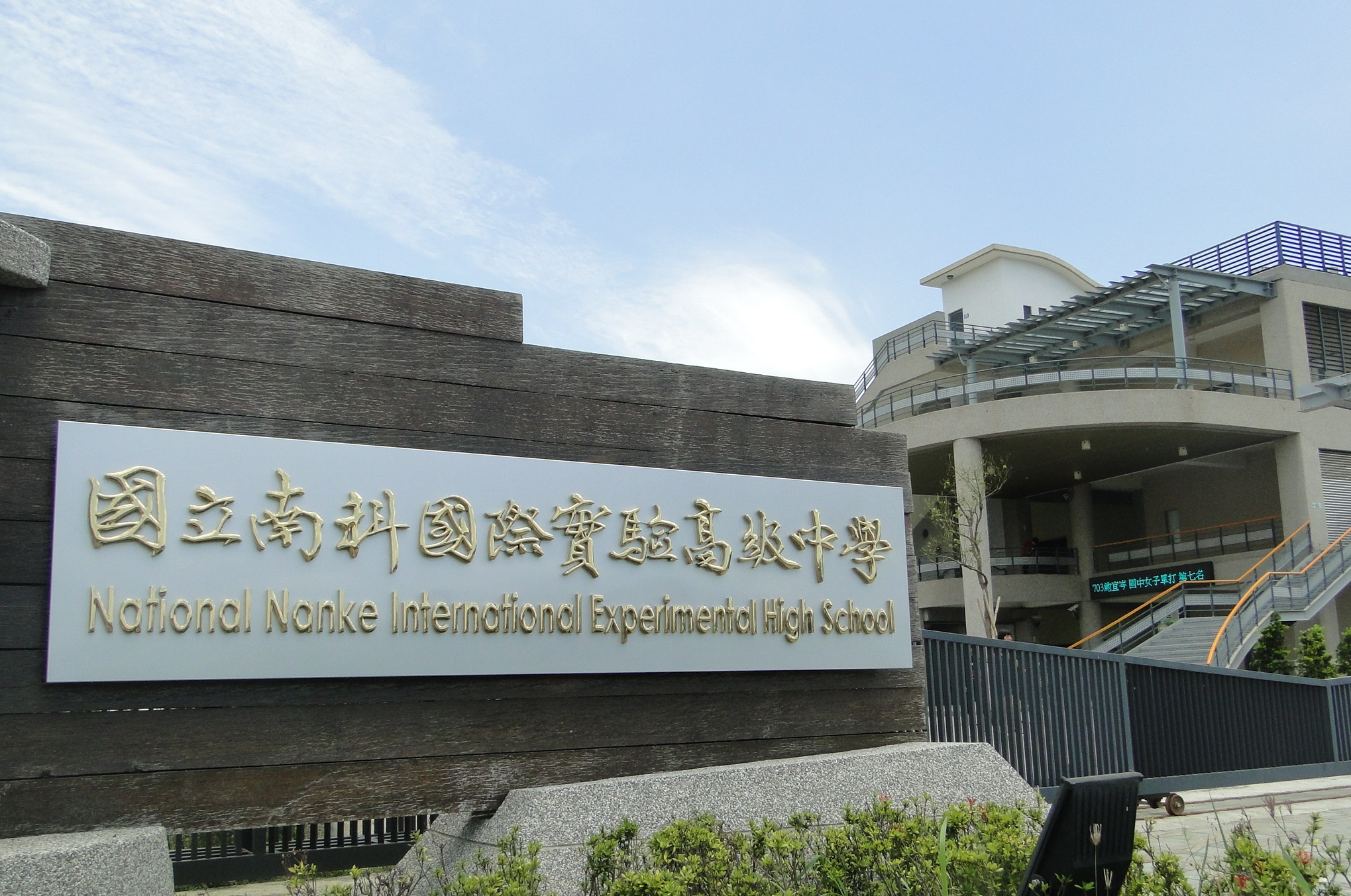

Location
- No.6, Lane 12, Dashun 6th Road, Sanshe Borough; Sinshih District, Tainan, Taiwan

Information
- School type: National High School, Elementary School
- Established: 2006
- Principal: CAI, MING-HUEI
- Website: National Nanke International Experimental High School

National Nanke International Experimental High School (NNKIEH; Chinese: 國立南科國際實驗高級中學; pinyin: Guólì Nánkē Huójì Shíyàn Gāojí Zhōngxué), situated in the Southern Taiwan Science Park (STSP), is a public, co-educational school serving Grades 1 -12. NNKIEH was founded in 2006 in order to ensure a good academic environment for the children of both local Science Park employees as well as foreign high-tech professionals. The school is multi-cultural. Three of the departments are for local Chinese students and adopt the Taiwanese (R.O.C.) national curriculum, while the Bilingual Department serves students in the English-speaking community who seek an American college-preparatory education.

== History ==
Key milestones in the development of NNKIEH

- Executive Yuan meeting declared the establishment of the STSP in the Economic Revitalization Project, 1993.
- Detailed Plan of STSP approved by the Ministry of the Interior, 1997
- NanKe Elementary School opens to 120 2nd graders, September, 2002
- NanKe Elementary School bilingual class opens to 5 1st graders, September, 2003
- NanKe Junior High School opens to 160 7th graders, September, 2002
- NanKe Junior High School bilingual class opens to 10 7th graders, September, 2003
- STSP unveils NNKIEH founding projects and high school design principle, Spring 2005
- Ministry of Education approves high school projects, Spring 2006
- Interim Office is set up and NNKIEH founding project is launched, April 2006
- Dr. Hsu-Chang Tai is hired as Founding Principal, July 2006
- NanKe Elementary School and NanKe Junior High School joins NNKIEH, August 2006.
- NNKIEH Bilingual Department is renamed as International Bilingual School at Southern Taiwan Science Park (IBST), November 2011

== Departments ==
The school is composed of four departments: three departments using the R.O.C. curriculum (elementary, junior high and senior high school) and one bilingual department using American college-preparatory courses. School enrollment totals 2174 students.

The three regular departments facilitate a local Mandarin education and adopt the Taiwan (ROC) national curriculum. NNKIEH is accredited by the R.O.C. Ministry of Education and is administered by both the R.O.C. Ministry of Education and the National Science Council. The Bilingual Department is operated as a magnet program.

== The Bilingual Department ==
The Bilingual Department comprises 93 students from 13 nationalities. The senior class of 2009 comprises three students who will be the first graduates of the NNKIEH Bilingual Department. Bilingual Department parents are employed in tertiary education, the business sector as well as the fields of science and medicine. Eighty-three percent of the Bilingual Department parents have advanced degrees.

The Bilingual Department faculty is composed of twenty certified, full-time teachers. 70% of faculty have master's degrees. Thirteen teachers are Chinese of whom 83% graduated from English-speaking Western universities. Seven teachers are foreign nationals hailing from the US, Canada, UK, Ireland and South Africa. The student-teacher ratio is 6:1.

Bilingual Department students face demanding instructors and a fully bilingual (English and Mandarin) curriculum. NNKIEH operates on a semester system with a 200-day school year, beginning in late August and dismissing in late June. In addition to the US college-preparatory courses, all students are required to study Chinese, which is taught by native speakers. The intensive, total immersion Chinese program (Levels 1–12) takes students from their entry levels to the highest levels they can attain during the duration of their studies.

The Senior Class of 2009 has also had the opportunity to take the following courses as electives: Drama, Psychology, Spanish I, Spanish II, Art, Politics, AP Economics, AP Statistics and AP Literature and Composition.

The educational experience at NNKIEH is enhanced by its after school program. This year Bilingual Department students have the following co-curricular activities to choose from: Arts: Orchestra, Dancing, Guitar, Chinese Calligraphy. Recreational Clubs: Tech Club. Sports Clubs: Martial Arts, Table Tennis, Tennis, Badminton, Volleyball, Soccer, Futsal. Academic Clubs: Chemistry, Biology, Model United Nations, Debate.

Update: As part of the accreditation process for WASC (Western association OF Schools and Colleges) the Bilingual Department has been renamed the International Bilingual School at Tainan Science Park.(See link below)

== See also ==
- Kaohsiung American School
- Morrison Academy
- American School in Taichung
- Taipei American School
- National Experimental High School
