= Hsinchu American School =

Coordinates: 24.7682°N 120.9659°E

- 新竹美國學校
- No.707, Sec. 2 Wufu Road Xiangshan Dist., Hsinchu City 300110; Taiwan

Information
- Type: Private International School
- Established: 2005
- Colors: Blue, Yellow, and White
- Mascot: Wolf
- Tuition: Grade 1 - 5 NT$175,000; Grade 6 - 8 NT$185,0000; Grade 9 - 12 NT$195,0000
- Website: www.has.hc.edu.tw

Hsinchu American School
- Traditional Chinese: 新竹美國學校
Transcriptions
Standard Mandarin
- Hanyu Pinyin: Xīnzhú Měiguó Xuéxiào
- Wade–Giles: Hsin¹-chu² Mei³-kuo² Hsüeh²-hsiao⁴

Hsinchu American School (HAS; Chinese: 新竹美國學校) is private, international school with a largely based American curriculum located in East District, Hsinchu City, Taiwan. It was founded in 2004 by Glory Yeh, a Taiwanese real estate developer.

HAS offers instruction in English for students grades 1-12. It is recognized by American Institute in Taiwan and the Taiwan Ministry of Education.

== History ==
The Hsinchu American School began operations in 2005. HAS used to be on the top level of a four-story open-center structure shared with Sagor Bilingual School. HAS moved to its own facility in 2017 and now operates on its own campus, which includes sporting facilities. HAS moved to Building F at Chung Hua University in June 2023.

== Campus ==
HAS is located within the campus of Chung Hua University and offers a range of facilities, including:

- Basketball Courts
- Weight Room
- Dance Studio
- Science Lab
- Robotics Lab
- Art Room
- Library
- Cafeteria
- Student Store

HAS shares access to various facilities at Chung Hua University, including an indoor gym, swimming pool, track and field, and auditorium.

== Student body ==
HAS currently has enrollment open for grades 1-12. HAS abides by Taiwan Foreign Schools Law, which requires all international schools to only admit students who hold non-Taiwan passports.

== See also ==
- Taipei American School
- National Experimental High School
- Morrison Academy
- American School in Taichung
- Kaohsiung American School
- Hsinchu International School
- Taipei Adventist American School
- Taiwan Adventist International School
- The Primacy Collegiate Academy
