= Taipei European School =

Location
- Primary campus 99 Fuguo Road, Shilin District; Taipei 11158 Secondary campus 31 Jianye Road, Shilin District; Taipei 11193; 25.101786°N 121.520084°E 25.136607°N 121.549218°E

Information
- Type: Private International School
- Established: 1990
- Chief Executive Officer: David Mansfield (in effect August 2026)
- Staff: 378
- Houses: Bora, Marin, Mistral and Sirocco
- Website: www.tes.tp.edu.tw

Taipei European School
- Traditional Chinese: 臺北歐洲學校
- Simplified Chinese: 台北欧洲学校
Transcriptions
Standard Mandarin
- Hanyu Pinyin: Táiběi Ōuzhōu Xuéxiào
- Wade–Giles: T'ai-pei Ou-chou Hsüeh-hsiao

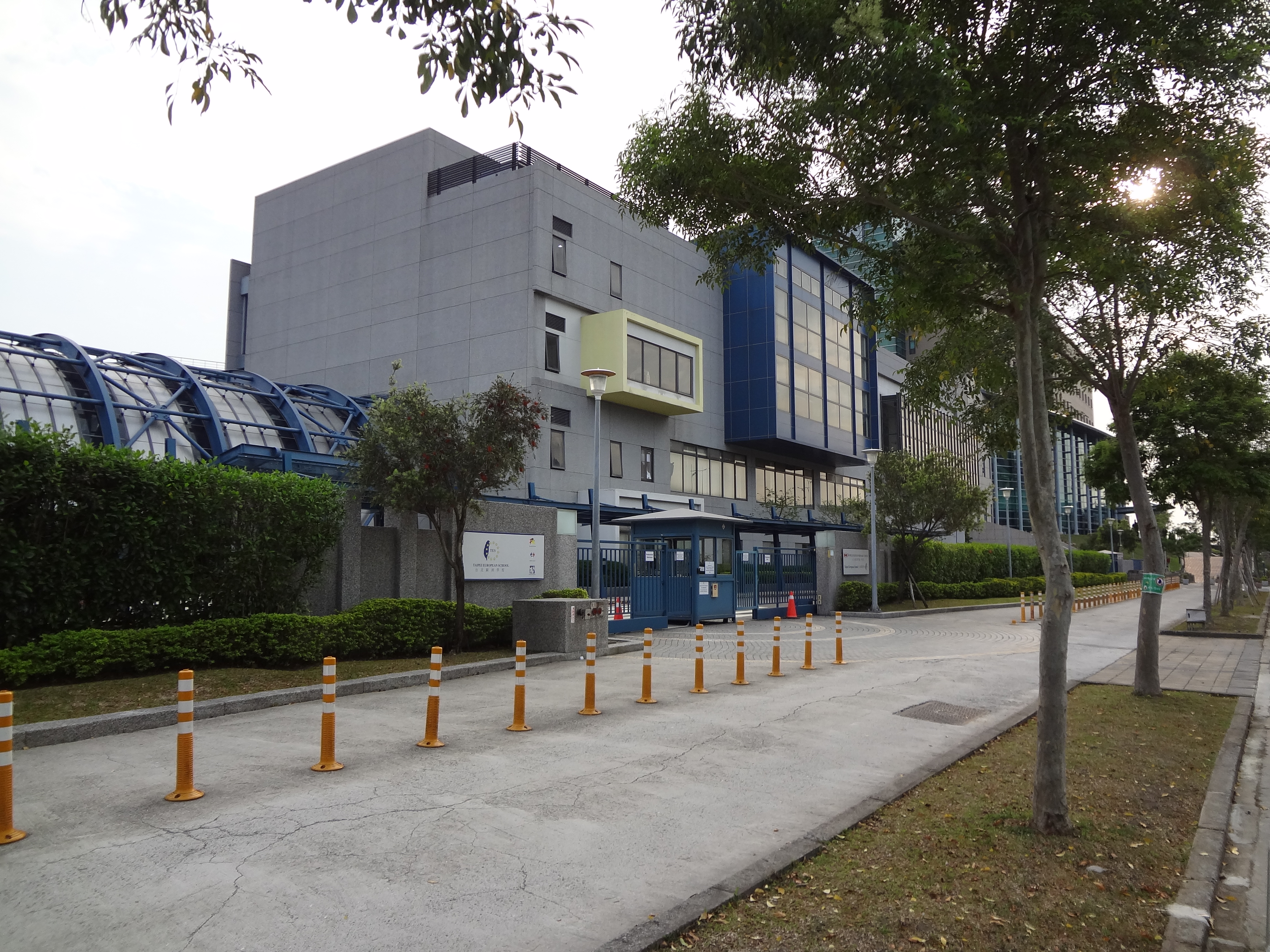
Swire European Primary Campus

The Taipei European School (Chinese: 臺北歐洲學校; pinyin: Táiběi Ōuzhōu Xuéxiào) is a European international school in the Shilin District of Taipei, Taiwan. It includes a British section, a German section, and a French section.

Taipei European School (TES) is registered as a legal entity in the form of a nonprofit foundation supervised by the Department of Education within the Taipei City Government.

TES integrates its German, British, and French sections in terms of their curricula, administration, finance, buildings and facilities. The Taipei British School (TBS), École Française de Taipei (EFT) and Deutsche Schule Taipei (DST) were established around 1990 to serve expatriate families with young children living in Taipei. Shortly afterwards, the schools joined together to establish a combined European campus, in which the schools share facilities and resources but teach their respective national curricula.

The school has an enrollment of more than 1800 students from around 57 countries. TES is authorized by the International Baccalaureate Organization to run the Diploma and Middle Years program, and is classed as an IB World School. TES is also a member of the Federation of British International Schools in Asia (FOBISIA) and affiliated to Agence pour l'Enseignement Français à l'Étranger (AEFE) and Bundesverwaltungsamt-Zentralstelle für das Auslandsschulwesen (BVA-ZfA).

== Campuses ==
Campuses in Taipei

The Taipei European School operates on two campuses: Swire European Primary Campus (EPC) at Wenlin Road and Swire European Secondary Campus (ESC) at JianYe Road on Yang Ming Shan.

=== Swire European Primary Campus – Fuguo Road (福國路） ===
Swire European Primary Campus was completed in 2007 and consists of three buildings: the Central Resource Area (CRA), the Infant Building and the Junior Building. The Central Resource Area is a four-story building which houses common facilities such as the cafeteria, the library, a multi-purpose room, the Parents' Café, administrative offices, the uniform shop, a maintenance room and an underground car park. It is connected both to the Infant Building and to the Junior Building.

The two-story Infant Building contains general classrooms for students aged 3 to 7 years old from the German, British and French Sections, as well as shared specialist facilities. A multi-purpose room, an outdoor playground with play structures, as well as grassed and astroturfed areas, are also located in the Infant Wing.

The five-story Junior Building houses general classrooms for students aged 7 to 11 years old from the German, British and French Sections, and includes shared specialist teaching facilities. There is an outdoor play area as well as two astroturf sport fields.

=== Swire European Secondary Campus – Yang Ming Shan (陽明山) ===
There are three buildings in the secondary campus which are referred to as Phase 1, Phase 2 and Phase 3. The construction of Phase 1 was completed in 1998, the construction of Phase 2 in 2002 and the construction of Phase 3 in late 2019. All three buildings are four floors high.

The Phase I building contains specialists rooms including a music suite, a library, two computer labs, a multi-media room, three science labs, a fine art and 3D art room, a drama and performance area, an outdoor basketball hoop, a cafeteria, and an atrium.

The Phase II building contains physics and chemistry labs, a library, a cafeteria, three computer labs, four science labs, two art rooms, an amphitheatre (under construction), two basketball courts, and a large atrium,

The Phase III building has 30 large classrooms, 2 gymnasiums, a fitness room, a dance studio and an outdoor basketball court.

== Student body ==
Currently, Taipei European School has around 1,800 students, with British section students as the majority.

Students originate largely from Europe and North America, with British, French, German, American, and Canadian as the dominating nationalities. There are also students from Latin America, Africa, Singapore, Japan, and Korea. The school has students and faculty from over 50 different countries.

Students follow these five values at school; Respect, Participation, Creativity, Perseverance, and Responsibility.

There are four headteachers running the four sections, under the supervision of the TES CEO David Mansfield. The primary section, for students aged between 3 and 11, is located in the Wenlin Campus, and currently enrolls 1078 students.

The British Secondary Section (Key Stage Three) is located in the Yang Ming Shan campus. It consists of students between 11 and 14 years old, following the UK national curriculum. Students study subjects including mathematics, science, English, two foreign languages (options for French, German, Spanish plus Chinese which becomes optional at Highschool), physical education, geography, ICT, history, drama, art, and music.

The High School Section is for students from H1 to H4 (equivalent to grades 9-12 in the American system). It offers the International General Certificate of Secondary Education (IGCSE) program for the H1-H2s, the international equivalent of the British GCSE examinations. The school uses the Cambridge International Examinations (CIE), the exam board offered by University of Cambridge Local Examinations Syndicate (UCLES).

The IB Diploma Program is offered to most students in TES after the completion of IGCSE. For those who do not meet the requirements for IB, TES students can also take a TES diploma.

Starting from August 2022, the IB Middle Years Programme has started with new Year 7s and will slowly replace the original curriculum for the British Secondary Section (Key Stage Three) and the International General Certificate of Secondary Education (IGCSE) program for H1-H2s.

== Sports ==
TES students compete in the U13 and U15 FOBISIA, an annual international interscholastic sporting tournament between British international schools in Asia. TES hosted the U13 FOBISIA teams in March 2015.

TES offers sports such as football, rugby, basketball, softball, volleyball, athletics and swimming.

In the High School section, students mainly take part in football, basketball, and volleyball, competing in tournaments hosted at Morrison Academy and the Taipei American School, with its soccer program also including an overseas tournament for U18 women and men in Phuket, Thailand, against other international schools.

Within the school, the students are involved in the annual intramural House Cup, in four Houses: Bora, Sirocco, Mistral, and Marin.

== See also ==
- Taipei Japanese School
- Kaohsiung American School
- American School in Taichung
- Hsinchu American School
- Taipei Adventist American School
- Taiwan Adventist International School
- The Primacy Collegiate Academy
