= Nanke =

Nanke may refer to:

- Southern Taiwan Science Park, often abbreviated 南科 (pinyin: Nánkē)
  - National Nanke International Experimental High School, located in the park
  - Nanke railway station, located near the Tainan part of the Science Park
- Nanke, a cadet branch of the Japanese Fujiwara family
- A place in the Chinese folktale The Governor of Nanke
