= Dominican International School =

School in Taipei City, Taiwan

- Chinese: 私立道明外僑學校
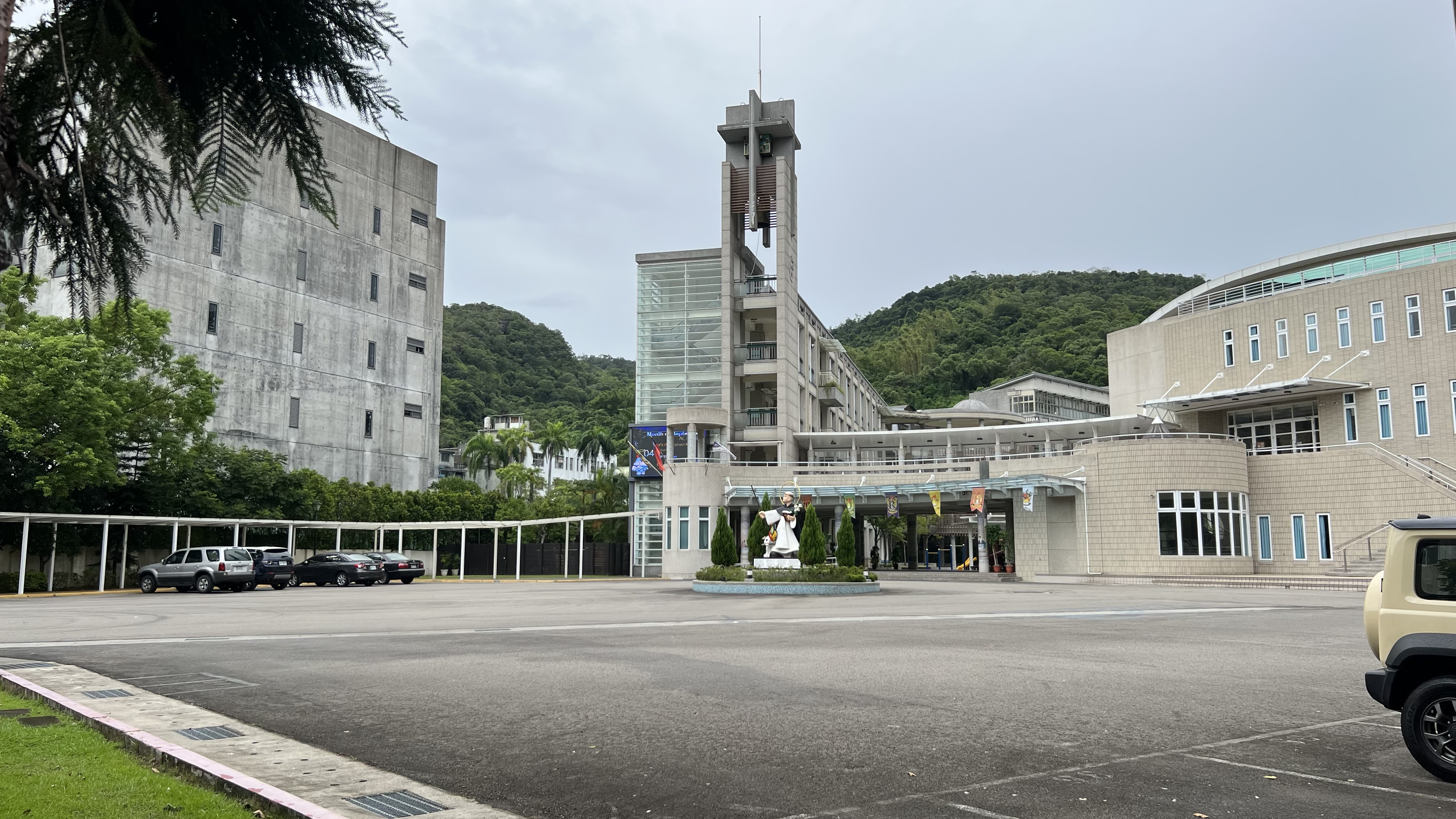

Location
- 76 Dazhi St., Zhongshan District; Taipei City; Taiwan; 25.08507°N 121.54643°E

Information
- Type: Private international school Catholic School
- Motto: Latin: Laudare, Praedicare, Benedicere
- Religious affiliation: Catholicism
- Denomination: Order of Preachers
- Established: 1967; 59 years ago
- Principal: Jacqueline C. Manuel
- Athletics conference: TISSA
- Mascot: Wolves
- Yearbook: The Dominican
- Website: www.dishs.tp.edu.tw

Dominican International School (Chinese: 私立道明外僑學校), formerly Dominican School, is a private Catholic international school, located in Dazhi, Zhongshan District, Taipei City, Taiwan. The Sisters of the Congregation of the Religious Missionaries of St. Dominic own and manage the school.

The school is open to all foreign students. Dominican International School educates students from Kindergarten to Grade 12, including Advanced Placement.

== History ==
=== Founding ===
In the latter part of 1956, permission from the Mother General of the Sisters was obtained to start a school that offered Catholic instruction to American dependents. The first school was organized for Pre-Kindergarten, Kindergarten and Grades 1 and 2 at a small rented house on Chang'an East Road.

In January 1957, the school was blessed by Anthony Riberi, D.D., Apostolic Internuncio, to China. Three Filipino Sisters started to teach the 16 enrolled children. Enrollment increased, and by June 1957, there were 76 students, and two additional Filipino Sisters had joined the faculty.

In the following school year, a larger house was rented on Liung Chung Street. In August 1958, a team of American Superintendents of Schools from Washington D.C. arrived. They examined the school and designated Dominican School as a U.S. Government contract school: a D.O.D. school. Grade 3 was added to the existing grades.

In 1959, a larger building was rented. Three more grades were added and more Sisters arrived from the Philippines. The first PTA was organized with volunteer officers. A vacant site was purchased for the erection of school buildings, including strips of land for granting access to the property. This remains the location of Dominican International School. Before materials could be brought in for the construction of the building, the access roads had to be completed.

The first cornerstone was blessed in a ceremony by a Dominican priest on August 4, 1959, after which construction started. On March 28, 1960, classes were held for the first time in the new school. On April 30, 1960, Thomas Cardinal Tien, S.V.D., D.D, blessed the school. Grades 7 and 8 were added in the following year. More Sineps came from the Philippines and the enrollment reached 600.

As time went by, a gymnasium was added, statues erected and a wall placed around the compound. In August 1960, 4 classrooms, a laboratory, a science room, a typing room and a music room were added to the existing school building. For the first time, there were Grade 9 classes and the enrollment reached 800. With the withdrawal of the American Forces from Taipei, Dominican School became an international school.

=== Religion at DIS ===
The school encourages students to participate in prayers, religious celebrations, and activities that reflect Catholic beliefs. Supporters argue that these practices help students develop strong moral values, compassion, discipline, and a sense of community. They believe that faith provides an ethical foundation that benefits students both academically and personally.

However, some critics argue that a strong emphasis on religion can make students feel pressured to conform, particularly if they come from different religious backgrounds or do not share the same beliefs. They suggest that schools should ensure students feel comfortable expressing their own views and that participation in religious activities respects individual choice.

It is also important to recognize that attending a faith-based school is generally a decision made by students and their families with the expectation that religion will be an important part of school life. Many parents intentionally choose Dominican International School because they value a Catholic education and want their children to grow in that environment.

=== Twenty-first century ===
2006 was spent developing an electronic curriculum. This new system made the curriculum available online to all stakeholders. The initial stages of the development process were completed in time for the school's 50th Year Celebrations in 2007.

In December 2008, the gymnasium, cafeteria, and the west wing of the main building were demolished to make way for the construction of new school buildings more suitable for modern education and technology. The groundbreaking ceremony for the new construction was held in June 2009, blessed by Archbishop John Hung, S.V.D. and construction started in August 2010.

Phase One, which included classrooms, an audio-visual room, an art room, science laboratories, and a brand new library were completed in the summer of 2013. The remaining buildings will be demolished and rebuilt in 2014 and 2015.

== Academics ==
The modified American curriculum includes courses in Religious Studies.

In 2017 the school received accreditation from the United States.

== Athletics ==
Upper School sports teams and groups, whose mascot is the Wolves, compete with members of the Taiwan International School Sports Association (TISSA), as well as local international and Taiwanese schools.

Varsity teams include basketball, volleyball, soccer, track and field, tennis, swimming, ultimate Frisbee, badminton, and cross country.

DIS participates in competitive sports with the following international schools in Taiwan:

- American School Taichung (AST)
- Grace Christian Academy (GCA)
- Ivy Collegiate Academy (ICA)
- I-Shou International School (IIS)
- Kaohsiung American School (KAS)
- Taipei Kuei Shan School (KSS)
- Morrison Academy Taichung (MAT)
- Morrison Academy Kaohsiung (MAK)
- Morrison Academy Taipei (MAT)
- Taipei European School (TES)
- Taipei American School (Non TISSA Member)

== Notable alumni ==
- Peter Ho (何潤東) actor
- Gregorio Honasan
- Will Pan (潘瑋柏) pop singer
- Vanness Wu (吳建豪) F4, singer, actor
- Norodom Arunrasmy
- Rhydian Vaughan (鳳小岳) actor
