= TICA =

TICA may refer to:

- Taipei International Christian Academy, a school in Taipei, Taiwan
- The International Cat Association, a US-based but multinational pedigree registry for cats
- Tisa River (Putna Întunecoasă), also known as the Tica River
- Temporal independent component analysis (tICA)
- The feminine form of Tico, slang for a native of Costa Rica
