= Vuylsteke =

Vuylsteke is a surname. Notable people with the surname include:

- Julius Vuylsteke (1836–1903), Belgian politician and writer
- Richard Vuylsteke, American diplomat
