= Aimee Sun =

Taiwanese entrepreneur (born 1978)

Aimee Sun 孫芸芸
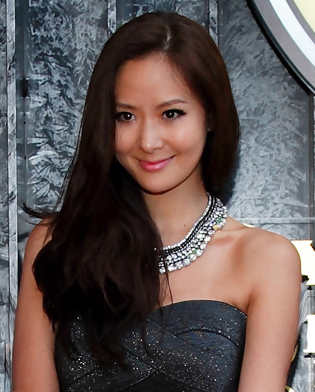
- Born: 14 May 1978 (age 47); Taipei, Taiwan
- Other names: Sūn Yúnyún (孫芸芸); Sun Yun Yun
- Occupation: Entrepreneur

Chinese name
- Traditional Chinese: 孫芸芸
- Simplified Chinese: 孙芸芸
Transcriptions
Standard Mandarin
- Hanyu Pinyin: Sūn Yúnyún

Aimee Sun or Sun Yun-yun (Chinese: 孫芸芸; pinyin: Sūn Yúnyún; born 14 May 1978) is a Taiwanese socialite and businesswoman. She is a popular commercial model in Taiwan for her glamorous image.

Her father was Sun Tao-tsun (孫道存), co-founder of Taiwan Mobile, while her mother is Ho Nien-Tsu (何念慈), the vice-chairwoman of Yuanta Securities. Sun attended Dominican International School and Taipei American School for elementary school, and the University of Southern California. She first met and fell for Henry Liao, the son of businessman Paul Liao, at 13, and married him In June 1999.
