= Andrew Chou =

Andrew Chou 周立銘
- Also known as: 麻吉弟弟, Younger Brother Machi
- Born: Andrew Chou Li-Ming; May 7, 1990 (age 35); Irvine, California, U.S.
- Genres: pop, trap, EDM, dubstep, hip-hop, rock
- Occupation(s): Music Producer, DJ
- Years active: 2003–present
- Labels: Independent
- Spouse: Nicky (m. 2016)
- Website: Official Facebook Page

Andrew Chou Li-Ming (born May 7, 1990), known by his stage name Younger Brother Machi, is an American songwriter, DJ, and music producer.

== 2002 - 06: Career beginnings and Machi ==
In 2004 he released his first solo album entitled "Oh My!". The album was a success, but Andrew's family made the decision to prioritize schooling over his music career, which forced Andrew to return to America to study, cutting short the time he was allowed to promote and perform in Taiwan. Back in America, Andrew was bullied and met with racism at Corona del Mar High School. He resolved to overcome the bullying and become a stronger person.

In 2005, in order to be able to better pursue his music career, he moved to Taiwan, during which he attended Taipei American School. Machi released their third and final album, Superman (超人). Once promotion of the album finished, Andrew went to Beijing, China, for several months to act in a movie, entitled "Slam", directed by Jonathan Lim. The movie won 2008 Worldfest Houston's Gold Award for "Best Film".

== 2015 - Current: Younger Brother Machi is Back ==
In 2017 he was released from his contract with HIM, citing differences in the direction he wanted to take his career, stating that he wanted to perform electronic music instead of pop.

In September 2018, he performed at Ultra Taiwan, was nominated for the GMA's "Best Vocal Recording Album" for Karencici's album, and in 2019, released "My Wave", his first full-length studio album, 16 years since his debut album.

== Discography ==
=== Productions ===
Year	Artist	Title	Role
2003	Machi	"麻吉弟弟"	Composer / Lyricist
2003	麻吉弟弟	"Pi Li Pa La"	Composer
2007	Vanness Wu	"Eternity"	Composer / Arranger
2007	Steven Lin	"請你離開"	Producer
2007	Steven Lin	"離開妳的世界"	Producer
2007	Steven Lin	"情人節愚人節"	Producer
2007	Steven Lin	"尋人啟事"	Producer
2007	Steven Lin	"借住"	Producer
2008	Nicky Lee	"Forever"	Composer
2009	Ding Dang	"突然想愛你"	Composer
2011	樂之路	"我不要自由"	Composer / Arranger
2011	樂之路	"老爺車"	Composer / Arranger
2013	Wanting 曲婉婷	Drenched (YOUNGER BROTHER MACHI Remix)	Remix
2013	MC JV	德瑪西亞特別班 Demacia (YOUNGER BROTHER MACHI Remix)	Remix
2015	Hebe Tien	"念念有詞 (Beautiful Prophecy)"	Arranger / Mixer
2015	詹惟中	"祈福" "誰是醜八怪(ft. Nicky & Agogo)" "別叫我楊偉" "那麼有錢" "感恩(ft. 山豬香蕉)"	Producer
2015	頑Battle	徐太宇 V.S 柯景騰	Producer
2016	S.H.E.	"Genesis" (YOUNGER BROTHER MACHI Remix)	Remix
2016	S.H.E.	"Satisfaction" (YOUNGER BROTHER MACHI Remix)	Remix
2016	S.H.E.	"Blossomy" (YOUNGER BROTHER MACHI Remix)	Remix
2016	S.H.E.	"Superstar" (YOUNGER BROTHER MACHI Remix)	Remix
2016	Ella Chen	"渾身是勁 (Me vs. Me)"	Producer
2016	Echo Lee	"Beatbox的那個 (Dat Beatboxer)"	Producer
2016	前前後後	我很行(OK)	Producer
2017	反骨男孩 Wackyboys	"决战光明顶 (Boys are bald)"	Producer
2017	反骨男孩 Wackyboys	請問你是處女嗎	Producer
2017	呂薔 Amuyi	愛無所畏 Fearless Girl	Producer
2017	聖結石 Saint	薛丁格的貓 (Schrödinger's Cat)	Producer / Arranger
2017	S.H.E.	SHERO (YOUNGER BROTHER MACHI Remix)	Remix
2018	反骨男孩 Wackyboys	瘋狂滋味	Mixer
2018	反骨男孩 Wackyboys	Five Banana (Havana Parody)	Remix
2018	反骨男孩 Wackyboys	痘痘那邊 (Skin Life)	Producer
2018	林宥嘉 Yoga Lin	說謊 Fairy Tale (YOUNGER BROTHER MACHI VIP Remix)	Remix
2018	李優 Uriko	迷惘美 Dazzled Darling	Mixer
2018	李宓 Mina	思汗	Producer
2018	麻吉弟弟 YOUNGER BROTHER MACHI	Flight Mode (飛航模式)	Producer
2018	陳零九 Nine Chen	特製溫柔 (Special Fondness)	Composer / Arranger
2019	反骨男孩 Wackyboys	壓在地上打	Producer

=== Albums ===
Year	Name	Title	Release date	Label	Genre
2003	Oh My!	劈哩啪啦 受不了 (Can't Stand It) 噩夢 (Nightmare) 電動王 麻吉弟弟 - Remix I Need U Let Me Free Daddy 95 Oh My 籃球 (Basketball)	August, 2003	Warner Music Taiwan	Pop
2015	I'm Back EP	"麻吉弟弟回来了 (I’m Back)"	July 10, 2015	Independent	Dubstep
2015	I'm Back EP	"好胆麦走 (Brave)"	August 8, 2015	Independent	Dubstep
2015	I'm Back EP	"杰作 (Magnimopus)"	October 19, 2015	Independent	Electro
2015	I'm Back EP	"逆转 (Reversal)"	October 19, 2015	Independent	Dubstep
2017	大逆有道 My Law EP	YOUNGER BROTHER MACHI 2.0 (大人物) ft. 熊仔 被愛妄想症 Love Delusion ft. Boon Hui Lu 大逆有道 My Law ft. 周定緯 親愛的炸彈 Dear Bomb YOUNGER BROTHER MACHI is Back VIP	October 27, 2017	HIM International	Pop Hip Hop Rap Dubstep
2019	發浪 My Wave LP	Playboy ft. Shou Showoff Sweet Hopscotch Candy Dream Lucky ft. Rayray Only You 發浪 My Wave Holding On	June 14, 2019	Super Music Studio 超級音樂工作室	Pop Hip Hop Rap Trap
