= Dashe District =

District in Kaohsiung, Taiwan

Coordinates: 22.743098°N 120.371334°E

Dashe 大社區
- District
- Dashe District
- Emblem of Dashe District

- Dashe District in Kaohsiung City
- Country: Taiwan
- Region: Southern Taiwan

Population (October 2023)
  - Total: 33,696
- Website: dsrtg.kcg.gov.tw/en/

Dashe District (Chinese: 大社區; pinyin: Dàshè Qū; Wade–Giles: Ta^{4}-she^{4} Ch'ü^{1}) is a suburban district in southwest Kaohsiung City, Taiwan.

== History ==
After the handover of Taiwan from Japan to the Republic of China in 1945, Dashe was organized as a rural township of Kaohsiung County. On 25 December 2010, Kaohsiung County was merged with Kaohsiung City and Dashe was upgraded to a district of the city.

== Administrative divisions ==
The district consists of the villages Jiacheng, Baoshe, Baoan, Dashe, Cuibing, Sannai, Guanyin, Shennong, and Zhongli.

== Education ==
- Morrison Academy Kaohsiung

=== Junior high schools ===
- Kaohsiung Municipal Dashe District Junior High School (高雄市立大社國民中學)

=== Primary schools ===
- Kaohsiung Municipal Dashe District Dashe Primary School (高雄市大社區大社國民小學)
- Kaohsiung Municipal Dashe District Jiacheng Primary School (高雄市大社區嘉誠國民小學)
- Kaohsiung Municipal Dashe District Guanyin Primary School (高雄市大社區觀音國民小學)

== Tourist attractions ==
- Guanyinshan Dajue Temple
- Mount Guanyin
