= Interscholastic Association of Southeast Asian Schools =

Association of schools in Southeast Asia

IASAS Emblem

The Interscholastic Association of Southeast Asian Schools (IASAS) is an association of six private schools in and around Southeast Asia. The member schools are International School Bangkok (Thailand), International School of Kuala Lumpur (Malaysia), International School Manila (Philippines), Jakarta Intercultural School (Indonesia), Singapore American School (Singapore), and Taipei American School (Taiwan).

High-level competitions and events involving teams or groups from the IASAS schools are held throughout the school year in areas of sports, or cultural and artistic events. Sports competitions are organized into three separate seasons, and tournaments are held at the end of approximately 10-week seasons. Cultural and Artistic events are held in separate seasons from sports, with Model United Nations during one season (non-competitive event), and the Arts events during another season. Each of the IASAS schools rotate the hosting of events, based on available facilities and current events of each country. While participating in events, students are expected to adhere to a strict code of conduct. Students traveling to other schools to participate in IASAS events stay with families of students from the host school. The events, organized by season, are listed below.

== Sports ==
The first season of IASAS, held in October, includes soccer, volleyball, and cross country running. The second season of IASAS, held in February, includes basketball, rugby union (for men), touch rugby (for women), swimming, and tennis. The third season of IASAS, held in April, includes badminton, fastpitch softball (for women) and baseball (for men), golf, and track and field. In addition to the culminating IASAS events that occur at the end of each season, athletics exchanges are held during the season so that teams have an opportunity to see the competition from the other schools. These exchanges usually only involve three or four of the IASAS schools at a time, and no awards are given for winning an exchange. In fall 2019, International School of Manila held a 'Super IASAS', with all season one sports occurring in the same location. In the 2020–21 and the 2021–22 academic year, no in-person IASAS events were held in light of the ongoing effects of the COVID-19 pandemic.

== 2025-26 Events ==
For the 2025–26 school year of the Interscholastic Association of Southeast Asian Schools, tournaments were distributed across multiple host schools by sport rather than being held in a single location per season. Season 1 (15–19 October 2025) saw volleyball and cross country hosted in Jakarta by Jakarta Intercultural School, while soccer was held in Manila at International School Manila. Season 2 (28 January – 1 February 2026) was similarly divided, with swimming hosted in Singapore by Singapore American School, basketball and tennis in Bangkok at International School Bangkok, and rugby/touch in Taipei at Taipei American School. This multi-site hosting structure reflects IASAS’s model of rotating events among its member institutions across Southeast and East Asia.

Season 3 (8–12 April 2026) continued with this approach, with tournaments again being held at multiple member schools. Baseball and softball took place in Kuala Lumpur at International School of Kuala Lumpur, track and field and golf were hosted in Singapore by Singapore American School, and badminton was held in Jakarta at Jakarta Intercultural School.

== Non-competitive events ==
The Leadership Convention, a conference for student peer-helper groups took place in September 2005, 2006, and 2007, but was discontinued during the 2008–2009 academic year due to the effort to reduce unnecessary travel for non-competitive events. Model United Nations is held in November, usually with additional schools participating.

Model United Nations took place in Kuala Lumpur in 2025 at International School of Kuala Lumpur, themed Building a Better Future

== Cultural convention ==
Cultural Convention (CC) is held in March and includes three separate events: "Music", "Dance, Drama, Art and Theatre Tech (Stagecraft)", and " Speech and Debate" (called "Debate and Forensics" until 2025). The music delegation includes choir, strings, band and pianists. Speech events include Original Oratory, Oral Interpretation, Extemporaneous Speaking, and Impromptu. While the first IASAS CC combined all events into a single convention, in the modern CC the three components take place concurrently but are typically hosted in different schools.

== Other events ==
- Math is not held as a traveling event but as a competition comparing the American Mathematics Contest results of students from each school. Top scores from the AMC 12 test are used to comprise the Varsity math team and the top scores from the AMC 10 test are used to comprise the Junior Varsity math team.
- Chess has been an experimental event since 2013
- The IASAS Film Exchange has been ongoing since 2016, where some films are chosen by each IASAS school to be represented. Since last year, IASAS Film is now a part of the program and last year had several films from the International School of Kuala Lumpur (ISKL) that hit the road and were globally recognised by various international film festivals including "Candidate 33" by Abhig Ravichandran,"Ding!" by Xinti Lim and Haider Malik, and "Now or Never" by Xinti Lim and Haider Malik. IASAS Film in 2025 was held at Singapore American School from the 5th of November till the 9th.
- The IASAS Service Conference has been ongoing virtually since 2021, with service clubs and projects from each school sharing their work with service leaders across the IASAS schools.
