= Paul Liao =

Taiwanese businessman

Paul Liao (simplified Chinese: 廖伟志; traditional Chinese: 廖偉志; pinyin: Liào Wěizhì; 5 October 1949 – 20 May 2015) was a Taiwanese businessman. He was born in Keelung. Liao was the founder of the Breeze Group which was started as a metals trading company in 1975. He opened his first shopping mall, the Breeze Center, under the Breeze brand in 2001, and shortly afterward left the metals industry. He also owned the Howard Hotels chain located in Taiwan. Liao was named Taiwan's #33 richest person by Forbes magazine in 2009 with a net worth of $670 million. By 2014, his holdings were valued at $800 million, but Liao's rank had dropped to #46.

Liao, a black belt in taekwondo, died of lung cancer at Taipei Veterans General Hospital in Taipei on 20 May 2015. He was 65. His son, Henry Liao, is married to actress and businesswoman Aimee Sun.
