= Southern Taiwan Science Park =

Science park in Taiwan

Southern Taiwan Science Park 南部科學園區
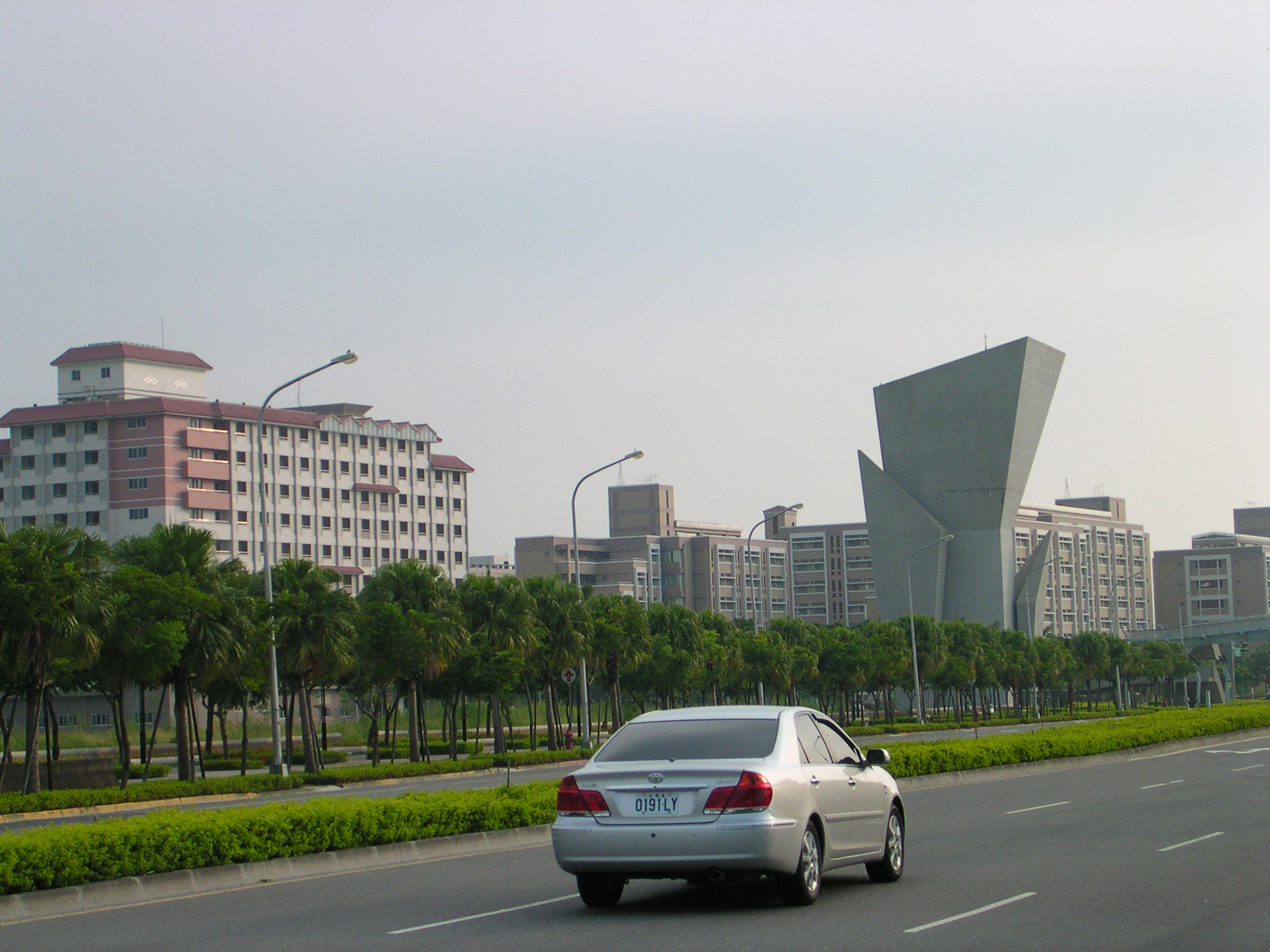
- East Entrance of Tainan Science Park
- Location: Chiayi County; Tainan; Kaohsiung; Pingtung
- Opening date: 1997
- Website: www.stsp.gov.tw

The Southern Taiwan Science Park (STSP; Chinese: 南部科學園區; pinyin: Nánbù Kēxué Gōngyè Yuánqū), often abbreviated 南科 (pinyin: Nánkē), is a science park established by the government of Taiwan and straddles in Southern Taiwan.

== Overview ==
The science park was first proposed at an Executive Yuan meeting on 1 July 1993, and the Southern Taiwan Science Park Development Plan was approved in May 1995. By 2000, 80% of the industrial land had been leased out. Thus, in May 2000 the Intellectual Science Park developed by the Taiwan Sugar Corporation (in Lujhu) was designated as the site of Luzhu Science Park. It was renamed to Kaohsiung Science Park and approved on 27 July 2004. In 2009, there were a total of 130 companies based in the park and sales totaled NT$461 billion.

Key industries in the park include integrated circuits, optoelectronics, green energy, and biotechnology. Prominent companies based in the park include the National Laboratory Animal Center, TSMC, InnoLux Corporation, and United Microelectronics Corporation.

== Locations ==
Currently, the park covers six locations:

- Chiayi Science Park (23.4732°N 120.301°E), covering 217 acres (0.88 km^{2}).
- Tainan Science Park (23.107°N 120.272°E), covering 2,578 acres (10.43 km^{2}).
- Kaohsiung Science Park (22.835°N 120.257°E), covering 1,409 acres (5.70 km^{2}).
- Ciaotao Science Park (22.768°N 120.334°E), covering 648 acres (2.62 km^{2}).
- Nanzih Science Park (22.708°N 120.312°E), covering 433 acres (1.75 km^{2}).
- Pingtung Science Park (22.655°N 120.453°E), covering 181 acres (0.73 km^{2}).

== See also ==
- Southern Taiwan Semiconductor Corridor
- Ministry of Science and Technology (Taiwan)
- Business cluster
- Hsinchu Science Park
- Central Taiwan Science Park
- National Nanke International Experimental High School
- Megasite
- Taoyuan Aerotropolis
