= Richard Vuylsteke =

American diplomat

Richard R. Vuylsteke is the current president of the East–West Center. He has previously worked as a journalist and in academia.

From 2008 to 2016, he was the president of the American Chamber of Commerce in Hong Kong. He was formerly the executive director of the American Chamber of Commerce in Taipei. He was on the board of directors of Taipei American School, and wrote a history of the school, Ties that Bind, published in 1999.

In February 2008, Vuylsteke was appointed president of the American Chamber of Commerce in Hong Kong. He took office as the East–West Center's 11th chief executive on July 1, 2017.

He has a wife, Josephine Wu Vuylsteke, and three sons. He is a graduate of Illinois College and earned his M.A. and PhD from University of Hawaiʻi at Mānoa.
