= American School in Taichung =

Location
- Taichung, Taiwan; Taiwan; 24°10′9.54″N 120°44′38.96″E

Information
- Type: Private
- Motto: Excellence, Integrity, Responsibility
- Established: 1989
- Director: Kelly Konicki
- Staff: 12
- Faculty: 27
- Grades: 1–12
- Campus size: Approximately two hectares
- Campus type: Private International School
- Colours: Red, white, blue
- Mascot: Eagle
- Website: www.astaichung.com

The American School in Taichung (AST; Chinese: 台中美國學校; pinyin: Táizhōng Měiguó Xuéxiào) is an international school in Taichung, Taiwan offering grades one to twelve.

The school, founded in 1989, was previously known as Lincoln American School. It is fully accredited by the Western Association of Schools and Colleges (WASC) and hosts the annual Taiwan Model United Nations (TAIMUN) conference.

One of the school's founders, Anna Lee, is a daughter of former President Lee Teng-hui. The current Head of School is Kelly Konicki.

== History ==
In 1989, Anna Lee and Esther Hanna established a new American school for expatriates' children in Taichung.

The school was located in a townhouse with three bedrooms. Due to its limited resources and facilities, the officers of the Ministry of Education (MOE) and the American Institute in Taiwan (AIT) were hesitant to agree to establish the school.

Eventually, the school moved outside what were, at the time, the city limits of Taichung, into an area that would become the Dakeng Nature Reserve. This location ensures that the area surrounding the school will not become urbanized, thus preserving the existing ecosystem that proves beneficial to supervised student exploration and scientific study.

A new gym was added to the school campus on August 8, 2013.

== Academics ==
The required courses at American School in Taichung are English, Mathematics, Science, History, Physical Education, and two years of a Foreign Language (Spanish or Chinese).

AST also has drama, art, and music programs (choir ensemble, violin, and hand bells). There are two concerts during the year, one in the spring and one in the winter.

Currently (as of the 2012–2013 school year), AST offers eight Advanced Placement courses: AP Statistics, AP Biology, AP US History, AP Calculus AB, AP Literature, AP Chinese, AP Physics, and AP Language.

== Sports and clubs ==
Athletics
American School in Taichung offers many sports for both middle school and high school boys and girls, including: volleyball, soccer, softball, basketball, and cross country. The AST teams participate in tournaments that involve other international and bilingual schools on the island.

=== Organizations ===
Model United Nations (MUN)
TAIMUN was begun in 2005, nd is organized by all high school students at the American School in Taichung, though not every student acts as a delegate; students not acting as delegates participate in administrative and press teams.

Schools from across Taiwan and Asia attend AST's TAIMUN Conference. AST has also attended MUN events in Singapore, Russia, China, and Greece.

== See also ==
- Taipei European School
- Taipei American School
- Hsinchu American School
- Morrison Academy
- Dominican International School
- Kaohsiung American School
- Taipei Japanese School
- Taipei Adventist American School
- Taiwan Adventist International School
- The Primacy Collegiate Academy
