= International School Bangkok =

American-style school in Thailand

International School Bangkok (ISB)
- โรงเรียนสถานศึกษานานาชาติ (ISB)

Location
- 39/7 Soi Nichada Thani, Samakee Road, Pakkret, Nonthaburi 11120; Greater Bangkok; Thailand; 13.8928°N 100.5256°E

Information
- Type: International school
- Established: 1951
- Dean: Peter Assimakopoulos
- Principal: Kate Mc Kenna
- Headmistress: Usa Somboon
- Headmaster: Dr. Daisy Pellant
- Grades: Preschool-12
- Age range: 3-18
- Enrollment: 1,900
- Language: English
- Campus size: 37 acres (0.15 km^{2})
- Campus type: Suburban, gated community
- Colors: Black (primary); Gold (secondary)
- Athletics: Soccer, volleyball, cross country, basketball, swimming, tennis, gymnastics, rugby, wrestling, baseball, softball, badminton, track & field
- Athletics conference: Interscholastic Association of Southeast Asian Schools (IASAS)
- Mascot: Panther
- Accreditation: Western Association of Schools and Colleges (WASC) (USA)
- Tuition: Intensive Learning Needs: $27,711; Pre-Kindergarten: $18,320; Elementary (Grades K-5): $28,211; Middle (Grades 6-8): $31,662; High (Grades 9-12): $33,289; (A one-time registration fee of approximately $8,629 is also charged)
- Website: www.isb.ac.th

The International School Bangkok (ISB); Thai: โรงเรียนสถานศึกษานานาชาติ, RTGS: Rong Rian Sathan Suksa Nana Chat) is a private PK-12 American-style school in the Pak Kret District of Nonthaburi Province, Thailand in the Bangkok Metropolitan Area. It is accredited by the Western Association of Schools and Colleges (WASC) in the United States. ISB was the first school in Thailand to offer the International Baccalaureate (IB) Diploma Program (DP).

== History ==
=== Foundation ===
ISB first opened as the International Children's Center on the grounds of the U.S. Embassy Bangkok in 1951. It was the first international school to open in Thailand and served U.S. Embassy families and other expatriates in Bangkok at the time. Its initial enrollment was 50 children of United Nations and U.S. diplomats. First located on Rajadamri Road, it was known as the International Children's Center (ICC). ISB then expanded to provide both primary and secondary education for English-speaking children in Bangkok. In 1960, ISB moved from the U.S. Embassy-owned grounds to Sukhumvit Soi 15. A few years later, ISB opened a second campus on Viphavadi Rangsit road, but it closed in the mid-1970s with the American drawdown from Vietnam. Finally in 1992, ISB was relocated from Soi 15 to the present US$25-million campus in the Pak Kret District, Nonthaburi Province, within Nichada Thani as "campus town"; on a land that it owns and maintains itself, and that consists of a separate elementary, middle, and high schools interwoven into one Thai-style complex. ISB has students from over 50 countries enrolled.

Parents oversee the operation of ISB, which is a non-profit and non-sectarian school. Parents are members of the school association and elect the governing board of ISB.

== Notable alumni ==
- William E. Heinecke (1967) - Chairman and CEO of Minor Food Group companies
- Pamela J. H. Slutz (1967) - Retired U.S. Foreign Service Officer; Ambassador to Mongolia (2003-6) and Burundi (2009–12)
- Ho Kwon Ping (1969) - Founder, Banyan Tree Hotels & Resorts and #19 on Forbes' Singapore's 40 Richest
- Charles Leavitt (1970) - Screenwriter for The Mighty, K-PAX, and Blood Diamond
- Michael Young (1970) - TV Personality & Host of "Kids Are People Too" (1978) Executive Producer "Shop Like a Star" (2008)
- Susan Schwab (1972) - Current Chief United States Trade Representative, and former president and CEO of the University of Maryland
- Richard Powers (1975) Accomplished writer - Finalist, Pulitzer Prize for Fiction, 2006
- Madolyn Smith (1975) Actress - Urban Cowboy, All of Me, Sadat
- Timothy F. Geithner (1979) - US Secretary of the Treasury in President Barack Obama's administration, ninth president of the Federal Reserve Bank of New York
- Thant Myint-U (1983) - Myanmar presidential adviser, prize-winning historian and author, conservationist, former United Nations official, grandson of U Thant, former Secretary General of the United Nations
- Rob McKenna (1984) - Former Attorney General for the State of Washington
- Tammy Duckworth (1985) - Senator of Illinois (D)- Elected November 8, 2016. Democratic United States House Representative in Illinois's 8th congressional district - elected November 6, 2012.
- Mary-Louise Parker - Nancy Botwin in hit TV series "Weeds". Sarah Ross in the movie "Red"
- Martin Vengadesan (1990) (Malaysian journalist and writer)
- Tom Cochran - Obama administration official
- Charm Onwarin Osathanond (2005) - Miss Thailand Universe 2006
- Sarunrat "Lydia" Visutthithada (2005) - Famous Thai Pop Star
- Maria Ehren (2010) Miss Thailand Universe 2017
- Amalie Iuel (2013) Olympic Track & Field Athlete - Member of Norwegian National Team in the 2016 Summer Olympics in Rio, competed in 400m hurdles event, attended the University of Southern California
