= Taipei International Christian Academy =

- #27-1, 5F, Zhong Zheng Rd Section 2 Taipei 112; Republic of China (Taiwan)

Information
- Established: 2011 - presently closed / defunct
- Website: www.ticaschol.org

Taipei International Christian Academy (TICA) was an International American Curriculum School Cooperative serving parents and students in Taipei. The academy's educational program was Christ-centered, project-based, authentically service-focused, and inclusive of students with special needs. The closure of its website suggests that the school may have ceased operations as well.

== History ==
Taipei International Christian Academy was started in 2011 as a new educational program in Taipei as an alternative to the other existing international/foreign schools. TICA has one of the very few English special education programs in Asia.
