= Morrison Academy Kaohsiung =

Coordinates: 24°11′12.21″N 120°40′48.33″E

Morrison Academy Kaohsiung 馬禮遜學校高雄分校
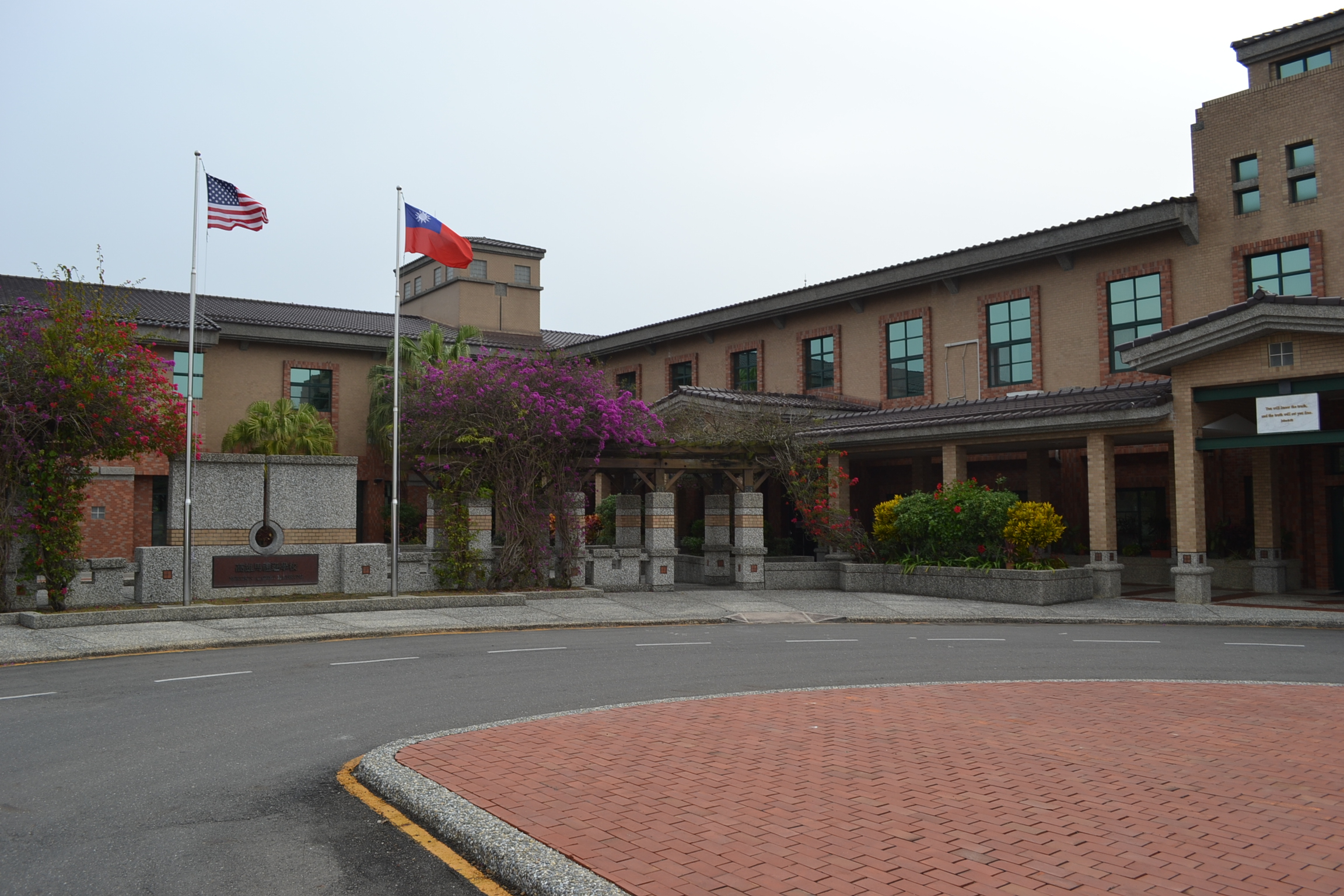
- Entrance to Morrison Academy Kaohsiung

Location
- 42 Chia Cheng Rd. Dashe District, Kaohsiung 81546; Taiwan

Information
- Type: Private International School; Christian School
- Motto: "Then you will know the truth, and the truth will set you free." -- John 8:32
- Established: 1974
- Superintendent: Julie Heinsman
- Principal: Dr. Dan Kim
- Faculty: 61
- Grades: Kindergarten-12th grade
- Enrollment: 270
- Campus: Suburb
- Colors: Red and black
- Mascot: Shark
- Accreditation: ACSI, WASC
- Phone: +886-7-356-1190
- Website: kaohsiung.mca.org.tw

Morrison Academy Kaohsiung (MAK) is a K–12 Christian International school in Dashe District, Kaohsiung, Taiwan. It is the southern satellite school of the Morrison Academy school system.

The school is jointly accredited by the Western Association of Schools and Colleges and the Association of Christian Schools International.

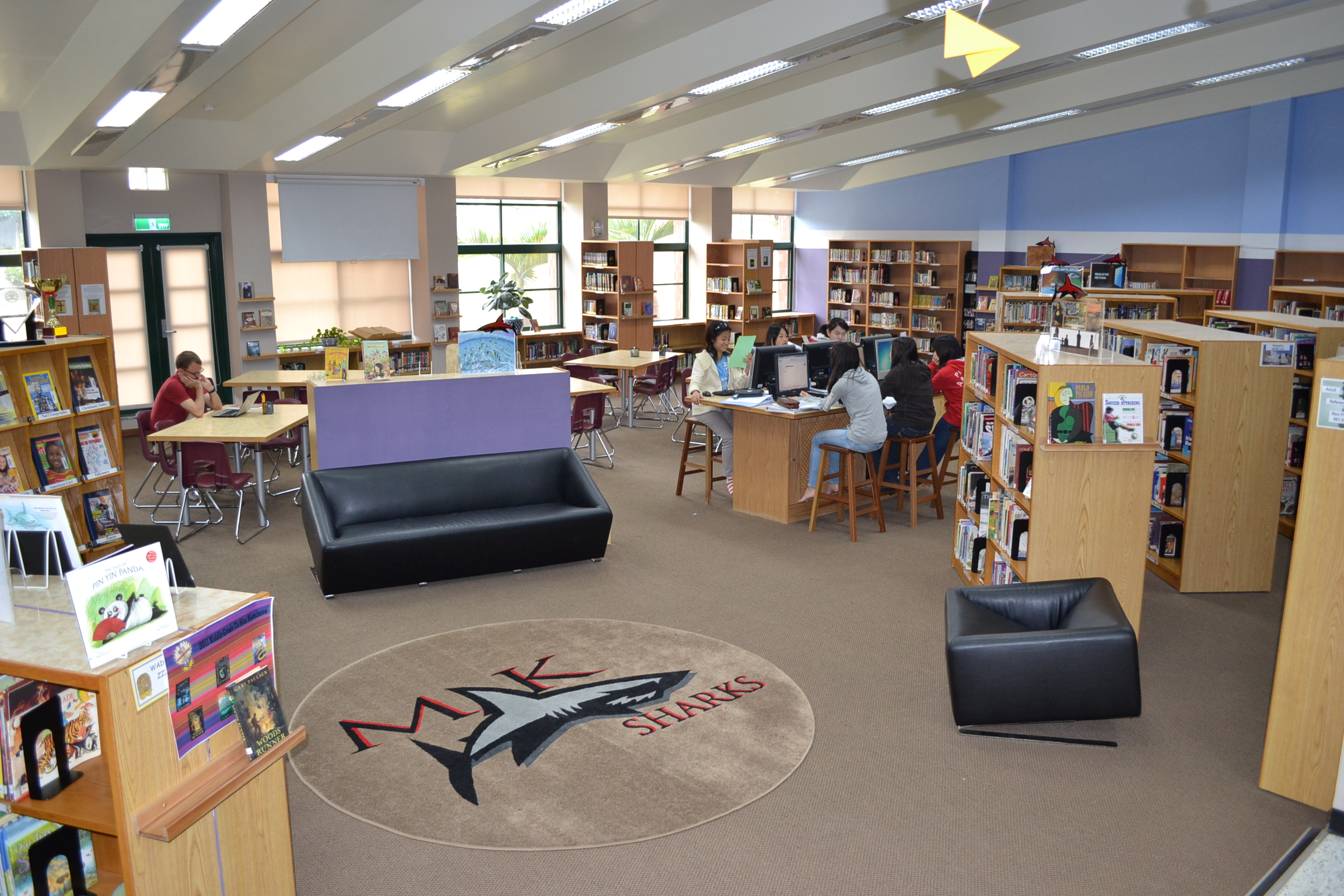
MAK's library

== Campus ==
Following its establishment, the campus moved twice. The current MAK campus is located in Dashe District, a suburban district of Kaohsiung City, about a 20-minute drive from downtown Kaohsiung. The campus was built in 2000 on land leased from the Taiwan Sugar Corporation.

MAK facilities include:

- 20 classrooms equipped with LCD projectors, TVs, Chromecast, and Apple TVs
- two music rooms ready for band and strings Orchestra
- a library
- a computer lab and multi-media lab
- two science labs
- an air-conditioned, indoor gymnasium
- an outdoor basketball/volleyball court
- two soccer fields
- a 300-meter sand-and-concrete track
- a weight/fitness room
- an outdoor covered play area
- a makerspace and tinker lab

== Student body ==
The K-12 enrollment at MAK is about 380 (as of 2019). The faculty to student ratio is about 1:5.

== History ==
Morrison Christian Academy started over 50 years ago in Taichung in a bamboo hut with six children. Soon after its inception, missionary groups quickly got organized and expanded this school to thirty-five students, and named the school after Robert Morrison, the first Protestant missionary to mainland China.

In Kaohsiung, many missionary children went to the U.S. Department of Defense School, but when it closed in 1974, they were without a school. Morrison Academy opened a K-8 school (called Morrison Academy Kaohsiung) near Cheng Ching Lake.

In two years, the school grew from three teachers and thirty-three students to four teachers and forty-five students. The school expanded further by building a six-classroom school at Kao Tan. The school moved again in 1996, back to Cheng Ching Lake and shared a campus with the Da Hua Elementary School in Fengshan. In 2000, they opened the current MAK campus.

== See also ==
- Education in Taiwan
