= Hsinchu International School =

Coordinates: 24.7965°N 120.9429°E

- 新竹荷蘭國際學校
- #290, Niu Pu East Road, Xiangshan, Hsinchu City 30091; Taiwan

Information
- Type: Private International School
- Established: 1981
- Elementary School Principal: Rowena Lines
- Head of school: Rowena Lines
- Grades: Pre-kindergarten – 12th Grade
- Mascot: Bamboo; Lion
- Accreditation: Western Association of Schools and Colleges
- Tuition: Pre-K & Kindergarten: NT$ 168,000; 1st - 4th Grade: NT$ 181,000; 5th - 6th Grade: NT$ 188,000; Grades 7 – 12: NT$ 237,000
- Website: hdis.hc.edu.tw

Hsinchu International School (HIS; Chinese: 新竹荷蘭國際學校; Chinese: 新竹荷兰国际学校; pinyin: Xīnzhú Hélán Guójì Xuéxiào; Wade–Giles: Hsinchu Helan Kuochi Hsuehsiao) is a private, international school located in Xiangshan District, Hsinchu City, Taiwan offering education to students who hold foreign (i.e. non-ROC) passports.

== History ==
Founded in 1981 by the Dutch Electronics Company Philips as a company school for the expatriate families they employed, it later grew to serve other expatriate families. While the original name of the school is "Hsinchu Dutch International School", the Dutch language or curriculum has never been taught, but the Chinese name reflects the history of the school.

In 1988, the school became an independent, licensed school through the Dutch Trade Office. It is officially recognized by the American Institute in Taiwan and Ministry of Education. It began as a K-7 grade school, but added a Secondary Department. The Secondary Department (grades 7 to 12) received WASC candidacy in August 2008 and attained full accreditation in August 2011.

== Campus ==
HIS relocated to its current location in 2007, a five-story campus adjacent to Xiangshan Municipal Elementary School. There is an auditorium, music studios, a weight room, a cafeteria, science laboratories (for both elementary and secondary students), a dance room, a computer lab, and a library within the school.
