= I-Shou International School =

School in Dashu, Kaohsiung, Taiwan

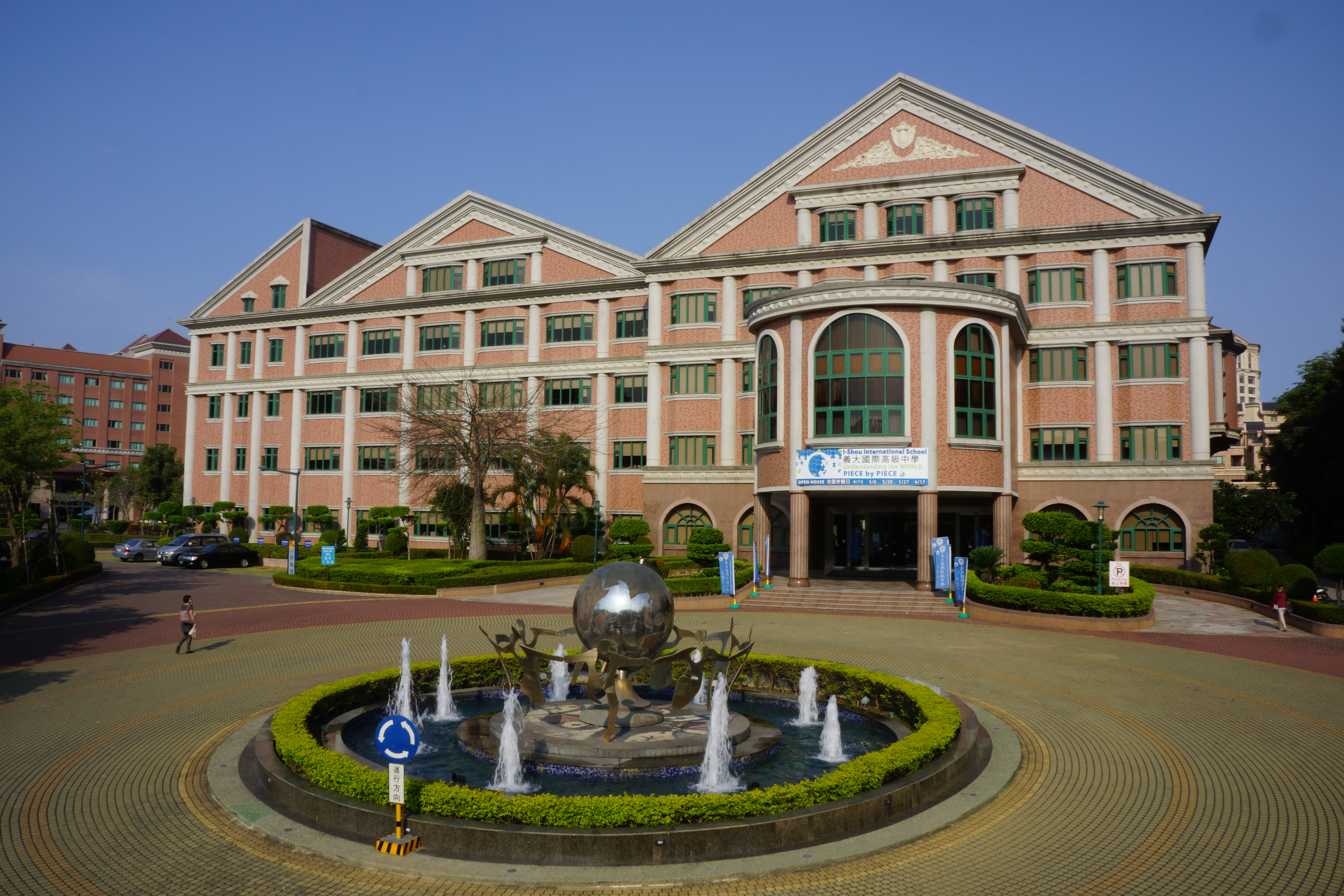

Location
- Kaohsiung City; Taiwan
- Coordinates: 22°43′42″N 120°24′18″E

Information
- Type: Private, co-educational, day and boarding
- Established: 2004
- Principal: Chien-Wei (Roger) Lee
- Headmaster: Matthew Lennon
- Enrolment: 700 (K–12)
- Slogan: "Making the World a better place, One Student at a time"
- Website: https://www.iis.kh.edu.tw/

The I-Shou International School (Chinese: 義大國際高級中學), a bilingual school, is an international school in Dashu District, Kaohsiung, Taiwan.

== Curriculum ==
I-Shou International School is the first school in Taiwan that is authorized to offer the International Baccalaureate (IB) Primary Years Program (PYP), Middle Years Program (MYP) and the IB Diploma Program (DP). In 2015, the school was accredited by the Council of International Schools (CIS).

== See also ==
- Education in Taiwan
