= Ivy Collegiate Academy =

- 320, Lane 165, Section 1, Tan-Hsing Rd., Tanzi District, Taichung, Taiwan

Information
- Type: Private International School
- Established: 2005
- Head of school: Dr. Christos Perez
- Enrollment: 216 students
- Colors: Blue and White
- Athletics conference: SCISAC
- Mascot: Phoenix
- Tuition: Varies
- Website: ica.ivyjhs.tc.edu.tw

Ivy Collegiate Academy is a coeducational college preparatory day and boarding school enrolling students in grades 7–12.

Ivy Collegiate Academy is located in Tanzi District, Taichung, Taiwan, and is accredited by the Western Association of Schools and Colleges.

== History ==
Founded in 2005, Ivy Collegiate Academy (ICA) is a private coeducational college preparatory boarding and day school enrolling students in grades 7–12. ICA follows the American AP curriculum offering an AP Capstone Diploma to eligible students. The robust activities program is modeled after American boarding schools.
