= Taipei American School =

Private international school in Taiwan

Taipei American School 美國臺北學校

Location
- 800 Chung Shan N. Road, Section 6, Taipei 11152; Republic of China (Taiwan); 25°6′57″N 121°31′48″E

Information
- Type: Private independent school
- Established: 1949
- CEEB code: 694210
- Faculty: 269
- Enrollment: 820 lower school, 586 middle school, 885 upper school
- Campus size: 15 acres (61,000 m^{2})
- Campus type: Urban
- Colors: Blue and gold
- Mascot: Tiger
- Team name: Tigers and Tiger sharks
- Tuition: NT $981,880 (US $31,930.24) per student for middle and upper school NT $890,370 (US $28,954.38) per student for lower school
- Website: www.tas.edu.tw

Taipei American School
- Traditional Chinese: 美國臺北學校
- Simplified Chinese: 美国台北学校
Transcriptions
Standard Mandarin
- Hanyu Pinyin: Táiběi Měiguó Xuéxiào
- Wade–Giles: T'ai-pei Mei-kuo Hsüeh-hsiao
- Tongyong Pinyin: Taibei Meiguo Syuesiao
Southern Min
- Hokkien POJ: Tâi-pak Bí-kok Ha̍k-hāu

Taipei American School (TAS; Chinese: 美國臺北學校; pinyin: Táiběi Měiguó Xuéxiào) is a U.S Department of State Assisted private international school with an American-based curriculum located in Tianmu, Shilin District, Taipei, Taiwan. TAS serves students from pre-kindergarten through grade 12. At the high school, students may choose from a range of courses, including honors, AP, and IB courses, that fulfill the full IB Diploma Program.

Founded in 1949, the school served as a U.S. Department of Defense contract school during the U.S. military presence in Taiwan from the 1950s to 1970s. Upon termination of diplomatic relations between the United States and the ROC in 1979, TAS was reorganized into a private international school. The school is operated by the Taipei American School Foundation under contract to the American Institute in Taiwan, the United States' quasi-embassy in Taiwan. The school is a member of the G30 Schools Group.

Most graduates of TAS attend colleges and universities in the United States. As required by ROC law, TAS admits only students who hold foreign (i.e., non-ROC) passports.

== History ==
The first meeting of Taipei American School took place on September 26, 1949, in the basement of Presbyterian Theological Seminary at Zhongshan North Road, with eight students. This marked the beginning of the "missionary era" where Taiwanese and American medical missionaries were instrumental in founding TAS and providing it with students. The first class of students included American, European, and Taiwanese students.

By 1951, the influx of missionaries and business people escaping from the communist victory in mainland China caused enrollment to grow to 120 students. By 1952, TAS was forced to relocate to Nong'an East Road to provide space for the growing student population

In 1953, the U.S. Military Assistance Advisory Group was established in Taiwan. This brought to the island a large number of U.S. military personnel. Along with these military personnel came their families, including children needing an American-style education. TAS became the school for the children of the U.S. military personnel. In the summer of 1953, TAS constructed a much larger campus at Chang'an East Road.

In 1956, TAS graduated its first class of 14 seniors. By then, the Chang'an campus had approximately 50 faculty members and 1,000 students. In 1957, Mr. Wayne Nesbitt served as the first superintendent of the school.

In 1959, TAS purchased a 22 acre (89,000 m^{2}) site in Shilin for a new campus. In March 1960, the kindergarten and lower school moved into a 36-classroom 5-wing complex on the site. The upper school remained at the Chang'an campus until 1964, when the last upper school facilities were completed. By 1969, TAS enrollment reached its highest point with nearly 3,000 students.

Bordered on two sides by a river, the Shilin campus was prone to flooding during the typhoons experienced on Taiwan when the protective dikes were breached. Cleanup took several days as classrooms were dried out and mud and silt were removed.

In the 1970s, Taiwan's transforming economy brought foreign businessmen and overseas Chinese into the local economy, setting the stage for TAS's later transformation even as enrollment shrank dramatically due to the U.S. military pull-out from Taiwan. By the late seventies, student enrollment dropped to approximately 700 students. Within a few years, enrollment started to increase again as overseas Chinese with foreign passports arrived in Taiwan searching for American educational facilities for their children. By the early eighties, the majority of students were ethnically Taiwanese and also U.S. citizens.

In September 1989, TAS relocated to its present campus in Tianmu, Taipei. To obtain use of the government land in Tianmu, TAS exchanged title to its Shihlin property for a long-term lease on the Tianmu site at a concessionary rent.

The 50th anniversary of Taipei American School was celebrated in 1999. As part of this celebration, TAS published a book documenting the history of the school: "Ties That Bind", authored by Richard Vuylsteke. In 2019, TAS celebrated its seventieth anniversary.

== Campus ==
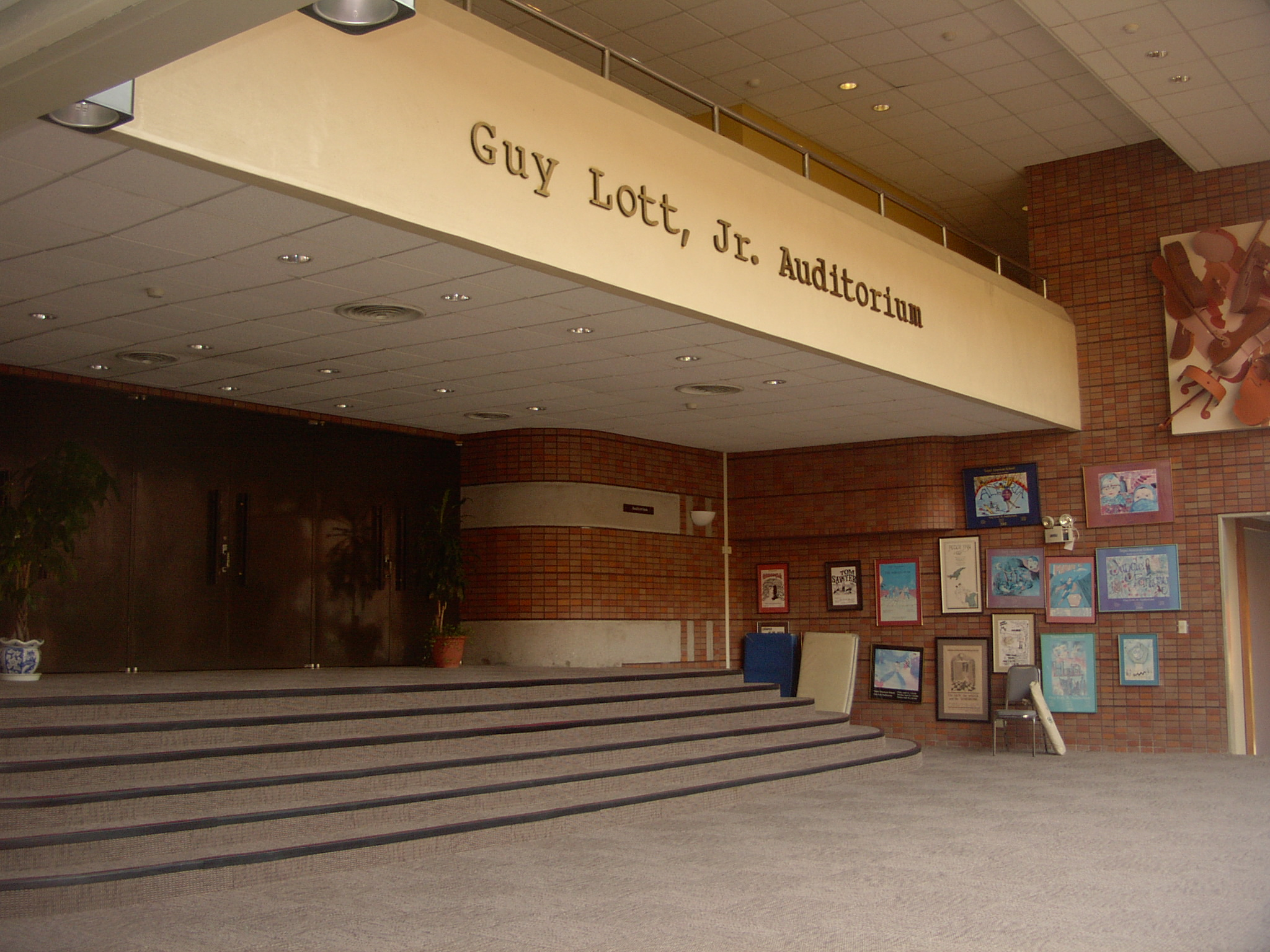
Guy Lott, Junior Auditorium

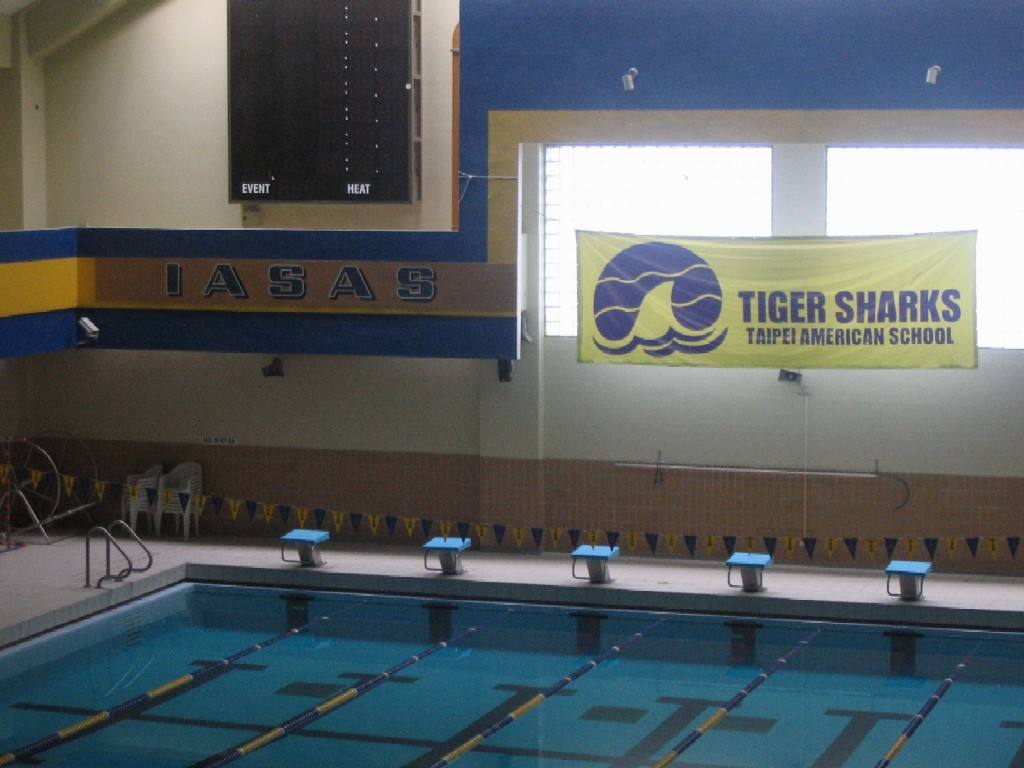
Indoor swimming pool

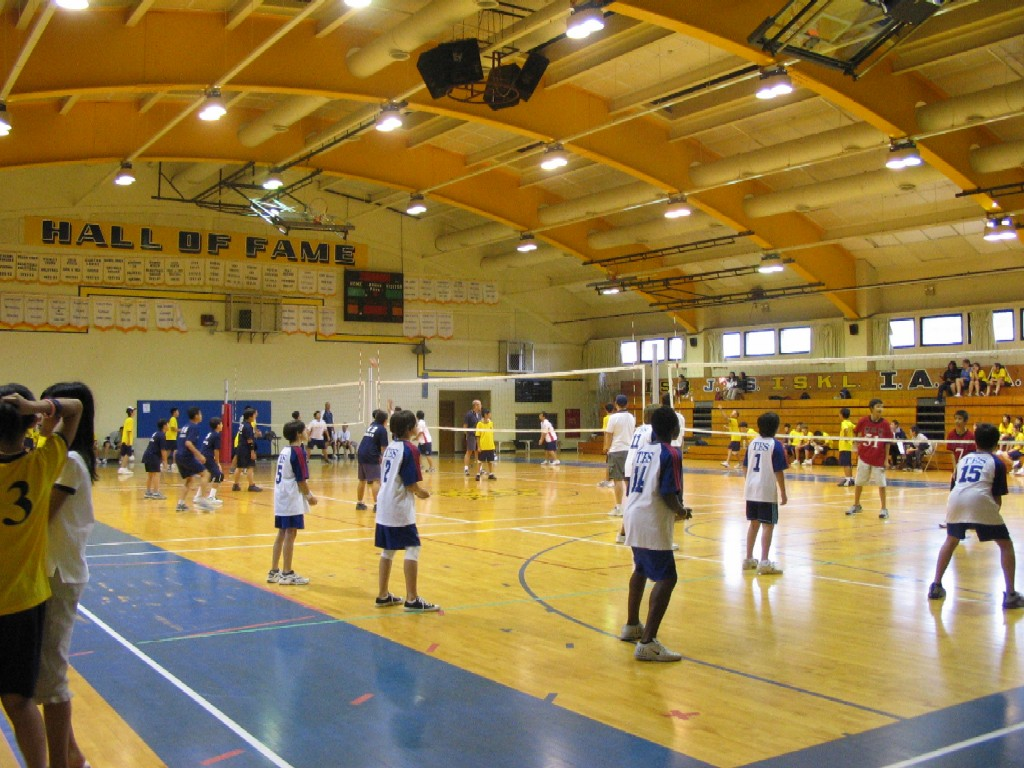
Middle School Gym

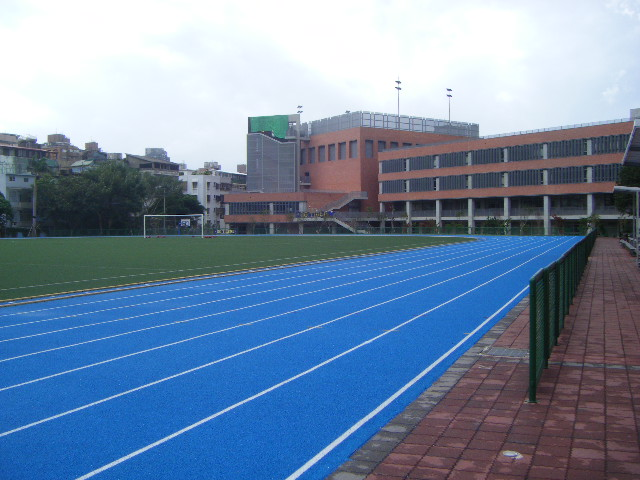
TAS track and field

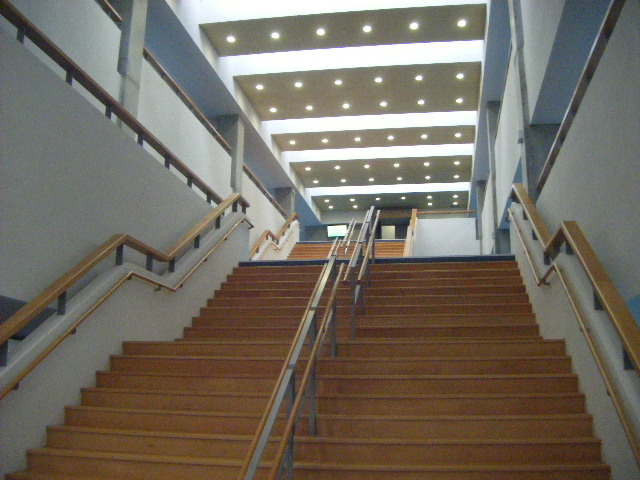
TAS atrium

The current 15-acre (61,000 m^{2}) campus, completed in 1989, consists of a four-story complex with approximately 200 classrooms. In September 2010, TAS broke ground for the construction of three new buildings on its current campus: the new upper school building featuring science and technology classrooms with research and robotics laboratories, the Liu Lim Arts Center, and another gymnasium with covered and outdoor tennis courts.

The independently operated Taipei Youth Program Association (TYPA) is located at TAS and uses the campus facilities. The school is located directly across the street from Taipei Japanese School.

== Organization ==
TAS is divided into three divisions: lower, middle, and upper schools. The lower school (elementary) includes pre-kindergarten (known as Kindergarten A), kindergarten, and grades 1 through 5. The middle school (junior high) includes grades 6 through 8. The upper school (high school) includes grades 9 through 12. Each division is run by a principal and 2 assistant principals.

The superintendent serves as school head. The Taipei American School Board of Directors a hybrid board consisting of nine elected Board members and two appointed Board members. Elected Board members serve for three-year terms and appointed Board members serve for four-year terms. Board members serve without compensation and have the primary task of formulating and evaluating all school policies and overseeing the school's financial affairs. It is their responsibility to see that the resources are in place to support excellence in all areas, always prioritizing the interests of the students first. The Board meets monthly and invites parents and faculty to attend these meetings. Board members are elected by the Taipei American School Association, which consists of all parents or guardians of children attending TAS.

== Student body ==
The combined KA-12 school enrollment is approximately 2500. TAS abides by the Republic of China Foreign Schools Law, which requires all international schools to admit only students who hold non-ROC passports.

== Academics ==
The Upper School offers 30 Advanced Placement (AP) courses. Additionally, the school also offers 37 International Baccalaureate (IB) courses and IB diplomas. Students are often given the chance to take AP and/or IB courses, starting from the 9th grade. In many cases, students can take both AP and IB classes, if the school counselor approves.

The Lower school is pre-kindergarten to Grade 5, the Middle school is Grades 6–8, and the Upper school is Grades 9–12 which is a college preparatory program leading to a TAS U.S. high school diploma, Advanced Placement Capstone Diploma or an International Baccalaureate diploma. Almost 100 percent of TAS graduates continue their education at a college or university, the vast majority in the United States. TAS offers support services for mild learning needs.

== Blue & Gold ==
The "Blue & Gold" is the school newspaper of TAS. It is also a member of the National Scholastic Press Association (NSPA). Produced monthly, the newspaper is usually a 12-page broadsheet. Previously known as Paws, the Blue & Gold newspaper has won awards from the National Scholastic Press Association (NSPA).

== Notable alumni ==
- Andrew Chou, class of 2008, a member of the Taiwanese group Machi.
- Aimee Sun, a Taiwanese socialite, media personality, and jewelry designer. She is a co-founder of Breeze Center.
- Christina Chang, class of 1989, actress who appeared in numerous American TV shows including CSI Miami, West Wing, 24, etc. She appeared in several motion pictures, including Live Free or Die Hard, Random Hearts, etc.
- Fei Xiang, also known as Kris Phillips, is a Taiwanese American singer whose credits include being in the original Broadway cast of Miss Saigon.
- Freya Lim, class of 1998, a singer in Taiwan.
- Lara Veronin, class of 2006, former member of the Taiwanese band Nan Quan Mama, which is directed by Taiwanese singer Jay Chou.
- Lin King, class of 2012, Taiwanese-American writer and translator who, since 2024, has won several awards for her English translation of Yang Shuang-zi's 2020 novelTaiwan Travelogue, including and most recently the 2026 International Booker Prize.
- Linda Arrigo, class of 1966, is a democracy activist and former DPP chairman Shih Ming-teh's ex-wife
- Nita Ing, Taiwanese executive and the former CEO of the Taiwan High Speed Rail Corporation.
- Sylvia Chang, class of 1972, Taiwan actress and director who appeared in movies such as Eat Drink Man Woman and The Red Violin
- Takeshi Kaneshiro, class of 1992, is a Taiwanese Japanese actor whose films include Perhaps Love, Returner, House of Flying Daggers, Turn Left, Turn Right, and Chungking Express.
- Terri Kwan, a Taiwanese socialite, actress, media personality.
- Will Pan, class of 1999, a VJ host, actor and singer.
- Yueh-Lin Loo, professor of engineering at Princeton University.
- Taylor Fravel, class of 1989, the Arthur and Ruth Sloan Professor of Political Science at MIT who specializes in international relations and security.

== In popular culture ==
The Taipei American School, Chang'an campus, is the setting for many of the earlier scenes of the 1983 novel China Gate, written by 1963 graduate William Arnold.

== Sports and organizations ==
- Upper School sports teams and groups, whose mascot is the Tiger, compete with members of Interscholastic Association of Southeast Asian Schools (IASAS), as well as local international and Taiwanese schools, clubs, and universities.
- Varsity teams include volleyball, association football, cross Country, rugby, basketball, golf, tennis, swimming, softball, badminton, and track and field teams.
- Non-athletic groups participate in the annual Cultural Convention with other IASAS schools including art, dance, drama, music, debate, and forensics (individual events).
- Students participate in Model United Nations with students from IASAS and other regional schools. The school has also sent delegations to a variety of international conferences, including THIMUN, THIMUN Singapore, Berlin MUN (BERMUN), Harvard MUN (HMUN), Yale MUN (YMUN), Malaysia MUN (MYMUN), MUN Overseas Family School (MY-MUNOFS & MUNOFS), Shanghai American School MUN (SHASMUN), as well as conferences in Taiwan such as Hsinchu MUN (HSINMUN) and Taiwan MUN (TAIMUN). It also hosts its own conference, Taipei American School MUN (TASMUN), and participates regularly in Online MUN (O-MUN) debates.

== NSDA Speech & Debate ==
- In 2022 Taipei American School was the first school outside North America to be recognized as a National Speech and Debate Association top-100 school.
- In 2023 Taipei American School became top-40 Debate School of Excellence and 3rd in the United States in Public Forum Debate

== Controversy ==
On April 27th, 2026, high school robotics and computer sciences teacher James Cloos was arrested at Taoyuan International Airport for illegally smuggling 500ml of liquid Ketamine into Taiwan. Cloos allegedly partnered with a local Taiwanese woman to import liquid Ketamine disguised as a Spree gin bottle via air cargo from Germany. The package was intercepted by German authorities, who notified Taiwanese police. Taiwanese police arrested Cloos while he was embarking on a student robotics competition trip. Prior to TAS, Cloos taught at Weige International School, where he also taught robotics and computer sciences. Cloos has resided in Taiwan for 10 years and currently holds permanent Taiwanese residency.

TAS suffers from a long history of sexual misconduct by both students and faculty members, resulting in several online petitions for transparency and at least one investigation led by TAS-retained third-party consultant McLane Middleton. Key alleged incidents include sexual misconduct from several faculty members towards students, nude photos of high school students being sold under the guise of trading Pokemon cards, and sexual assault incidents between students, leading to expulsion or extended suspension.

== Affiliations ==
- Accredited by the Western Association of Schools and Colleges (WASC).
- Member of the East Asia Regional Council of Overseas Schools (EARCOS).
- Member of Interscholastic Association of Southeast Asian Schools (IASAS)
- Member of the G30 Schools Group

TAS participates in competitive sports and cultural exchanges with the following Southeast Asian international schools:

- International School Bangkok - Bangkok, Thailand
- International School of Kuala Lumpur - Kuala Lumpur, Malaysia
- International School Manila - Manila, Philippines
- Jakarta Intercultural School - Jakarta, Indonesia
- Singapore American School - Singapore

== See also ==
- Dominican International School
- Morrison Academy
- Kaohsiung American School
- American School in Taichung
- Taipei Adventist American School
- Taipei European School
- Taipei Japanese School
- Taiwan Adventist International School
- The Primacy Collegiate Academy
