= The Primacy Collegiate Academy =

The Primacy Collegiate Academy 卓越大學先修學院
- 99 Meide Street, Shilin District, Taipei, Taiwan

Information
- Other name: TPCA
- Type: Private
- Denomination: Seventh Day Adventist
- Established: 2002
- Principal: Ashim Pheirim
- Grades: 9 – 12
- Enrollment: 40
- Education system: American high school education
- Language: English
- Accreditation: AdvancED / Association of Christian Schools International
- Website: primacy.org.tw

The Primacy Collegiate Academy (TPCA; Chinese: 卓越大學先修學院), formerly Taipei Adventist Preparatory Academy (TAPA), is a private international high school located in Shilin District, Taipei, Taiwan.

In 2002, Adventist College Preparatory Center (ACPC) was founded by Robert Christensen with the purpose of providing part-time English-language tutoring for high school students and college-placement assistance for students interested in attending English-speaking universities. During the first year, the school provided tutoring to 30 students and college placement to 6 students. Throughout the following years, the student population increased and, in 2005, the English-language training was eventually integrated into an American curriculum high school offering regular and Advanced Placement courses. In 2005, the academy had its first high school graduates—a class of three. In the fall of 2005, ACPC changed its name to Taipei Adventist Preparatory Academy or more commonly known as TAPA.

The Taipei Adventist Preparatory Academy continued to grow throughout the years until in 2012, it reached over 150 students representing twenty plus nationalities.

== Accreditation ==
The Primacy Collegiate Academy follows the American educational system designated for private schools. Accredited by Cognia.

== Notable people ==
- 李玉璽, Class of 2011 - Musician
- 瑞瑪·席丹 - Actress
- 蘇小軒 - Actress

== See also ==
- Taipei Adventist American School
- Taiwan Adventist International School
