= Taiwan Adventist International School =

Private school in Yuchih, Taiwan

Location
- No. 39 Chunwen Lane; Nantou County; Yuchih, 55542; Taiwan

Information
- School type: Private
- Denomination: Seventh-day Adventist
- Established: August 2008
- Chairperson: Dr. Terry Xu
- Principal: Dr. Joceyln Isabirye
- Gender: Co-educational
- Age range: 7th -12th Grade
- Enrollment: Jr. and Sr. High combined capped at 65
- Student to teacher ratio: 5 : 1
- Education system: Adventist Education (American System)
- Classes offered: American stand high school curriculum, with AP courses offered
- Language: English
- Hours in school day: 8:00AM - 5:30 PM
- Classrooms: 30+
- Campus: Located in the Campus of Taiwan Adventist College
- Campus type: Private Rural Campus
- Colours: Adventist Blue and Gold
- Accreditation: Adventist Accrediting Association / Griggs International Academy
- Website: www.tais.tw

Taiwan Adventist International School (TAIS; Chinese: 南投縣復臨國際實驗教育機構; pinyin: Nántóuxiàn Fùlín Guójì Shíyàn Jiàoyù Jīgòu) is a secondary boarding school operated by the Seventh-day Adventist Church. It is situated in the midst of rural Nantou County, Taiwan.

It is a part of the Seventh-day Adventist education system, the world's second largest Christian school system.

== History ==
Taiwan Adventist International School is a holistic boarding school operated in North Asia-Pacific Division of Seventh-day Adventists to fill the need of its constituents, missionaries' children, and local, Taiwanese who are looking for Adventist education at the junior high and high school level.

TAIS was established in 2008 by the Adventist Educational Holdings Company to serve the whole of its constituents, and named Taiwan Adventist International School. It opened in August 2008 with 11 teachers and has since grown to 24 faculty and staff. The first 12th grade graduation was in 2010.

TAIS is located on a 50-hectare (120-acre) campus in central Taiwan.

== Curriculum ==
The schools curriculum consists primarily of the standard courses taught at college preparatory schools across the world. All students are required to take classes in the core areas of English, basic sciences, mathematics, a foreign language, and social sciences. TAIS offers Advanced Placement courses based student interest.

TAIS is a Nantou County Experimental School, also carrying an accreditation in the U.S. Teaching Faculty are subject certified through accredited programs.

== Spiritual aspects ==
All students take religion classes each year that they are enrolled. These classes cover topics in biblical history and Christian and denominational doctrines. Instructors in other disciplines also begin each class period with prayer or a short devotional thought, many which encourage student input.

Weekly, the entire student body gathers together in the auditorium for chapel services. Outside the classrooms there is year-round spiritually oriented programming that relies on student involvement.

== See also ==
- List of Seventh-day Adventist secondary and elementary schools
- Seventh-day Adventist education
- Seventh-day Adventist Church
- Seventh-day Adventist theology
- History of the Seventh-day Adventist Church
- Taipei Adventist American School
