= Taipei Adventist American School =

- 台北復臨美國學校

Location
- No. 64 Lane 80, Zhuang Ding Road, Taipei 111; Taiwan
- Coordinates: 25°06′33″N 121°33′12″E

Information
- Type: Private Church-Affiliated
- Established: 1955
- Principal: Robert Johnston
- Faculty: 26
- Grades: K – 8
- Enrollment: 110
- Campus: Suburban, 8 acres (32,000 m^{2})
- Colors: Dark Blue, Dark Green, light Green
- Mascot: The Messengers
- Tuition: NT$ 440,000 for K-G4; NT$ 488,000 for G5-G8
- Website: www.taas.tw

Taipei Adventist American School (TAAS) is a private foreign-registered elementary school with an American-based curriculum located on Yangming Shan (陽明山) in the Shihlin District of Taipei City, Taiwan. It is administered under the Northern Asia-Pacific Division of the Seventh-day Adventist Church.

== History ==
Taipei Adventist American School had its beginnings in 1955 as a small home-style school for overseas missionaries of the Seventh-day Adventist Church and doctors of Taiwan Adventist Hospital who mostly came from North America to pioneer the SDA mission work in China, Hong Kong, and Taiwan.

In the early 1950's, due to China's changing political climate, missionaries for the church were forced to locate outside of the country. Many of these missionaries came to Taiwan. At the same time, the Taiwan Adventist Hospital was built with the help of the Taiwan church, Taiwan government, and the US government. This led to an influx of foreign Adventist doctors with families who wanted to serve the needs of the church in Taiwan.

At first, the school was located behind Taiwan Adventist Hospital in the basement of the dormitories used by workers of the hospital. The first teacher to serve at this location was Miss Paterson, a kind and gentle woman that the kids adored. To help support the school, the head of the Taiwan Theological Institute, Mr. Carter and Mr. Abby, their business manager, provided the day to day administrative work to keep the English Missionary School going. This home-style school provided an American education up to the eighth grade. After graduation, most students transferred to Singapore Adventist Academy in Singapore.

During this time, the school grew slowly with its students primarily being children of the doctors in the hospital, missionary families stationed in Taiwan, and some of the families of the officers of the American Military stationed in Taiwan. At this time, there was also a growing number of children of teachers from the campus of the Taiwan Theological Institute (later it was moved and renamed Taiwan Adventist College) in the Qizhang area of the Xindian district of Suburban Taipei. These kids would be driven all the way up to the hospital daily to attend classes.

Over successive remodels during the 1990s, 2000s, and 2010s, the school transformed to three levels of classrooms with grades one to four on the third floor, grades five to seven on the second floor, and eighth grade, administrative offices, work space, storage, and a technology lab on the first floor.

In 2010 and 2016, the school converted one of the compound's houses into more classroom and work space by remodeling it for Chinese and EAL classrooms, learning support offices, music rooms, and a multipurpose kitchen work space.

== Academics ==
TAAS specializes in holistic individualized American-style instruction in a way not possible in a larger school setting. As part of the Adventist education system TAAS focuses on intellectual, spiritual, physical, and social education. TAAS believes that in a smaller family-type setting with a lower student/teacher ratio that not only is learning benefited, but social development is also enhanced. In fact students consistently score 12 months or 1 grade level ahead of their American peers. Children that are part of the SDA education system become more independent and do better academically because the “teachers have higher expectations of students and encourage them to take hard classes. They are more likely to support the notion that ‘God doesn’t make junk’ and that students are often capable of achieving more than they realize."

== See also ==
- The Primacy Collegiate Academy
- Taiwan Adventist International School
