= Kaohsiung American School =

Private international school in Zuoying, Kaohsiung, Taiwan

- 高雄美國學校
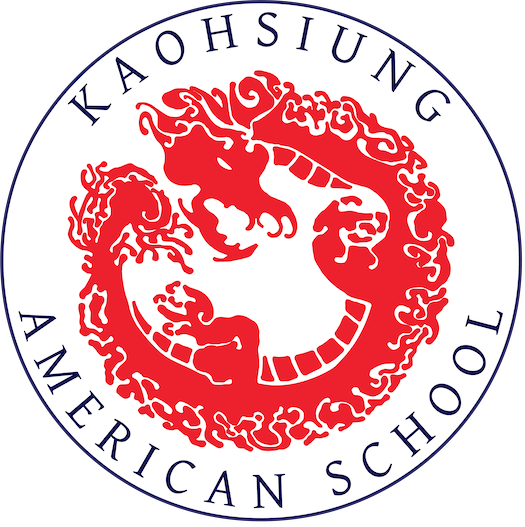

Location
- No. 889 Cueihua Road, Zuoying District, Kaohsiung, Taiwan 81354; Zuoying District, Kaohsiung; Taiwan; 22.678°N 120.298°E

Information
- Type: Private International School
- Motto: Balanced, Independent, Global (BIG)
- Established: 1989
- Head of School: Paul Ducharme
- Enrollment: 776 (August 2026)
- Colors: Red, Blue, and White
- Mascot: Dragons
- Accreditation: WASC
- Website: www.kas.tw

Kaohsiung American School (KAS; Chinese: 高雄美國學校; pinyin: Gāoxióng Měiguó Xuéxiào) is a private pre-K through 12th-grade international school in the Zuoying District of Kaohsiung, Taiwan. Established in 1989, it is an IB World School accredited by the Western Association of Schools and Colleges (WASC) and supported by the US Department of State through the American Institute in Taiwan (AIT).

== History ==
Kaohsiung American School was established in 1989 to provide an English-language education for expatriate families in southern Taiwan. It initially operated in residential quarters at the Chang Gung Hospital compound before moving to larger facilities as enrollment grew.

The school later relocated to the site of the former Sheng Li Elementary School in Zuoying District. In 2013, construction began on a new campus to accommodate expansion. The primary academic building opened in 2015, followed by the Dr. Thomas H. Farrell Athletic Complex in 2016.

== Academics and curriculum ==
KAS offers a college preparatory curriculum aligned with U.S. stateside standards, including the Common Core for English language arts, Project AERO standards for mathematics, and the Next Generation Science Standards (NGSS) for science.

The school is authorized by the International Baccalaureate (IB) to offer two academic programs:

- IB Middle Years Programme (MYP) for grades 6 through 10
- IB Diploma Programme (DP) for grades 11 and 12

High school students may also participate in the Future Leaders Program, a vocational placement initiative launched in 2020 that partners with local organizations in Kaohsiung—including the Shoushan Zoo, Brogent Technologies, and the Kaohsiung Sports Development Bureau—for up to 40 hours of mentorship and internships.

== Extracurricular activities and athletics ==
The school's athletic teams, known as the KAS Dragons, compete in regional international school conferences, including the Association of International Schools in Asia (AISA). Interscholastic sports offered at the school include basketball, volleyball, soccer, swimming, cross country, and track and field.

Non-athletic extracurricular activities include student participation in regional Model United Nations (MUN) conferences as well as competitive robotics programs.

== Campus and facilities ==
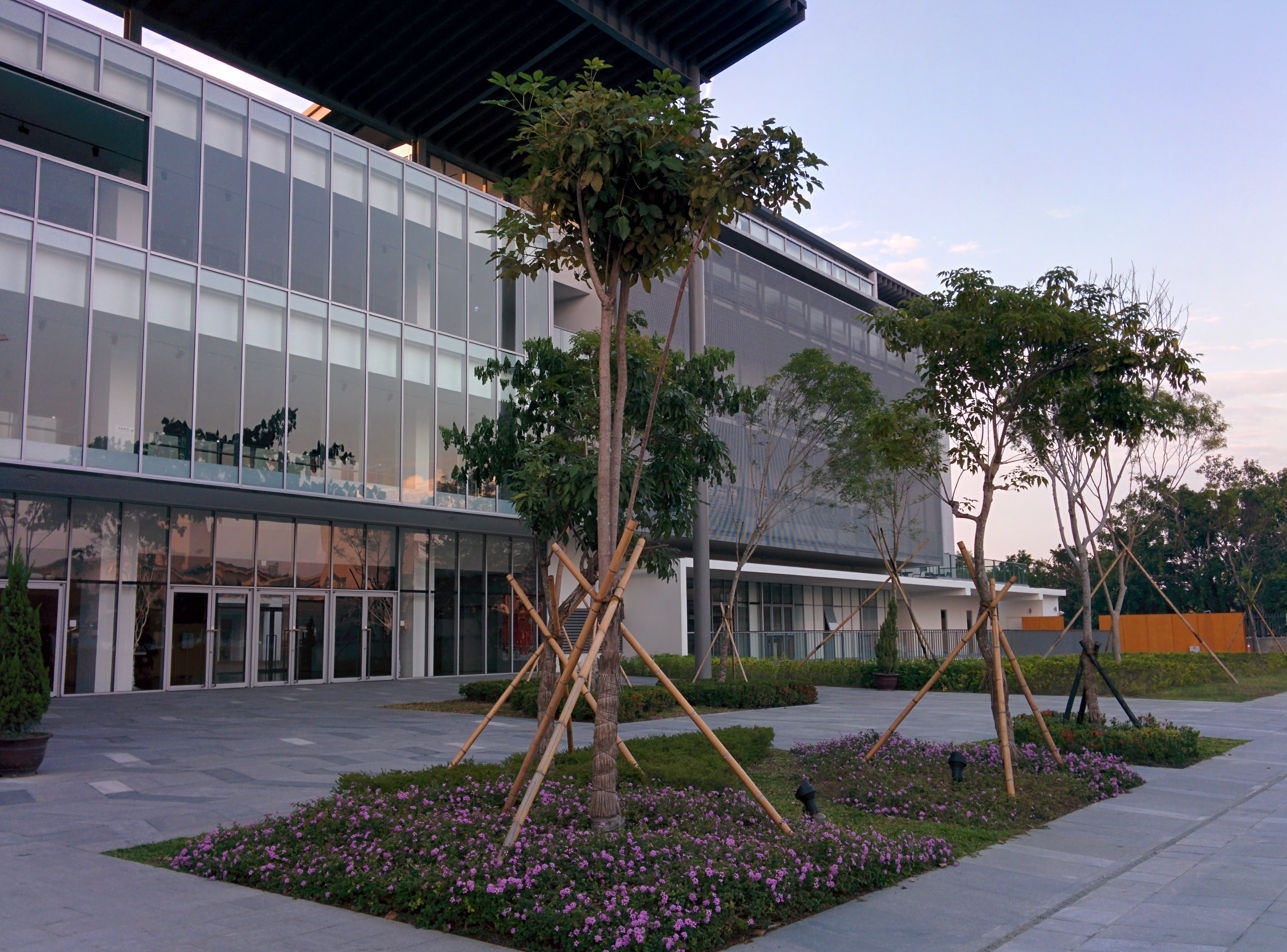
The main academic building, completed in 2015

The school's academic building was completed in 2015 and designed by MAYU architects. The structure incorporates open courtyards and interconnected spaces, designed to meet the LEED 2009 for Schools New Construction certification standard at the Silver level.

The Dr. Thomas H. Farrell Athletic Complex, opened in 2016, includes an indoor gymnasium and swimming pool, and holds LEED Gold certification.

== See also ==
- Education in Taiwan
- American Institute in Taiwan
- Taipei American School
