= Morrison Academy =

International school in Taiwan

- 馬禮遜美國學校
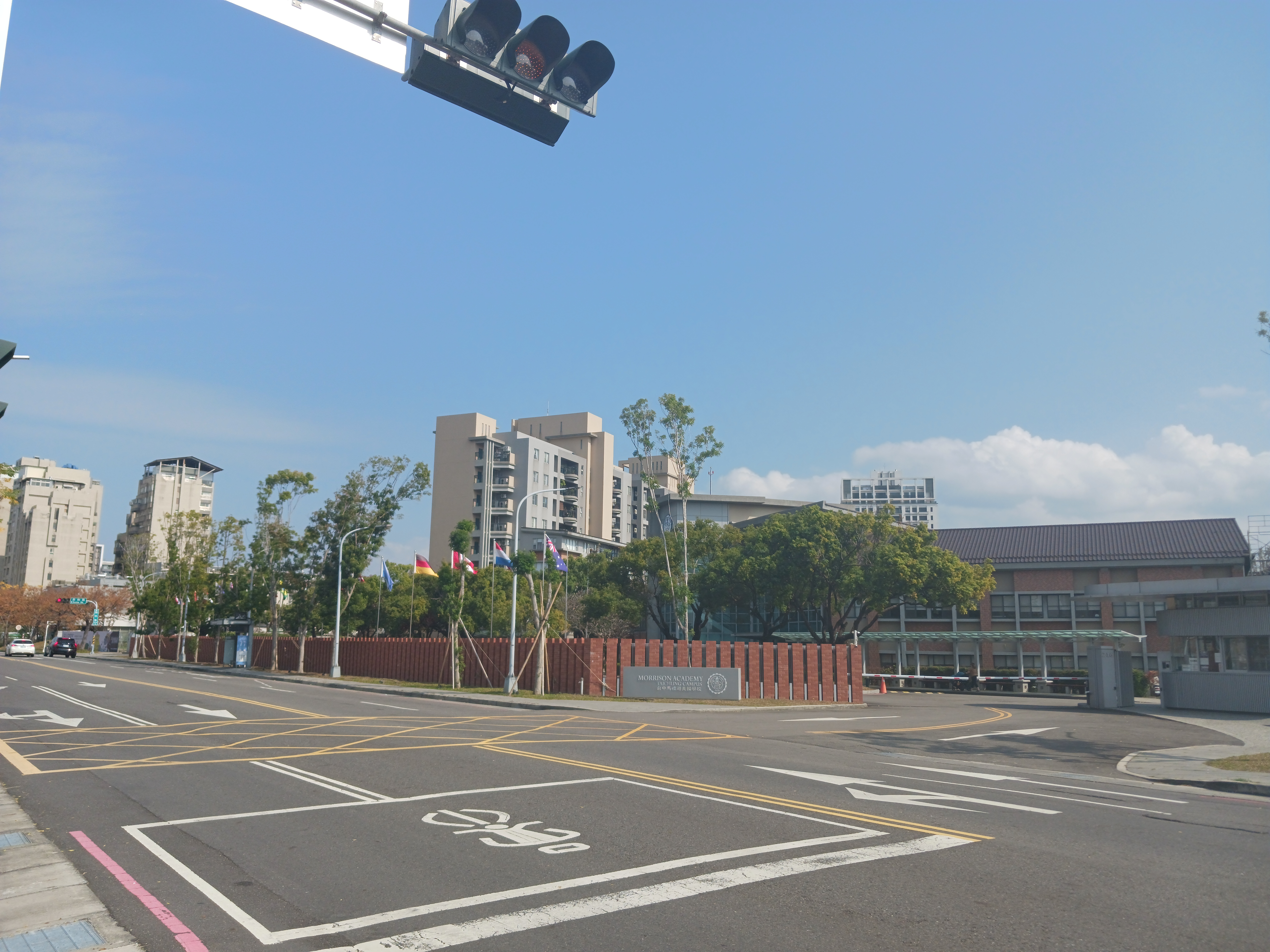

Location
- 216 Siping Rd. Taichung, Beitun District 40679; Taiwan

Information
- Type: Private Christian Conservative International school
- Motto: "Then you will know the truth, and the truth will set you free. " —- John 8:32
- Established: 1952
- Superintendent: Julie Heinsman
- Chairman: Mark Dinnage
- Principal: Christina Stowers
- Chaplain: Henry Kasonso (HS); Amy Divinagracia (MS); Rachel Sawatzky (ES)
- Faculty: 95
- Grades: K-12
- Enrollment: Approximately 360 students
- Campus: Urban
- Colors: Navy blue and white
- Mascot: Mustang
- Accreditation: ACSI, WASC
- Newspaper: The Torch
- Yearbook: Morrisonian
- Website: www.ma.org.tw

Morrison Academy (Chinese: 馬禮遜學校; pinyin: Mǎlǐxùn Xuéxiào; Wade–Giles: Ma-li-hsün Hsüeh-hsiao) is an international Christian school founded in 1952 in Taichung, Taiwan. It primarily caters to the children of missionaries. Beyond the original Taichung location it also maintains a campus in Taipei and Morrison Academy Kaohsiung in Kaohsiung; other satellite campuses have existed in the past.

Morrison Academy was named after Robert Morrison, the first Protestant missionary to China.

The school states that it teaches from a "Christian perspective" and uses an "American-based" curriculum. The medium of instruction is English.

== Curriculum ==
Morrison Academy's approach to education integrates "Biblical truth with educational knowledge". The academy teaches a Bible curriculum; other subject areas, including science and social studies, are taught to be used from a Christian perspective.

Morrison Academy teaches Earth Science, Life Science, Physical Science, and Engineering and Design in elementary middle school. In high school, the scope and sequence are Biology, Chemistry, Human Anatomy, Physical Science, Physics, AP Biology, and AP Chemistry. Morrison Academy has a "Biblical worldview." The school's science curriculum guide states that, "Morrison Academy insists that God made the universe... Science, as exemplified in the scientific method, is a process that enables all mankind to gain knowledge about creation, the laws that govern it, and the character of God."

== Views on marriage ==
Morrison Academy actively promotes the biblical belief that marriage is "the uniting of one man and one woman in a single, exclusive union" as per Genesis 2:18-25 and that sexual intimacy is "only between a man and a woman who are married to each other" as per Matthew 19:4-6. Although Morrison Academy emphasizes marriage, divorce is not automatic grounds for job termination.

== Sports ==
Morrison Academy's sports teams compete in the Asian Christian Schools Conference in basketball, in the Far East High School Girls Division II Volleyball Tournament which they won in 2011 and 2012, and in the TAS Tigersharks Invitational Swim.

== Notable alumni ==
- Joy Burke (born 1990), professional basketball player
- Katharine Gun (born 1974), former translator for British intelligence and whistleblower.
- Freya Lim (born 1979), singer.
- David Tao (born 1969), singer-songwriter.

== Gallery ==
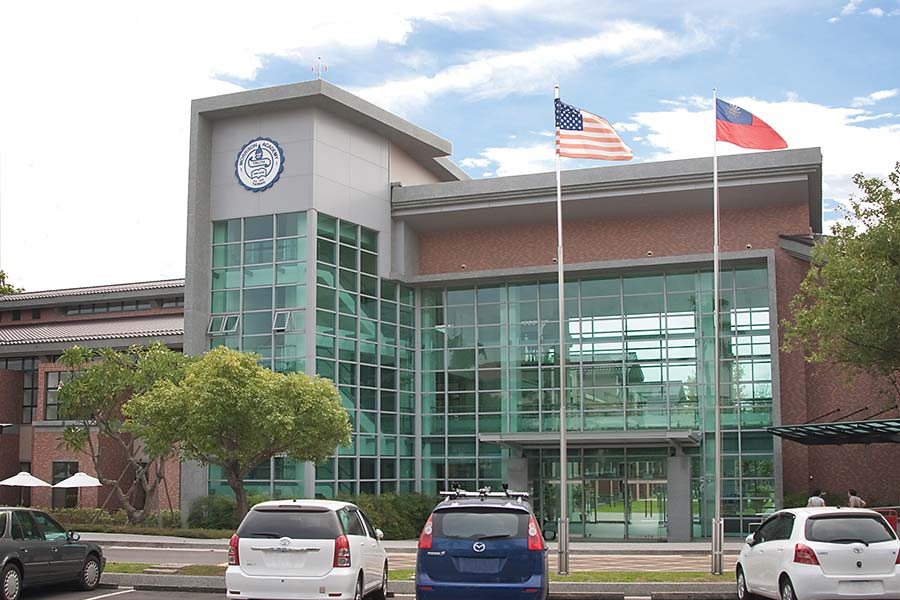
Main entrance of campus

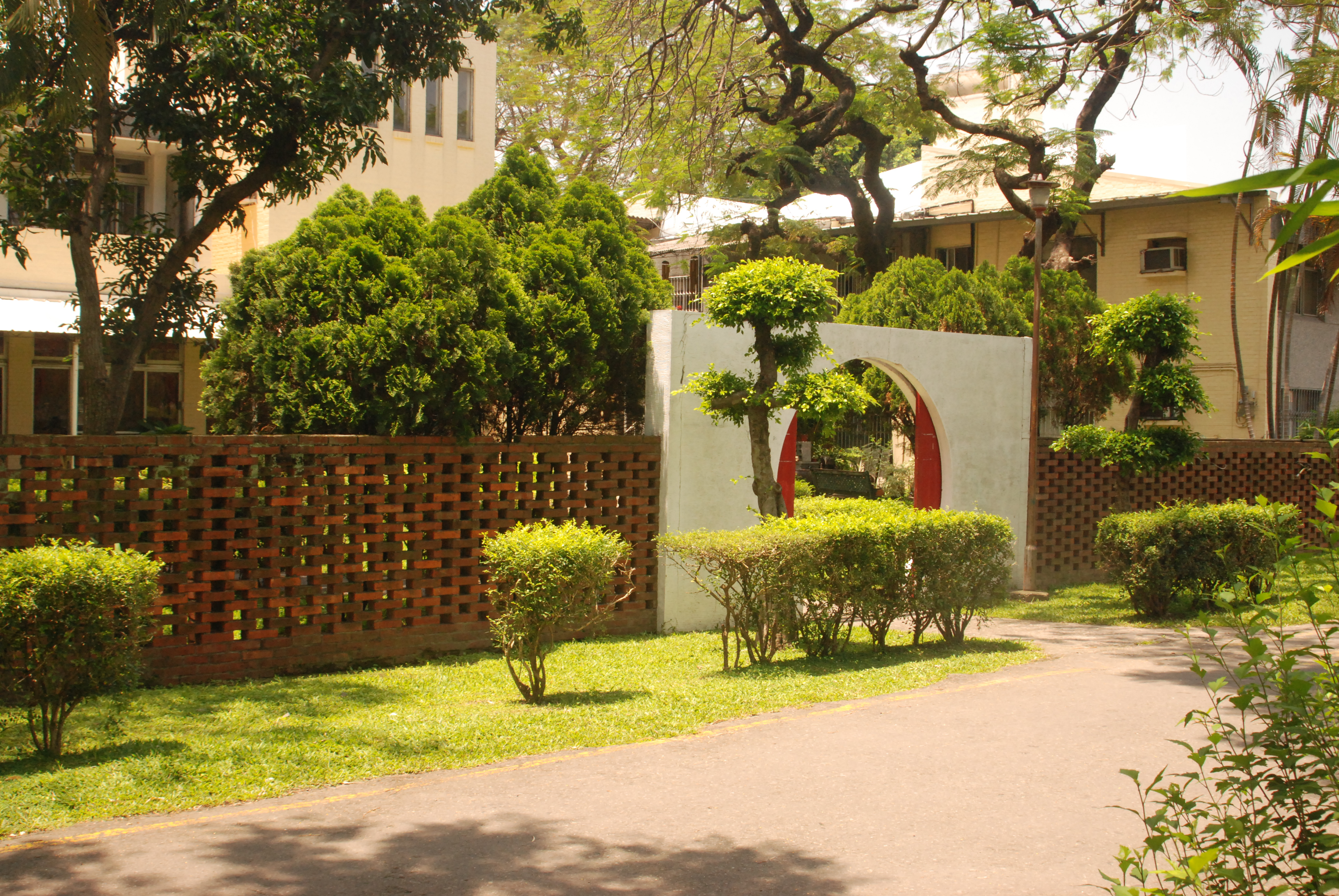
Moon Gate and the entrance to the old dorms in the Taichung campus
