= Xiu =

Xiu can refer to:

== People ==
- Cao Xiu (Chinese: 曹休), Cao Wei military general
- Xiu Deshun (Chinese: 修德顺), Chinese chess grandmaster
- Xiu Fujin, Chinese politician
- Han Xiu (Chinese: 韩休; 672–739), Tang dynasty politician
- He Xiu (Han dynasty) (Chinese: 何休; 129–182), Han dynasty scholar
- He Xiu (Qing dynasty) (Chinese: 何琇), Qing dynasty scholar
- Li Xiu (Chinese: 李秀; 291–???), Jin dynasty military commander
- Xiu Lijuan (Chinese: 修丽娟; born 1957), Chinese basketball player
- Liu Xiu (Chinese: 劉秀), personal name of Emperor Guangwu of Han (5 BC – AD 57)
- Ouyang Xiu (Chinese: 歐陽修), Song dynasty historian, calligrapher, epigrapher, poet, and politician
- Pei Xiu (Chinese: 裴秀; 224–271), Cao Wei cartographer
- Pei Xiu (Tang dynasty) (Chinese: 裴休; 791–864), Tang dynasty politician, literary figure, and Buddhist intellectual
- Sun Xiu (Chinese: 孫休; 235–264), third emperor of the state of Eastern Wu
- Sun Xiu (Jin dynasty) (Chinese: 孫秀; died 301), Jin dynasty official
- Teng Xiu (Chinese: 滕脩; died 288), Eastern Wu military general
- Wang Xiu (Han dynasty) (Chinese: 王脩; fl. 190s–210s), Eastern Han politician
- Xiang Xiu (Chinese: 向秀), Chinese writer
- Xiao Xiu (Chinese: 蕭秀), younger half-brother of the first Liang dynasty emperor
- Yan Xiu (Chinese: 嚴修; 1860–1929), Chinese educator
- Yang Xiu (Han dynasty) (Chinese: 楊修; 175–219), Eastern Han official
- Yang Xiu (Sui dynasty) (Chinese: 楊秀; 570s – c. 618), Sui dynasty prince
- Yuan Xiu (Chinese: 元脩), personal name of Emperor Xiaowu of Northern Wei (510–535)
- Xiong Xiu (Chinese: 熊繡), Ming dynasty politician
- Xiu Zelan (Chinese: 修澤蘭; 1925–2016), Taiwanese architect
- Zhang Xiu (Eastern Wu) (Chinese: 張休; c.205–245), Eastern Wu military general
- Zhang Xiu (warlord) (Chinese: 張繡; died 207), Eastern Han warlord
- Zhao Xiu (Chinese: 赵修; 1921–1992), Chinese politician
- Zheng Xiu, queen consort of King Huai of Chu

== Other uses ==
- Lady Xiu (Chinese: 女脩), figure in Chinese mythology
- Shi Xiu (Chinese: 石秀), fictional character in Water Margin
- Xiu.com, Chinese e-commerce website
- Xiu Prefecture, ancient prefecture in modern-day Jiaxing city, Zhejiang, China
- XIU (iShares S&P/TSX 60 Index ETF), Canadian exchange-traded fund offered by BlackRock
- Xiu (宿), term for one of the Twenty-Eight Mansions in Chinese astronomy

== See also ==
- Tutul-Xiu, Mayan chiefdom in the Yucatán Peninsula from 1441 to 1547
- Xiu Xiu (disambiguation)
