= National Huwei Senior High School =

Public high school in Huwei, Yunlin, Taiwan

Coordinates: 23°42′40″N 120°26′32″E

- 國立虎尾高級中學
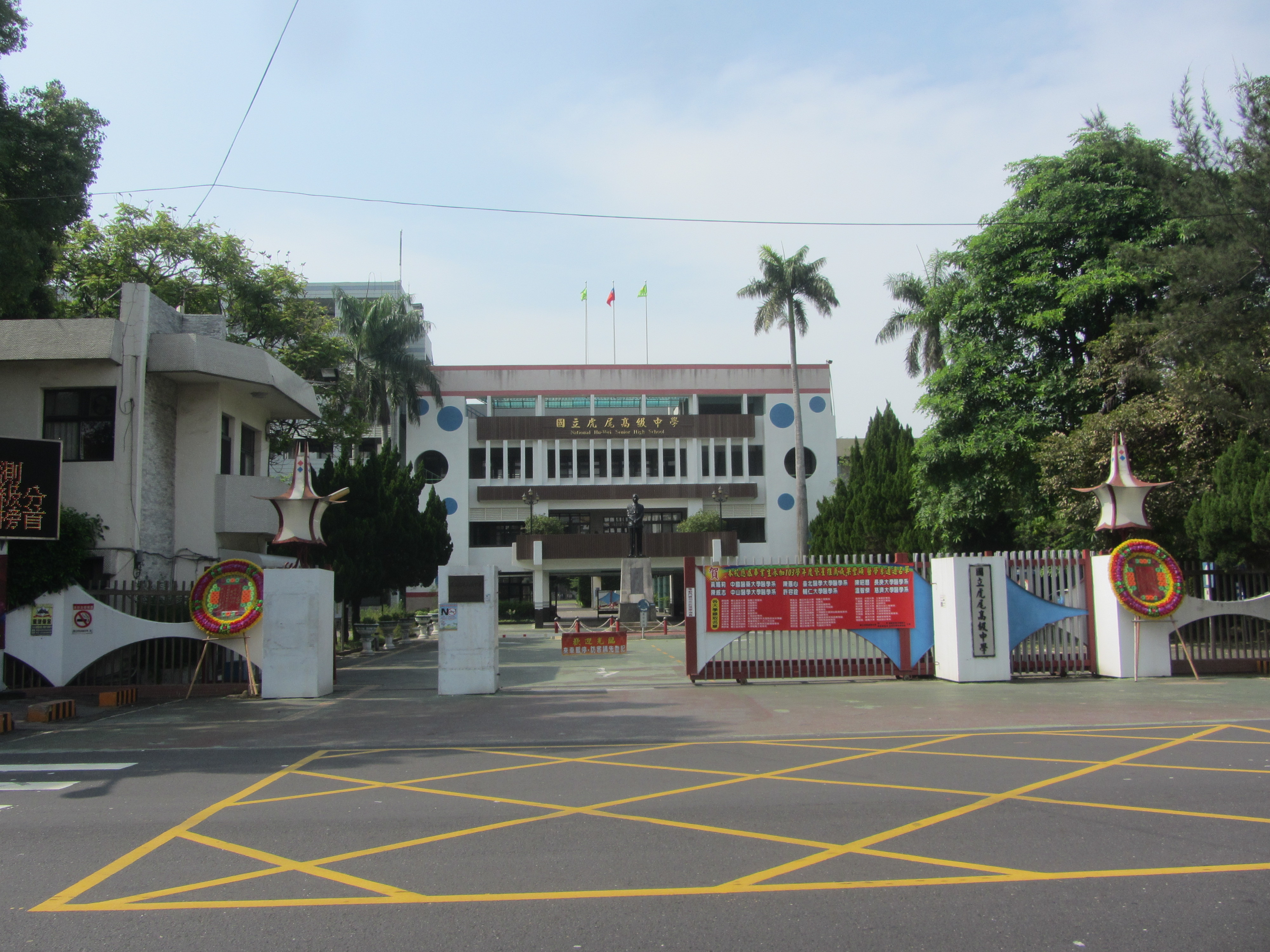
- Entrance of Huwei High School

Location
- No. 222, Guangfu Road, Huwei Township, Yunlin County; Huwei, Yunlin County, Taiwan; 632302

Information
- School type: National General Senior High School
- Motto: 公、誠、勤、正 (Justice, Sincerity, Diligence, Righteousness)
- Established: Huwei Home Economics Girls' School: 1939; Huwei Girls' High School: 1940; Huwei Provincial Junior High School: 1946
- President: Chen, Hui-chen (2020 - )
- Staff: 20
- Teaching staff: 105
- Grades: Three-year system, from Grade 10 to Grade 12
- Classes: 42
- Area: 7.344 ha
- Newspaper: 《虎溪》
- Students: 1359
- Website: https://www.hwsh.ylc.edu.tw/

National Huwei Senior High School (Chinese: 國立虎尾高級中學, abbreviated as Huwei Senior High School) is a public general high school located in Huwei Township, Yunlin County, Taiwan, under the administration of the K-12 Education Administration. It operates as a three-year community high school, offering programs in sports, mathematics and science class, and general education.

Today's Huwei High School was formed in 1979 by the merger of Huwei High School (a boys' school) with Provincial Huwei Girls’ High School, maintaining the original name, Taiwan Provincial Huwei Senior High School, and relocating to the former Huwei Girls' High School campus. Huwei Girls' High School was once famous for its unique campus landscape, with some buildings designed by Taiwan's first female architect, Xiu Zelan. It was popularly known as "North Jimei, South Hu-Girls." In 2000, following the streamlining of the provincial government, it came under the Ministry of Education and adopted its current name.

== History ==
=== Under Japanese rule ===
During the Japanese colonial period, the Huwei Agricultural Vocational School (after World War II was changed to the Tainan County Huwei Junior Agricultural School or National Huwei Agricultural and Industrial High School) was established as a boys' school. Considering the lack of educational facilities for girls, the three-year Tainan Prefecture Huwei Home Economics Girls' School, the first girls' school in Huwei District, was established in 1939, during the Showa era. This school is recognized as the precursor to Huwei High School. At that time, the school had no dedicated buildings and temporarily borrowed classrooms from Huwei Ordinary High School (now Anqing Elementary School), with Principal Nakata Yoshio serving concurrently as the acting principal. Later, a school building was constructed north of the Huwei Ordinary High School. In 1941, the school was renamed Huwei Agricultural Practical Girls' School. Due to its proximity to the Huwei Sugar Factory, the school was affected by Allied bombings toward the end of World War II. After the war, the principal returned to Japan, and the school was renamed Tainan County Huwei Junior Girls' Vocational School, under the administration of the Tainan County Government.

=== Huwei Junior High School ===
Following the Republic of China’s takeover of Taiwan, prominent local figures, including Hwang Tzongy, Dr. Huang Qi, Hwang Kuochun, Wang Biao, Yan Xinhou, Fang Ruiyu, and Wang Laose, recognizing the absence of a general middle school in the Huwei area, planned to convert Tainan County Huwei Junior Agricultural School (now National Huwei Agricultural & Industrial Vocational Senior High School) into a junior high school with a general education department, using the former Huwei Ordinary High School campus. With the approval of the county magistrate, Yuan Guoqin, and led by Huwei Agricultural School Principal Wang Anshun, the school enrolled nearly 400 students. However, the Taiwan Provincial Administrative Executive Office's Department of Education, noting that China was an agriculturally-based nation, determined that it was inappropriate to close the agricultural school. Consequently, a separate junior high school was established.

On April 20, 1946, Tainan County Huwei Junior High School (abbreviated as Huwei Junior High) was established at the former campus of Huwei Elementary School, becoming the first boys' middle school in the area. Liao Kun-jin was appointed as the acting principal. Subsequently, Huwei Junior High incorporated the nearby Tainan County Huwei Junior Girls' Vocational School, establishing separate departments for boys and girls.

=== Structure ===
In August 1949, the Taiwan Provincial Department of Education merged Huwei Junior High School and the nearby Taiwan Provincial Huwei Girls' High School, forming the "Taiwan Provincial Huwei High School." Chen Dongrong, the principal of Huwei Girls' High School, was appointed principal, with the original Huwei Girls' High School serving as the main campus and girls' division, while the original Huwei Junior High School became the boys' division, headed by Liu Kegang as branch director. In August 1950, the Department of Education separated the two due to the distance between the boys' and girls' divisions, re-establishing the main campus as "Taiwan Provincial Huwei Girls' High School," with Chen Dongrong returning as principal. The boys' division was then set up independently as "Taiwan Provincial Huwei High School" (known as Provincial Huwei High), with Ling Xiaofen as principal.

During his tenure, Ling Xiaofen recruited esteemed scholars from mainland China to teach. To clarify property ownership, he communicated with various institutions, including Huwei Girls' High and the township office. Ling resigned in 1954, becoming a specialized commissioner for the Ministry of Education. The position of principal of Provincial Huwei High was then assumed by Jin Shurong, who was previously the principal of the Taichung Municipal Taichung First High School. After one year, Jin transferred to Taiwan Provincial Pingtung High School, and Xu Tianzhi, formerly principal of National Chao-Chou Senior High School, took over as principal of Provincial Huwei High in August 1962. However, due to declining enrollment, Provincial Huwei High reduced its classes, and the early "recommended admission quotas" were gradually phased out.

In August 1965, the Provincial Department of Education appointed Tan Dida, former principal of Tainan County Zengwen High School (now Municipal Madouguomin Junior High School), as principal of Provincial Huwei High. During his tenure, Tan compiled the school's rules and regulations into a handbook, establishing the school motto "Justice, Sincerity, Diligence, and Righteousness." In 1968, Provincial Huwei High School established the "Taiwan Provincial Huwei High School Siluo Branch" (canceled the following year and merged into Siluo Agricultural Industrial High School). In line with the new "Provincial Senior High, County, and Municipal Junior High" policy, the school ceased junior high enrollment in 1968 and was renamed "Taiwan Provincial Huwei Senior High School." At the Ministry of Education's request, the school briefly offered two sessions of "Open Supplementary School."

In November 1972, the Department of Education appointed Li Shikun as the new principal of Provincial Huwei High. Li organized alumni, including teachers Lin Jiuhua and Li Chaomao, as well as the long-serving teacher Chen Shusheng, to establish the "Provincial Huwei High School Alumni Million Dollar Scholarship," (Note: In Chinese: 省立虎尾中學校友百萬獎學金.) with Lin Jiuhua and others being recognized in the first "Fragrant Records of the Teaching Garden" (Note: In Chinese: 杏壇芬芳錄.) published by the Department of Education. During this period, rural depopulation significantly affected student enrollment. The Department of Education proposed turning Provincial Huwei High into a vocational high school or technical senior high school, but Li opposed this, believing in maintaining a general high school curriculum. He suggested merging Huwei Girls' High with Provincial Huwei High, given both schools' declining enrollments. In 1979, the Department of Education accepted this proposal and, on May 3, issued a directive that the two schools be merged starting in the 1979-1980 school year (August 1979 to July 1980). In August 1979, the two schools formally merged, with Huwei Girls' High ceasing enrollment and Provincial Huwei High admitting both boys and girls. Li served as the acting principal of the newly merged school, which was located on the former Huwei Girls' High campus. In 1981, the original Provincial Huwei High campus was converted into the Yunlin Institute of Technology, now the National Huwei University of Science and Technology, while the school continued under the name "Taiwan Provincial Huwei Senior High School."

Following the merger, Li Shikun remained principal and appointed Dean Lin Jiuhua to oversee the construction of the faculty dormitory, "Hongdao New Village," adjacent to the new campus (the former Huwei Girls' High campus). In August 1985, Li retired upon reaching the age limit, and Taiwan Book Store Manager Cai Jinchong succeeded him as principal of Provincial Huwei High. During his tenure, Cai built a science building, a social sciences building, and a second gymnasium (now the school gymnasium). He transferred to become principal of Taichung Second High in August 1992. The position was then filled by Chen Longxiong, who initiated construction of a five-story male dormitory, Jinzhu Hall, and a multi-functional complex that included an indoor swimming pool and volleyball courts while also landscaping the campus. In February 1998, Chen retired, and Huang Qingjiang, who had previously taught history at Huwei Girls' High, became principal.

On February 1, 2000, following the streamlining of the Taiwan Provincial Government, the school was renamed "National Huwei Senior High School" under the Ministry of Education's jurisdiction. Chen Longxiong resumed the principal role in 2006, retiring in 2009. Yang Haosen, former dean of student affairs at National Hsi-Hu High School, was selected to succeed him, becoming the youngest principal in the school's history at age 41. In August 2016, Yang transferred to become principal of Hsi-Hu High, and Xue Dongbu, former principal of National Magong High School, became the principal of Huwei High.

In August 2020, Xue Dongbu transferred to National Pai-Ho Senior Vocational High School, and Chen Huizhen, former principal of National Hsin-Feng High School, assumed the role of principal at Huwei High.

== Principals ==
The following is a list of past principals of Huwei High School, along with their dates of appointment and departure:

Tenure	Name	Appointment Date	Departure Date
Principal of Tainan County Huwei Junior High School
1	Liao Kunjin (廖昆金)	April 1946	August 1949
Principal of Taiwan Provincial Huwei High School (First Merger Period)
1	Cheng Dongrong (陳東榮) (Note: Director of the Boys' School: Liu Ke-gang)	August 1949	August 1950
Principal of Taiwan Provincial Huwei High School (Boys' School Period)
2	Ling Xiaofen (凌孝芬)	August 1950	August 1954
3	Jin Shurong (金樹榮)	August 1954	August 1955
4	Xin Xianchun (辛仙椿)	August 1955	August 1962
5	Xu Tianzhi (徐天秩)	August 1962	August 1965
6	Tan Dida (譚地大)	August 1965	November 15, 1972
7	Li Shikun (李士崑)	November 1972	July 1981
Principal of Taiwan Provincial Huwei High School (Co-ed Period)
1	Li Shikun (李士崑)	August 1981	August 1985
2	Cai Jinzhong (蔡錦忠)	August 1985	August 1992
3	Chen Longxiong (陳龍雄)	August 1992	February 1998
4	Huang Qingjian (黃清江)	February 1998	February 2000
國立虎尾高級中學校長
4	Huang Qingjian (黃清江)	February 2000	February 2006
5	Chen Huizhen (陳龍雄)	February 2006	August 2009
6	Yang Haosen (楊豪森)	August 2009	July 2016
7	Xue Dongbu (薛東埠)	July 2016	August 2020
8	Chen Huizhen (陳惠珍)	August 2020	Present

== Organization ==
The school is a three-year general senior high school, offering programs in general subjects, physical education, and a specialized math and science program. In the 108th academic year (August 2019 to July 2020), the school enrolled a total of 1,448 students.

=== School symbols ===
==== Motto and vision ====
The school motto, established by Principal Tan Dida, is “Justice, Sincerity, Diligence, Righteousness.” The school's vision was later defined as “Quality, Innovation, Competitiveness, and Macro-vision.”

==== School song ====
After Huwei Boys' and Girls' High Schools merged in 1981, the principal at that time, Li Shikun, advocated for a new school song, which was composed by He Zhihao and retired teacher Liao Xingzhang. However, the new song met with resistance from students, and subsequent compositions also failed to gain acceptance, leading the school to continue using the original Huwei High School song. In 2016, both the original girls' and boys' school songs were still sung during assemblies and alumni gatherings. The boys' school song has a more neutral melody, while the girls' song is higher-pitched and softer in tone. When Principal Xue Dongbu took office as the school's seventh principal, he admitted that even after three years, he hadn't yet learned the girls' song.

When Tainan County Huwei Junior High School was established in 1946, a song for the sports meet was created by teacher Huang Chuanxin and composed by Liao Xingzhang. Liao, a native of Lunbei Township, Yunlin, had studied music in Japan. In 1950, the Taiwan Provincial Department of Education, acknowledging that a school song was a symbol of cultural education, issued a notice requiring each school to establish its own song. Consequently, in 1951, Taiwan Provincial Huwei High School established its official school song, with lyrics by teacher Fang Lian and music by Liao Xing-zhang. Fang Lian, who hailed from Tongcheng County, Anhui Province, had studied law and politics at Waseda University and was well-versed in literature, phonetics and prosody. The song begins with the line “Vast sea and sky, the beautiful scenery of the treasure island,” (Note: In Chinese: 海天縹緲，寶島風光好.) and is set in D major with a 4/4 time signature. The song spans a major tenth (from middle D to high F♯) and consists of 49 classical Chinese characters, all rhyming with "ao".

==== School Bell ====
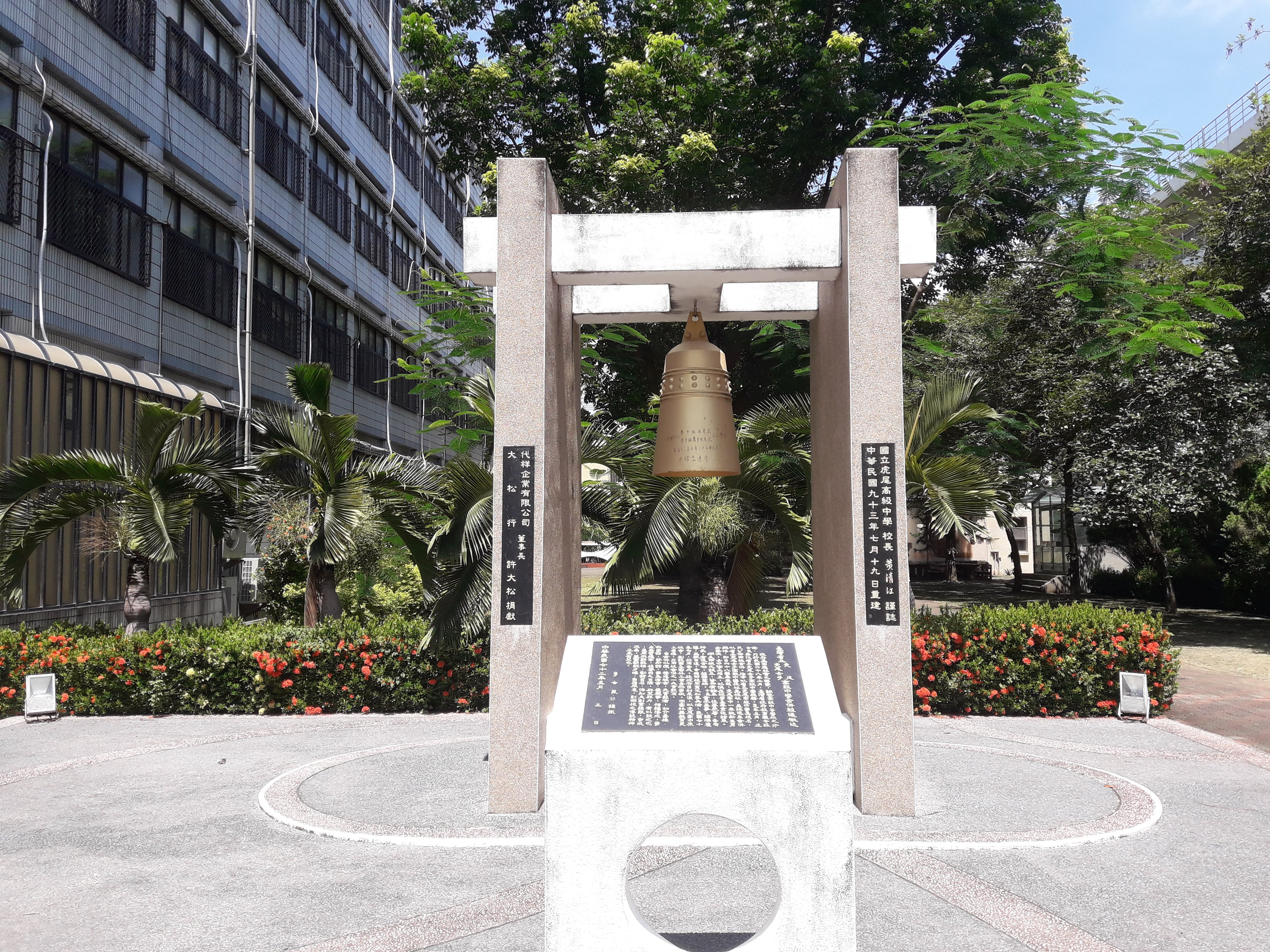
Tiger bell.

To commemorate the merger with Huwei Girls' High School, Huwei High School commissioned a replica ancient bronze bell, funded by parents including Li Lianzhong. This bell was designated as the school's bell and named "Tiger Bell," with its bell tower located in front of the library. Later, the library collapsed in the 1999 Jiji earthquake, and during its reconstruction, the bell tower was dismantled. The school lacked funding to rebuild it, so the bell was stored in a warehouse. In 2004, during the principal tenure of Huang Qingjiang, the guidance director at the time of the merger, a new bell tower, identical in appearance, was built with funding from parent advisor Xu Dasong and relocated between Jieshou Building and the library.

=== Admission and class allocation ===
When Taiwanese high schools used the basic competence test scores of junior high school students as the basis for admission, Huwei High School experienced significant variation in admission scores, ranging from PR70 to 99. Therefore, ability-based class allocation was implemented. After educational reforms in the 2010s, the school adopted a non-exam admission policy. In 2019, the minimum admission score for the school's "Non-Exam Admission Priority Order" exceeded that of another local public high school, National Tou-Liu Senior High School, which only offered a general program, marking it as the highest in Yunlin County (77.5 points, with a maximum of 90 points). A total of 492 students were admitted, including 81 students who achieved 5A or above in the junior high school education examination.

Huwei High School has 14 classes in each grade and has received approval from the Ministry of Education's National and Pre-school Education Administration to establish sports classes, advanced science and mathematics classes, and general programs.

== Classes ==
Huwei High School is a community high school, aiming for "academic advancement" as its development goal. The school was the first in the Republic of China to establish a TEAL (Technology Enabled Active Learning) creative interactive teaching classroom, in collaboration with National Chung Cheng University. The facilities are modeled after those at the Massachusetts Institute of Technology and utilize technology and multimedia teaching.

In 2014, Huwei High School mandated that first-year students take a second foreign language, choosing between German and Japanese. The school's German instruction is promoted by teachers Xu Youna and invited teacher Xu Qiongwen, with German courses included in Taiwan's Advanced Placement courses.

In response to the Twelve-Year National Education Curriculum Guidelines (Curriculum 108), the required courses for new students enrolled in the 108th academic year at Huwei High School are "Discovering Yunlin · International Integration" and "Expression Training." The former integrates English language and geography to deepen understanding of local customs, while the latter trains students in effective expression.

== Activities ==
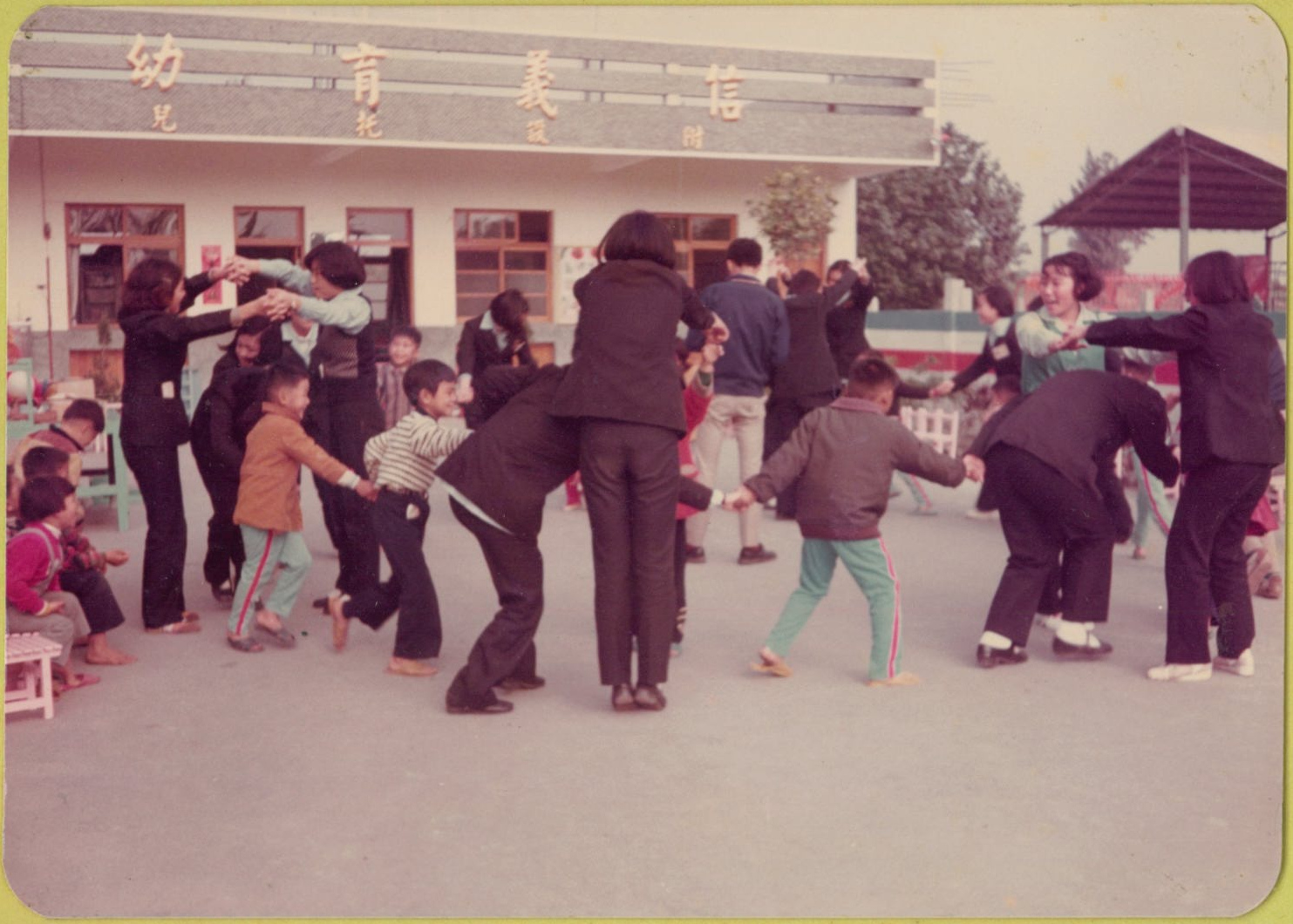
In the 1980s, Huwei High School's Ciguang Society served at the Xinyi Children's Home.

During the tenure of Principal Yang Haosen (early 2010s), the hours from 5 PM to 7 PM were designated for student sports and club activities, during which students actively participated. Popular clubs included the "Blue Shirt Tiger" alumni service team, Scout club, Ciguang Society, Chunhui Society, Huaxin Society, and various service-oriented clubs. The "Blue Shirt Tiger" is an alumni group that frequently returns to serve and organize camps for nearby junior high schools.

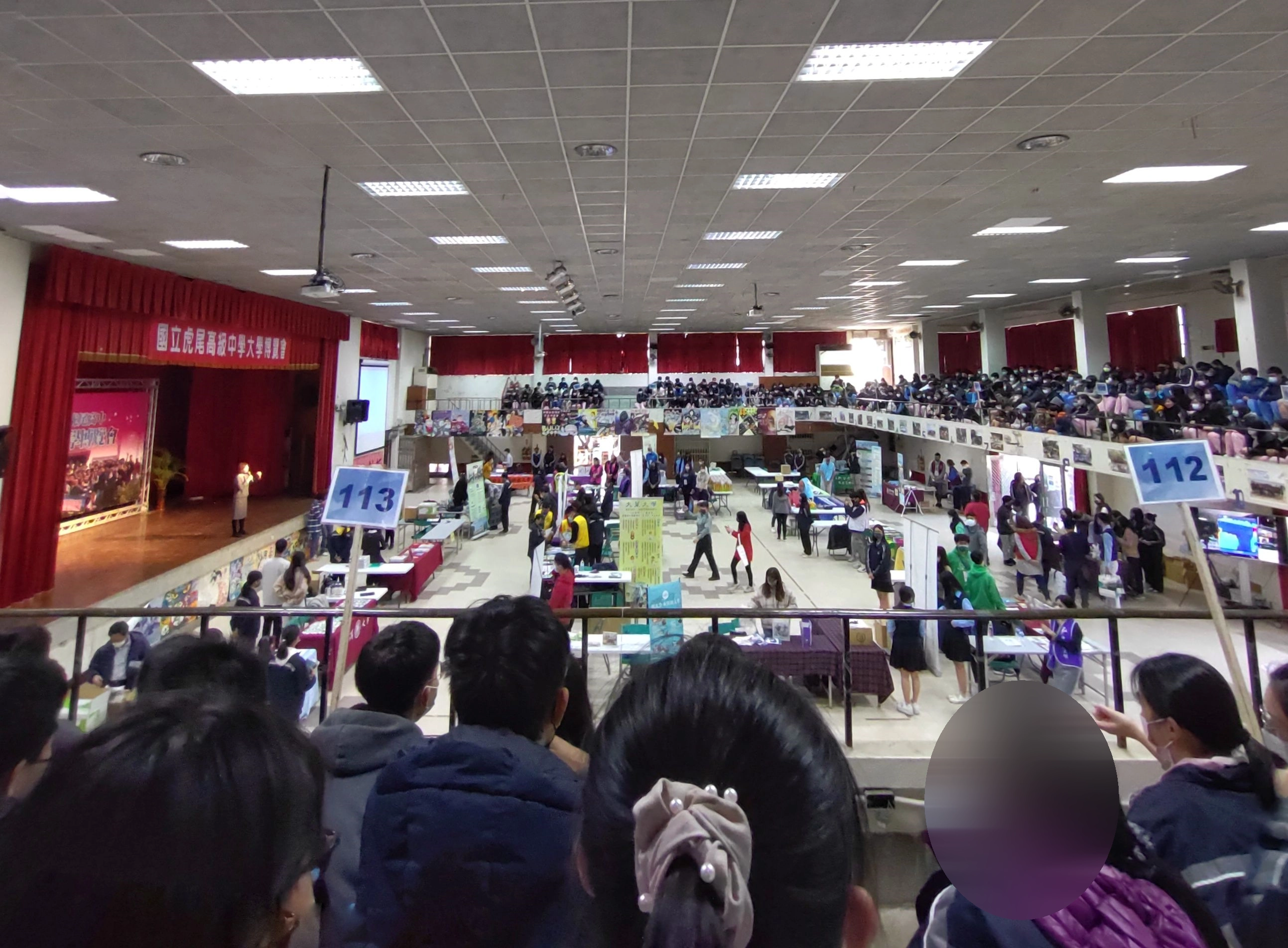
University Fair in 2022.

After the university subject ability test scores were released, Huwei High School organized a "University Fair" to help students understand the university environment, admission procedures, and appropriate choices for their preferences. The fair invited high school and junior high school students from Yunlin County to visit, allowing junior high students to get an early glimpse of high school life.

Huwei High School offers a sports class, and general program students can also participate in the school sports teams. However, in July 2021, the non-governmental organization "Taiwan Youth Association for Democracy" raised concerns about administrative injustice and potential violations of student rights by the school's sports coaches.

== Campus environment ==
The current location of Huwei High School was the original site of Huwei Girls' High School. In the 1950s, Huwei Girls' High School was famous throughout Taiwan for its picturesque campus landscape, with people noting, "Jingmei in the North, Huwei in the South" (with "Jingmei" referring to Jingmei Girls' High School). The overall planning and design of the campus were primarily executed by architect Xiu Zelan. Successive principals have also placed great emphasis on beautifying and greening the campus and the layout of the school buildings.

=== Armillary sphere ===
The armillary sphere, located in front of Jieshou Building, cost over a million New Taiwan Dollars to construct and is also known as "Flying Dragon in the Sky." This armillary sphere can rotate and is used for observation; it is a Ming Dynasty replica modeled after the Yuan Dynasty design, composed of three rings: the Six Harmonies Instrument, Three Stars Instrument, and Four Moves Instrument.

The original site of the armillary sphere was previously occupied by a statue of former Republic of China President Chiang Kai-shek, established during the tenure of Huwei Girls' High School Principal Shih Wan-chu in 1976. In early 2017, Huwei High School dismantled the statue, citing that it was severely damaged and posed safety hazards. This action coincided with the Tsai Ing-wen administration of the Democratic Progressive Party, which promoted the second de-Chiang Kai-shek movement, leading some to perceive it as a political intrusion into the campus; the school responded that it was merely coincidental.

==== Cherry Blossom path ====
Two rows of Indian cherry trees planted in front of Jieshou Building are among the most popular campus attractions among students.

=== Buildings ===
The current site of Huwei High School was originally Huwei Girls' High School, and some buildings on campus date back to the time of Girls School. In the early 1960s, the campus planning was executed by "Taiwan's first female architect," Xiu Zelan, and buildings such as Hongjiao Building (completed in 1962 and inaugurated by then Minister of Education Yen Chen-hsing) and Lixue Building (completed in 1964) were all designed by her.

The gymnasium, "Jin Ying Hall," can accommodate 2,500 people. It was inaugurated on October 30, 1968, in memory of the school principal, Cao Jinying, who died in the school the previous June, thus named Jin Ying Hall. At the time of completion, it was the largest gymnasium in Yunlin County.

The original library building was constructed in 1956 and was rebuilt after being damaged in the 921 earthquake, also known as the "Teaching Resources Building." The floor area is approximately 1,200 ping (about 4,000 square meters). The basement level has a conference hall that can accommodate 230 people. The first floor serves as an arts center, featuring the "Tiger Plaza" and "Dixin Garden." The second and third floors house the library, while the fourth floor contains two information technology classrooms.

The Health and Sports Building was newly constructed in 2007 and features classrooms for sports classes and a weight training room. In front of the building are two walls; one bears the phrase "Seize the day," meaning to "grasp the present," allowing students who achieve full scores in the university subject ability test to leave their handprints on the wall. The other wall is titled "Applause," featuring handprints of those who excel in external sports competitions. Huwei High School also utilizes vacant classrooms to establish a K-book center, "Li Yan Xuan," with a total of 210 seats for student use.

Buildings of National Huwei Senior High School

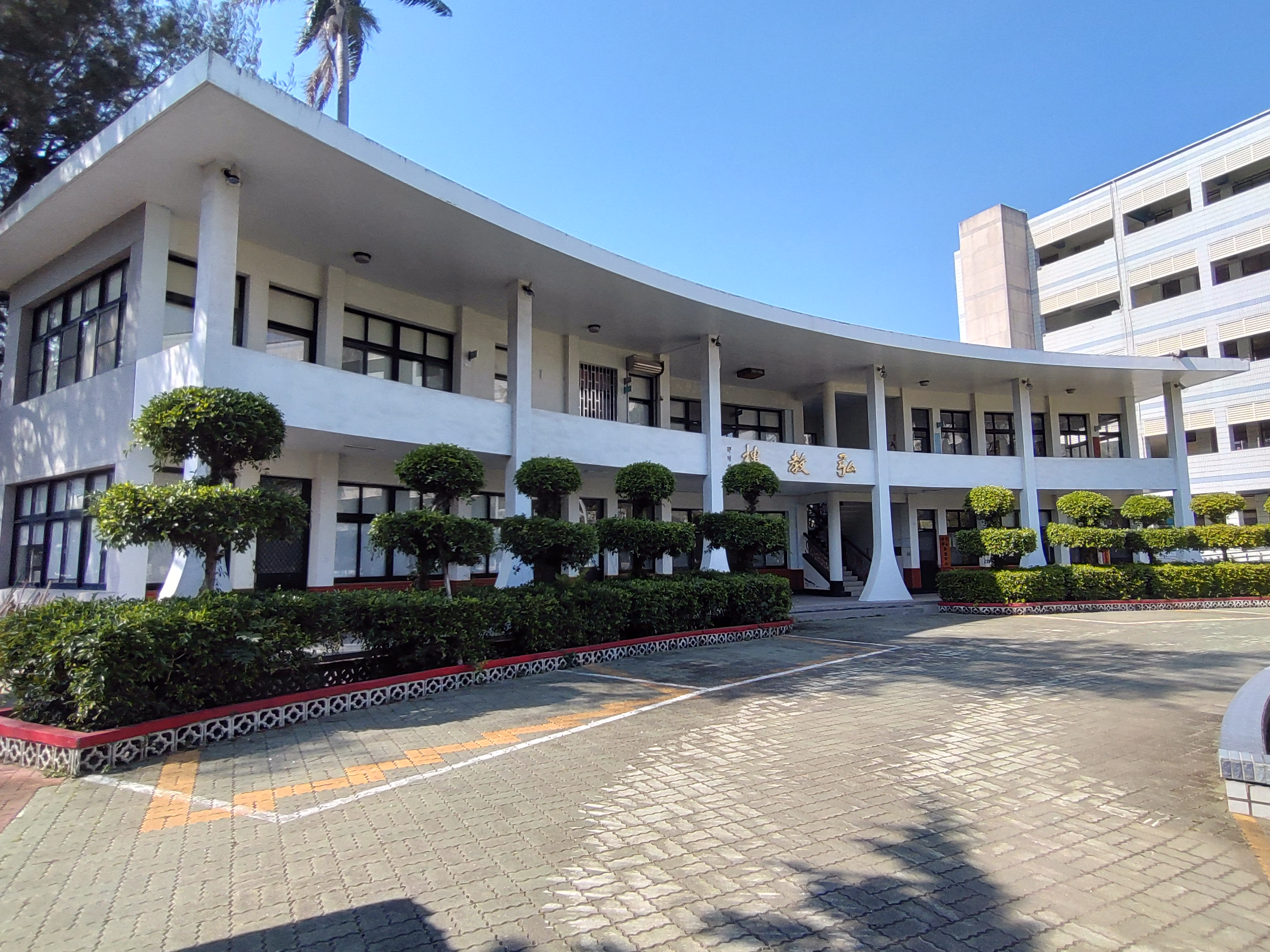
Hongjiao Building (built in 1962, two-story arc-shaped building).

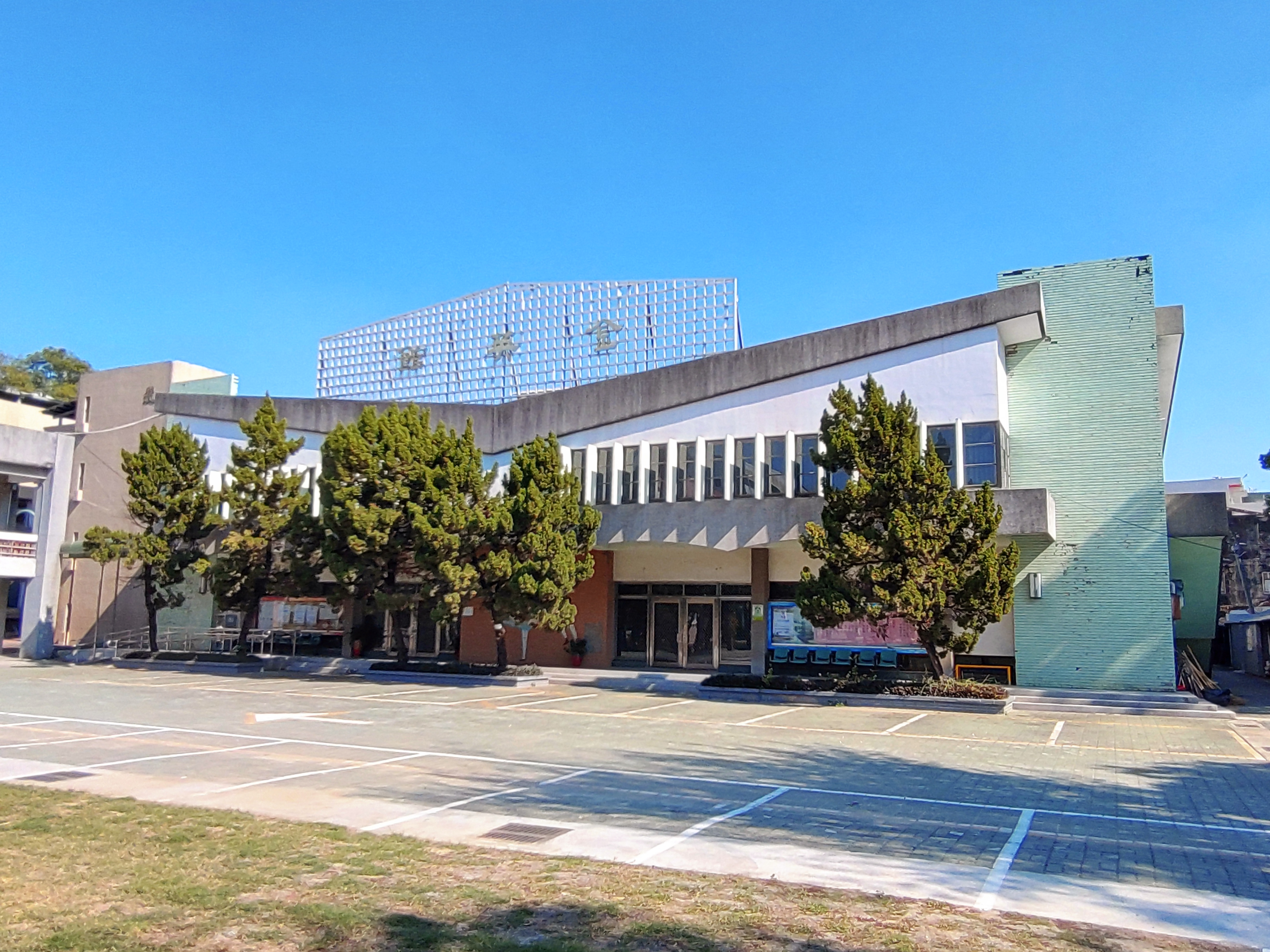
Jin Ying Hall, named in memory of the former principal, Cao Jinying.

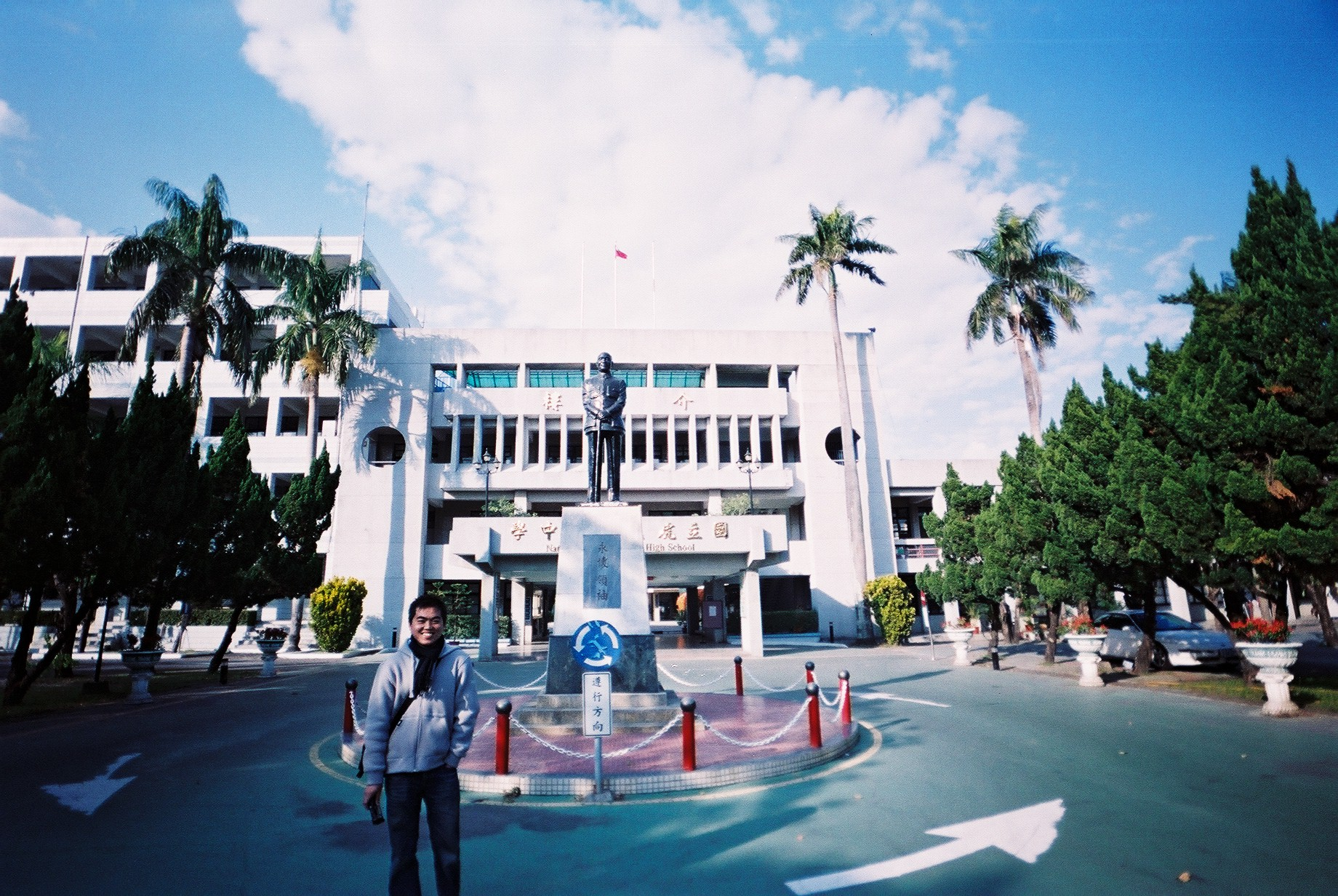
The original statue of Chiang Kai-shek (now dismantled, with the inscription "Eternal Remembrance of the Leader" on the base).

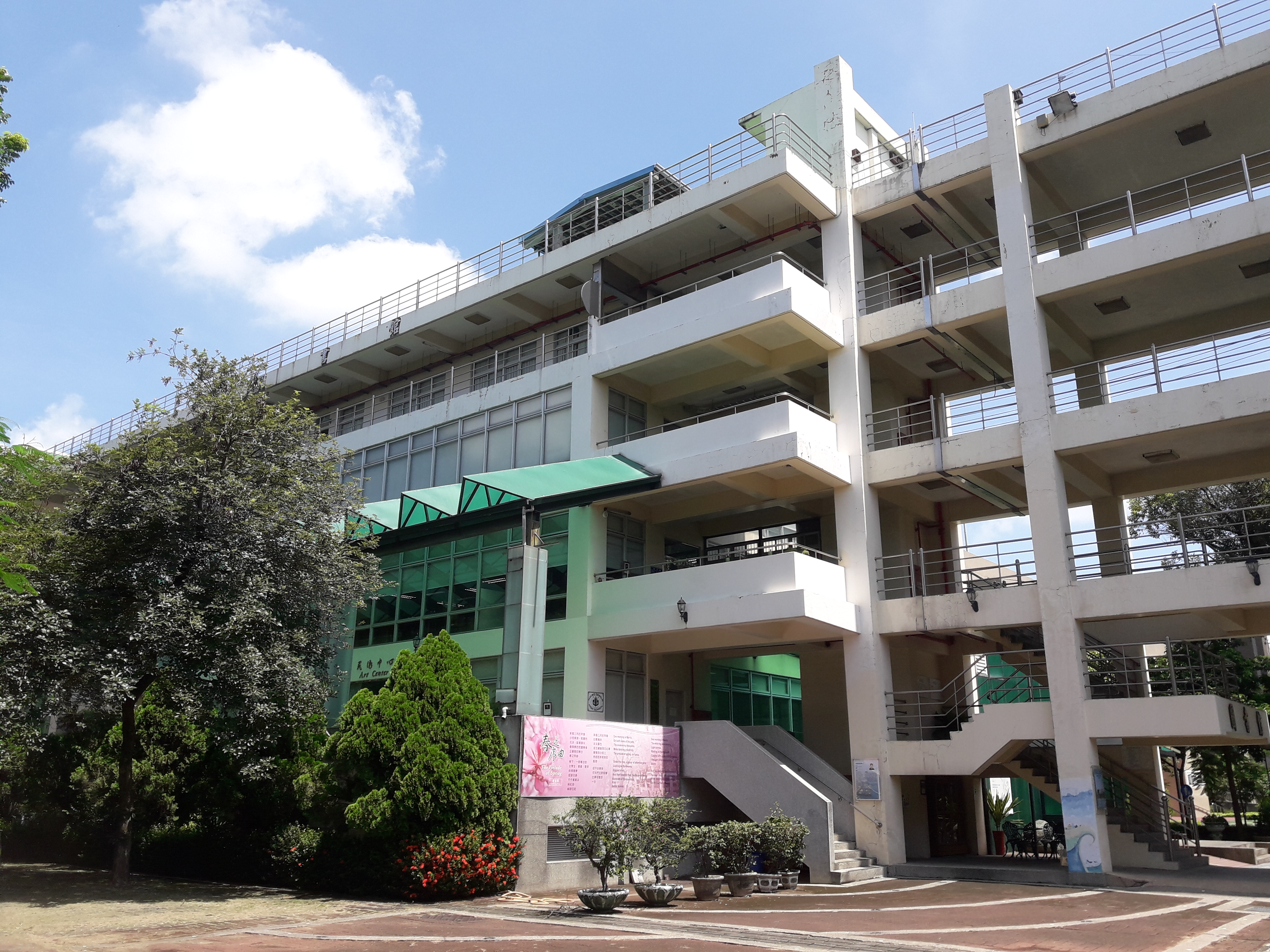
Library.

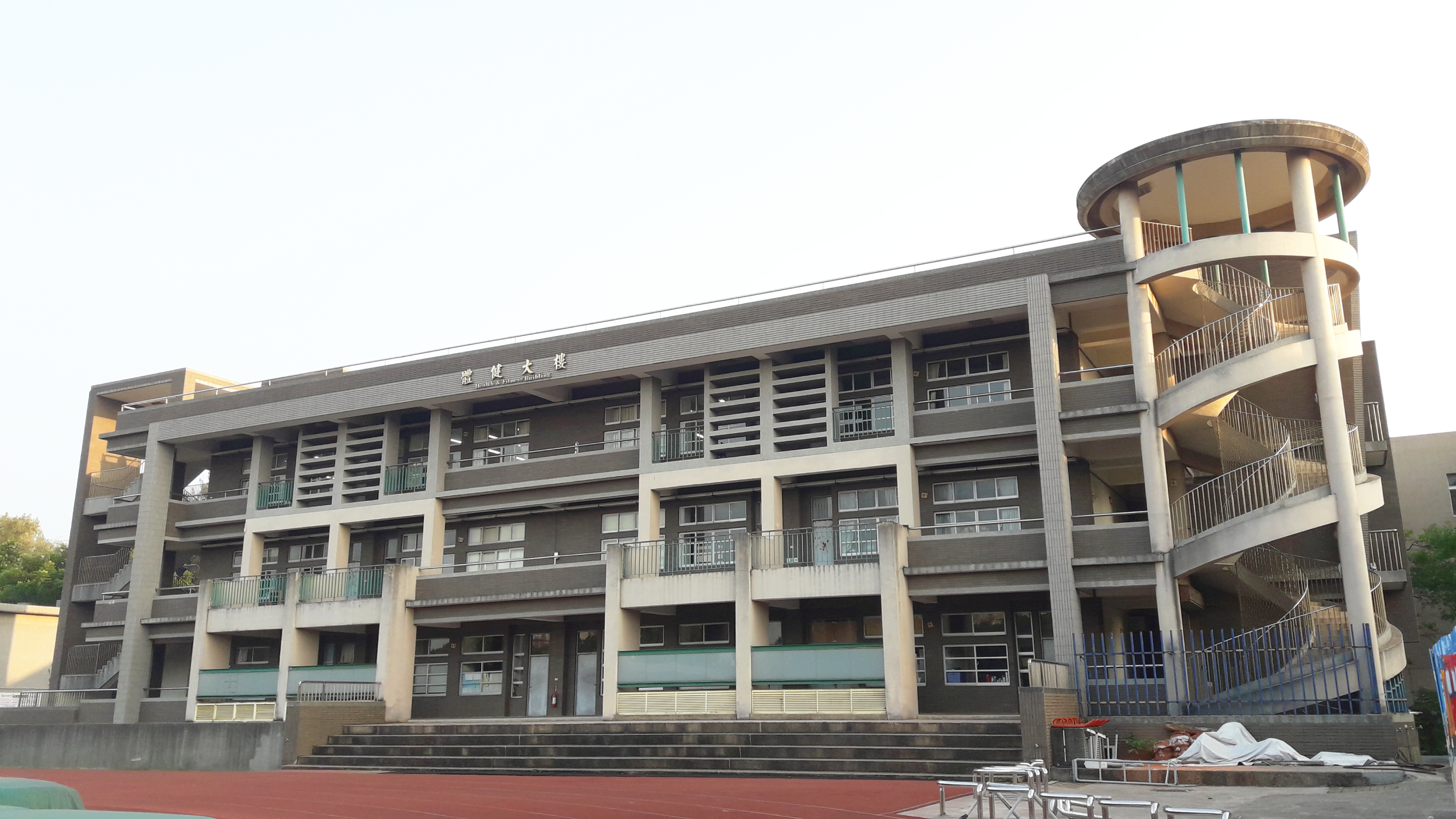
Health and Sports Building. Two walls allow outstanding students to leave their handprints, rewarding and inspiring future students.

== Faculty ==
- John Chiang (Chiang Hsiao-yen): An English teacher at Huwei Girls’ High School, and the father of legislator Wayne Chang. While teaching at Huwei Girls’ High School, John Chiang met a student, Huang Meilun, whom he later married.
- Lin Chiu-hua: An alumnus of Taiwan Provincial Huwei High School. While serving as the director of academic affairs, he assisted then-principal Li Shi-kun in overseeing the construction of the teachers’ dormitory, Hongdao New Village. He was recognized by the Taiwan Provincial Department of Education in the first "Fragrance of the Classroom" record.
- Luo Rong-yu, nicknamed "Big Luo": A technician and retired military serviceman with an interest in physics, Luo helped physics teachers at the school create teaching aids such as a Foucault pendulum and a Tesla coil. He was awarded the Ministry of Education's Fragrance of the Classroom award in 2019.

== Alumni ==
Notable alumni of Huwei High School include three former Yunlin County magistrates: Hsu Wen-tsu, Liao Chuan-yu, and Su Wen-hsiung, collectively known by locals as the “Three Consecutive Magistrates from Huwei High.”

== Other ==
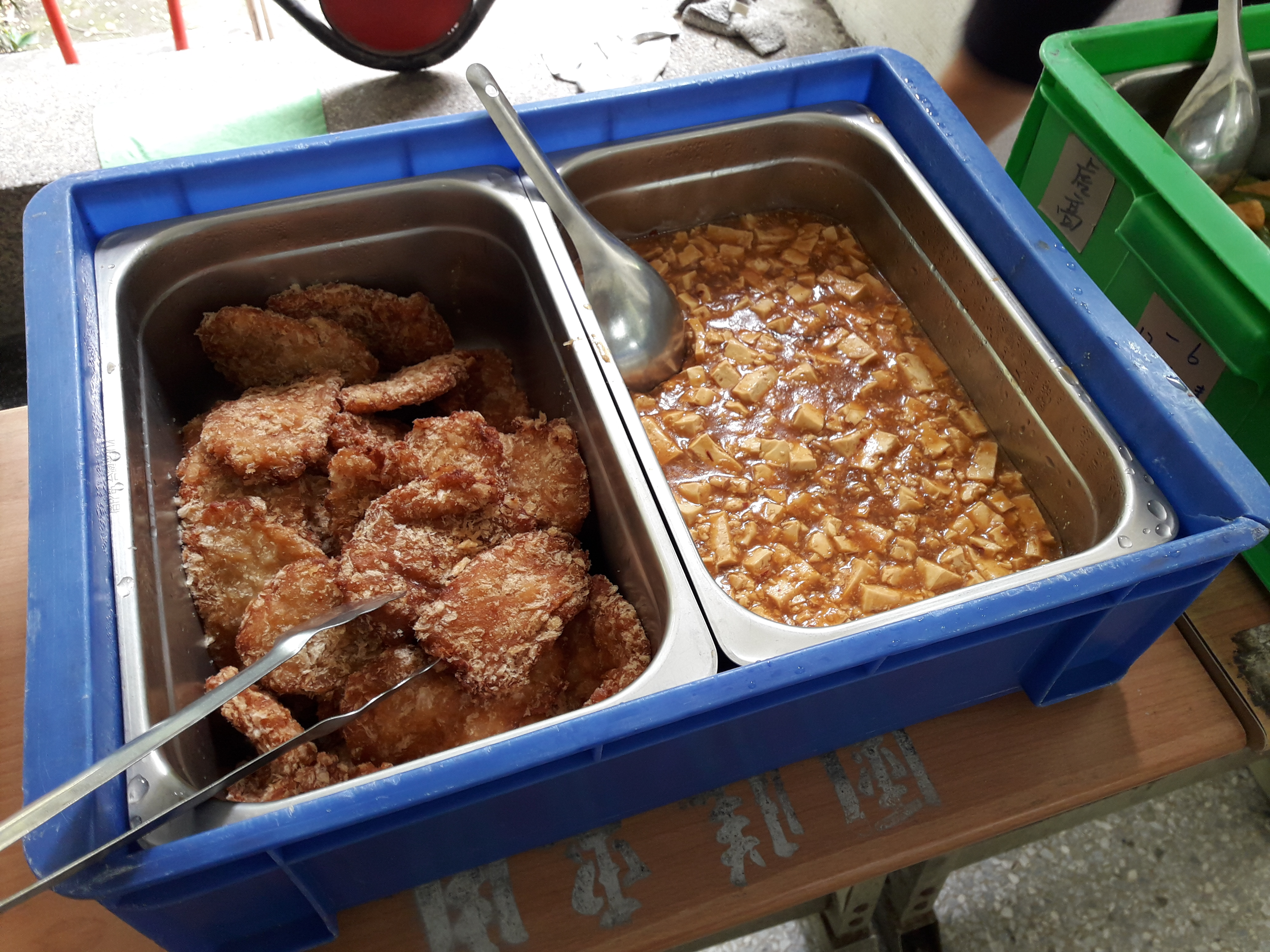
Some dishes from the group meal photographed in August 2019.

=== School lunch ===
In 2003, a journal survey revealed that Huwei High School's nutritious lunches were provided by four HACCP-certified suppliers: Weidaxiang, Songzhilin, Zhumin, and Meijing. Dormitory students received lunches from the school, while a small number of students brought their own. By 2015, the school switched to a group meal system, allowing each class to select a supplier through class meetings.

At one point, students expressed dissatisfaction with certain aspects of the lunch program. Complaints posted on a social media platform criticized the inclusion of dorayaki as part of the "four dishes and one soup" meal, uncut bamboo shoots being cooked whole, reheated frozen vegetables, undercooked soup ingredients, and chicken drumsticks with unplucked feathers.

=== Unreasonable School Regulations ===
In 2015, the Humanistic Education Foundation held a press conference to criticize unreasonable school rules across Taiwan. Huwei High School was cited as an example for its rule that using a charger on campus could result in a warning.

=== Urban Legend ===
A classroom on the third floor of the Physical Education Building at Huwei High School became known as the “Lucky Classroom.” Between 2011 and 2014, students attending this classroom consistently achieved perfect scores of 75 on the university entrance examination. In 2014, over half of the 30 students from the class using this room scored above 70.

== Bibliography ==
- Wú Qīnghǎi (2000-04-01). Hǔxī Měiměi Yī Jiǎzǐ: Guólì Hǔwěi Gāojí Zhōngxué Liùshí Zhōunián Jìniàn Tèkān 虎溪浼浼一甲子：國立虎尾高級中學六十週年紀念特刊 [Sixty Years by the Tiger Creek: 60th Anniversary Commemorative Edition of National Huwei Senior High School] (in Chinese). Archived from the original on 2021-04-16.
- Zhāng Zhōngyǔ (2001). Guólì Hǔwěi Gāojí Zhōngxué Xiàoshǐ 國立虎尾高級中學校史 [History of National Huwei Senior High School] (in Chinese (Taiwan)). Archived from the original on 2021-04-16.
- Bā Wénhuà Xiéhuì (2006). Hǔwěi Zhèn Kāifā Shǐ 虎尾鎮開發史 [The History of the Development of Huwei Township] (in Chinese (Taiwan)). 雲林縣虎尾巴文化協會編纂. 雲縣虎尾鎮公所. 雲林縣虎尾鎮. ISBN 978-986-05-2405-5.
- Liào Nǎizhēn, ed. (2010). Hǔxī Měiměi Gǔlái Xī: Guólì Hǔwěi Gāojí Zhōngxué Qīshí Zhōunián Jìniàn Tèkān 虎溪浼浼古來稀：國立虎尾高級中學七十週年紀念特刊 [Huxi Měiměi Gǔlái Xī: Special Issue for the 70th Anniversary of the National Huwei Senior High School] (in Chinese (Taiwan)). 雲林縣虎尾巴文化協會編纂 (雲林縣虎尾鎮 ed.). 虎尾高中. ISBN 978-986-02-2767-3. Archived from the original on 2021-04-16.
- Lǐ Yèzhèng (2018). Hǔwěi Zhènzhì 虎尾鎮志 [History of Huwei Township] (in Chinese (Taiwan)). 李謁政總編纂. 雲縣虎尾鎮公所. 雲林縣虎尾鎮. ISBN 978-986-05-2405-5.
- Hǔ jù bāshí chāoyuè diānfēng: Guólì Hǔwěi Gāojí Zhōngxué 80 zhōunián jìniàn tèkān 虎踞八十超越顛峰：國立虎尾高級中學80週年紀念特刊 [The Tiger Stands Guard at 80, Surpassing the Peak: 80th Anniversary Commemorative Special Edition of National Huwei Senior High School] (in Chinese (Taiwan)) (Wú Qīnghǎi ed.). 2020-11-01.
