= XUI =

XUI may refer to:

- X User Interface, a VMS Graphical user interface by DEC
- XOS (operating system), formerly XUI
- Xui (crater), on Mars
- XUI, Standard Carrier Alpha Code for Xpress United Inc.

== See also ==
- Xiu
- Xiu Xiu (disambiguation)
