= Fujin =

Fujin may refer to:

== People ==
- Fujin (wrestler) (born 1988), Japanese professional wrestler
- Chen Fujin (Chinese: 陈福今), Chinese politician
- Gao Fujin (Chinese: 高馥瑾; born 1984), Chinese ice hockey player
- Song Fujin (Chinese: 宋福金; died 945), Southern Tang empress
- Xiu Fujin, Chinese politician

== Fictional characters ==
- Fujin (Final Fantasy VIII), in the game Final Fantasy VIII
- Fujin, in the Mortal Kombat fighting game series

== Places ==
- Fujin, Heilongjiang, county-level city in Jiamusi prefecture-level city, Heilongjiang, China
- Fujin Road (Shanghai Metro), station on the Shanghai Metro Line 1

== Other uses ==
- Fūjin, Japanese god of the wind
- Fujin (headgear), a Chinese men's traditional headgear
