= He Xiu =

He Xiu (Wade–Giles: Ho Hsiu) is the name of:

- He Xiu (Han dynasty) (何休, Hé Xiū) (129–182), Chinese scholar
- He Xiu (Qing dynasty) (何琇, Hé Xiù), Chinese scholar
