= Secondary education in Taiwan =

Overview of the secondary education system of Taiwan

- Traditional Chinese: 國民中學
- Simplified Chinese: 国民中学
- Literal meaning: National Middle-school
Transcriptions
Standard Mandarin
- Hanyu Pinyin: Guómín Zhōngxué
Southern Min
- Hokkien POJ: Kok-bîn Tiong-ha̍k

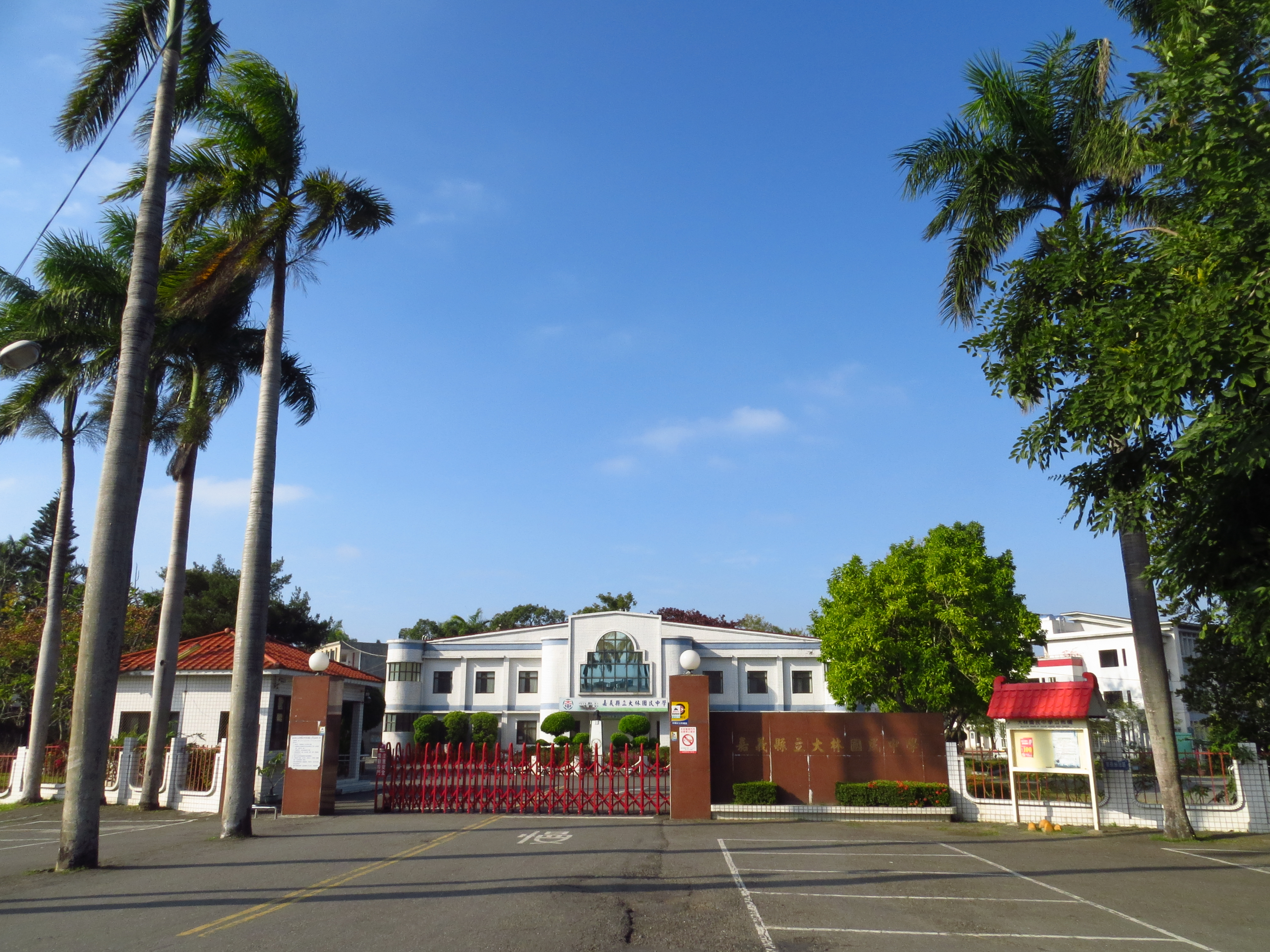
Dalin Junior High School in Dalin, Chiayi County.

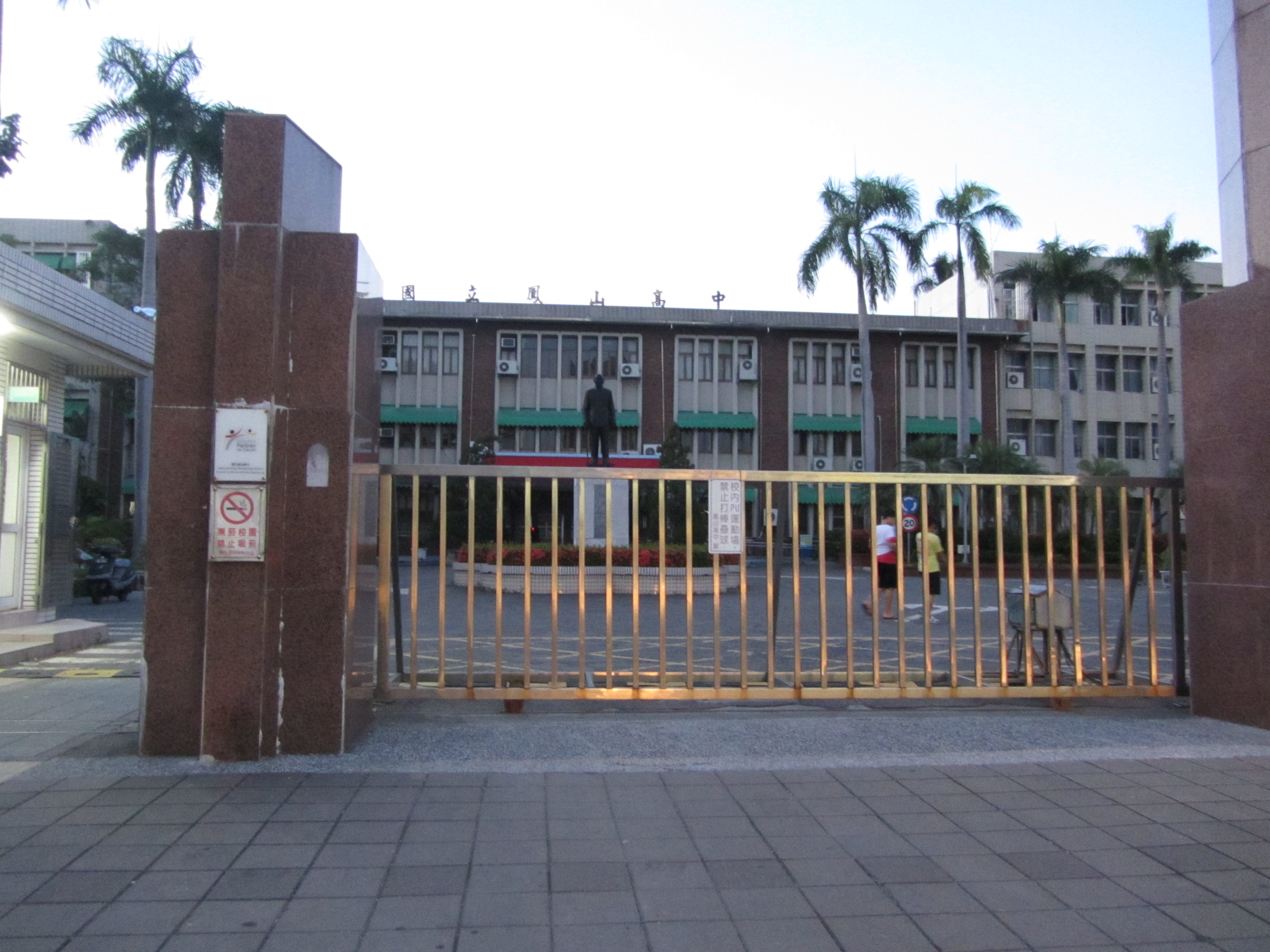
National Fongshan Senior High School in Fongshan, Kaohsiung City.

Secondary education in Taiwan refers to the Taiwanese education system in junior high school (year 7–9) and senior high school (year 10–12). Junior high school education is compulsory in Taiwan. Children and youths aged 6 to 15 are required to receive nine years of compulsory education. By law, every pupil who completed his or her primary education must attend a junior high school for at least three years, with exemptions to homeschooling and severe disorder or disabilities. Legal guardians of offenders may be subjected to fines up to NT$300, where penalties may be repeatedly imposed until offenders return to school. (Note: Article 2 of Regulation for the exchange rate between New Taiwan Dollars and the fiat currency in the laws of the Republic of China reads, "Wherever the laws and regulations in force specifies the amount of monies in the currency unit of Yuan (圓), Silver Yuan, or Yuan (元), that is three times the New Taiwan Dollar." Therefore the highest fine of, e.g. "100 yuan", stated in all laws of the Republic of China, is equivalent to NT$300.)

== History ==
=== Empire of Japan ===
The history of secondary education in Taiwan dates back to the Japanese rule. In 1896, Taiwan's colonial government implemented the policy of Direct Schools System, which was the first modern schooling system with reference to the Western system in the history of education in Taiwan. Japan later made three revisions to the educational policy in Taiwan and made use of education to promote militarism and loyalty to the Empire of Japan.

=== Republic of China ===
In August 1945, the Pacific War ended and Taiwan was handed over to the Nationalist Government of the Republic of China. The current secondary education system in Taiwan was formed in 1968, in which the Ministry of Education of the Republic of China implemented nine years of compulsory education to enhance the level of knowledge of Taiwanese.

Upon completion of studies in a junior high school, students may opt to pursue further studies or enter workforce. For those pursuing further studies, 2014 graduates could take the Comprehensive Assessment Program (國中教育會考) or the Special Entrance Examination (特色招生考試).

Several educational reforms were vastly promoted, which included the extension and normalization of education and independent learning. The calls for extension of years of education started in 1983, and came to a consensus in 2003. It was announced in 2011 that the Twelve Years of Basic Education (十二年國民基本教育) will be implemented three years later, where education in Taiwan will be extended from nine years to twelve years, while the current promotion system to a senior high school will be abolished. This causes a fundamental impact on Secondary education in Taiwan.

== Period ==
Taiwan uses the Minguo calendar system. A school year consists of two semesters, with the fall semester begins in early September every year and runs through late January or early February. The spring semester begins in mid February and ends in early June. Semester breaks typically last for around two or three weeks surrounding the Spring Festival and Lunar New Year. Statistics on education are according to each academic year, while expenditures according to each fiscal year.

== Subjects and medium of instruction ==
In junior high schools, subjects covered including literature, mathematics, English, science, technology, social studies, home economics and craft, arts and physical education. The language used in both junior and senior high schools is Mandarin at all levels. However, English classes are mandatory throughout the whole secondary education period.

== Students ==
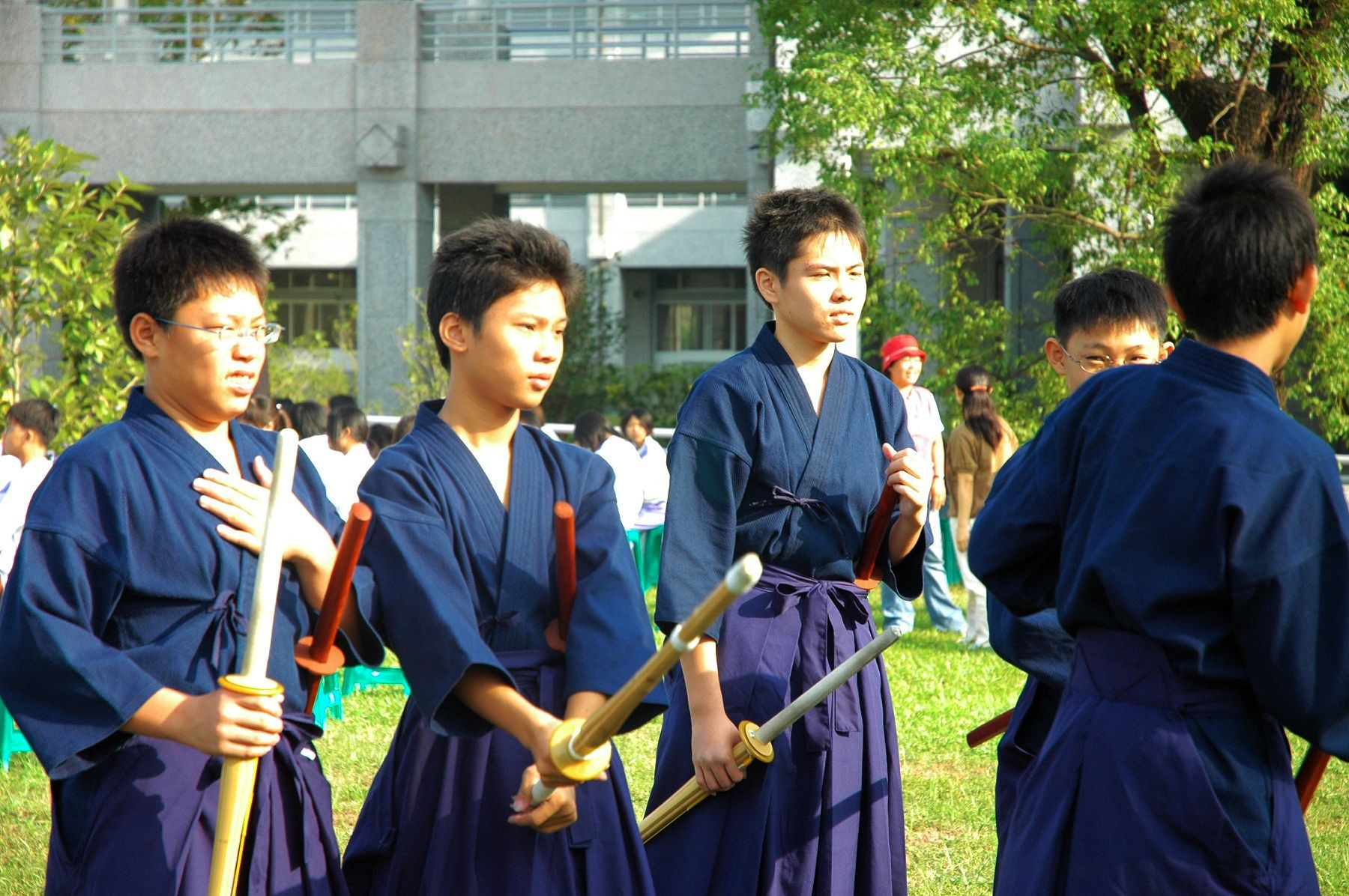
Taiwanese junior high school students

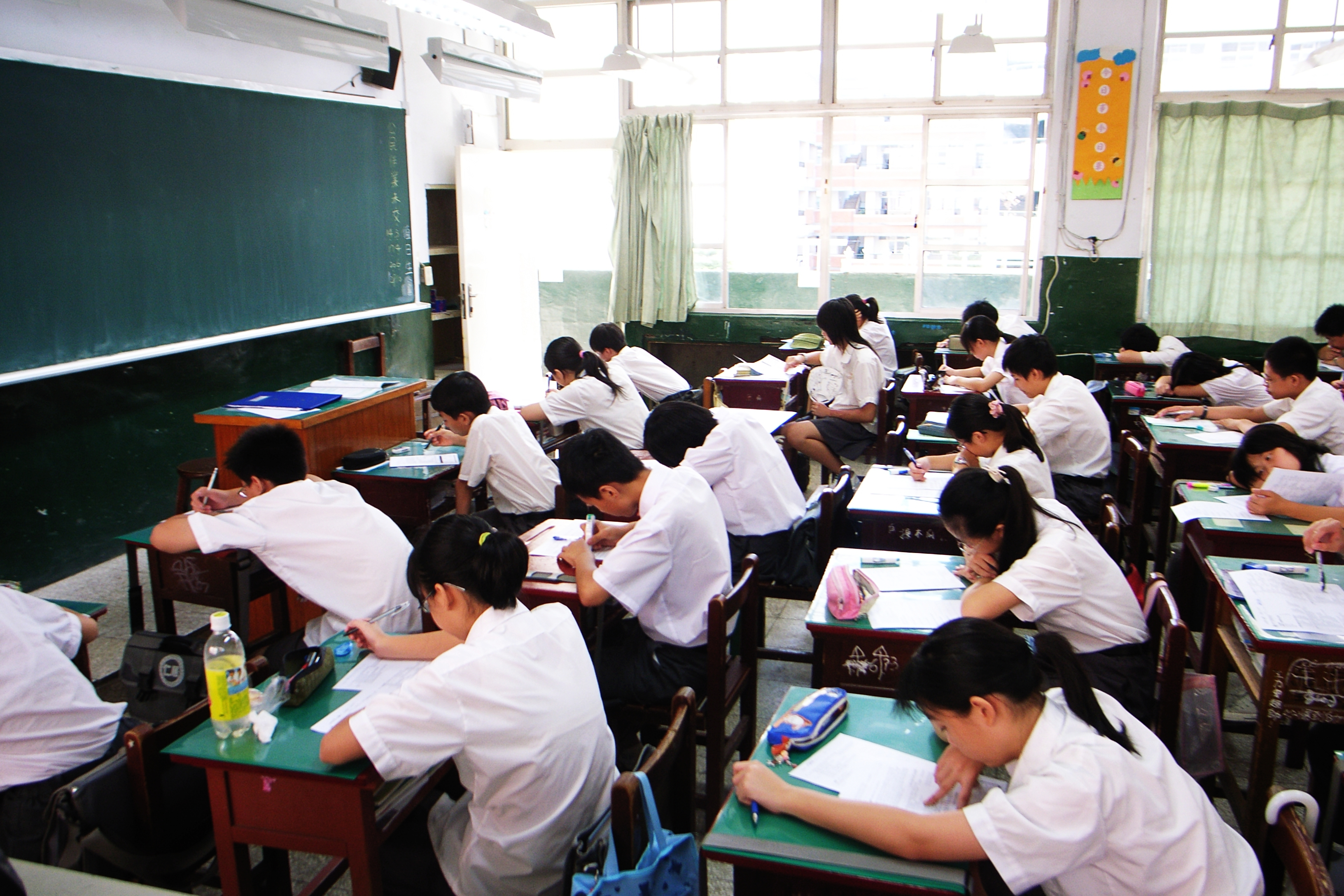
Taiwanese junior high school students

According to the Educational Statistics of the Republic of China (中華民國教育統計), Taiwan has 932 junior high schools in total, 844,884 students and 880 full-time teachers in those schools, as of the 101st academic year (August 2012 to July 2013). There has been a steep increase in those numbers since the implementation of nine years of compulsory education, which reflects the growth and changes in the junior high school education in Taiwan.

For students, the proportion of the number of students dropped from 93.96% in the 39th academic year (August 1950 to July 1951) to 50.18% in the 98th academic year (August 2009 to July 2010), showing the change in the educational structure of Taiwan. Another fact worth mentioning is the change in proportion of genders. In the 39th academic year (August 1950 to July 1951), there were 40,670 boys, which nearly doubled that of the 20,412 girls. However, as of the 101st academic year (August 2012 to July 2013), the difference in the proportion of boys and girls significantly reduced, where there was 440,711 boys and 404,173 girls. This indicates that under the compulsory education policy and the rise in feminism, the education conditions for girls have improved. In addition to this, the promotion rates of students in junior high schools increased from 51.15% to 99.15% from the 39th to the 101st academic year. In other words, currently in Taiwan, almost every student can be promoted and pursue further studies.

== Schools ==
For schools, in the 39th academic year, there were only 66 junior high schools. After the implementation of compulsory education, junior high schools were set up to meet the goal of One Junior High School in Each Township (一鄉鎮一國中). In the fiscal year of 2009, the total expenditure on education was NT$802.3 billion, which was 5.83% of the Gross domestic product (GDP).

== Aboriginal and non-Taiwanese education ==
As for the aboriginal education, there were 72,652 aboriginal students studying in junior high schools in the 101st academic year. The first five groups in terms of student population are: Amis (26,113), Atayal (13,410), Paiwan (12,946), Bunun (8,113) and Truku (4,600). In that academic year, there were a total of 41,525 students who were new immigrants; sorted by the nationality (non-ROC national) of a parent, the first three countries are: People's Republic of China (16,221), Vietnam (10,690) and Indonesia (8,099), where they sum up to comprise 84.30% of the total number of new-immigrant student population. As for overseas Taiwanese, there were 206 students who returned to Taiwan to attend a junior high school in the 98th academic year (August 2009 to July 2010), mainly those residing in Indonesia (60), followed by the United States (29).

== See also ==
- Education in Taiwan
- K-12 Education Administration
