= Comprehensive Assessment Program for Junior High School Students =

Taiwanese school exam

The Comprehensive Assessment Program for Junior High School Students or CAP (Chinese: 國中教育會考; pinyin: Guózhōng Jiàoyù Huìkǎo) is an exam for junior high school students in the Republic of China (Taiwan).

The CAP is usually held in the weekend of mid-May by the Ministry of Education Republic of China, creating a standardized test for 9th graders. The Research Center for Psychological and Educational Testing (RCPET) at National Taiwan Normal University is the specific responsible unit. The CAP is an exam for Taiwanese students before going to high school or vocational school, for students, teachers, schools, and parents get to know the students' learning quality. The 2021 CAP was held on 15 and 16 May. The CAP consists of Chinese Language (writing and reading assessment), English (reading and listening assessment), Mathematics (multiple-choice tests and calculation problems), Natural Science (Including: Biology, Chemistry, Physics and Science of Earth) and Social Studies (Including: Geography, History, Personal and Social Study, Politics, Laws, Economics and International Studies)

== Time Table ==
This is the timetable of CAP. (UTC+8)

	Saturday		Sunday	
Morning	8:20~8:30	Test Description	8:20~8:30	Test Description
Morning	8:30~9:40	Social Studies	8:30~9:40	Natural Science
Morning	9:40~10:20	Break Time	9:40~10:20	Break Time
Morning	10:20~10:30	Test Description	10:20~10:30	Test Description
Morning	10:30~11:50	Mathematics	10:30~11:30	English (Reading)
Morning	10:30~11:50	Mathematics	11:30~12:00	Break Time
Morning	10:30~11:50	Mathematics	12:00~12:05	Test Description
Morning	10:30~11:50	Mathematics	12:05~12:30	English (Listening)
Noon	11:50~13:40	Lunch Break		
Afternoon	13:40~13:50	Test Description		
Afternoon	13:50~15:00	Chinese		
Afternoon	15:00~15:40	Break Time		
Afternoon	15:40~15:50	Test Description		
Afternoon	15:50~16:40	Writing		

- You are not allowed to enter the examination room if you are 20 minutes late (except for the English listening test).
- You are not allowed to enter the examination room after the English listening test is broadcast.
- You are not allowed to hand in the exam papers and leave the classroom in less than 30 minutes.
- You are not allowed to hand in the papers earlier during English listening.

== Test content ==
The examination is a Criterion-referenced test, which means the number of correct answers and their corresponding ranks would have been set before the examination. For the exam, the results of each subject are divided into "精熟" (grade A) and "基礎" (grade B) and "待加強" (grade C). Grade A means that the student is able to master the course in junior high school; Grade B means that the student has the basic ability of the subject; Grade C means that the student's ability in the subject is lagging behind. In grade A and grade B, each will be divided into three smaller levels based on the number of plus signs, such as A, A+, A++, etc.

The subjects are mainly multiple-choice questions with four choices, and a bit of non-choice questions including composition in Chinese, non-choice questions in mathematics, and English listening test in English. Among them, the composition score of Chinese is based on a grading system, with a full score of 6 and a minimum score of 0. In terms of mathematics, there are two to three non-choice questions, each with a full score of 3, accounting for 15% of the total score of the subject; English listening accounts for 20% of the total score of the subject.

=== Subjects ===
	Chinese	Englishⁿ		Mathematics	Social Studies	Natural Science	Writing Assessment
	Chinese	Reading	Listening	Mathematics	Social Studies	Natural Science	Writing Assessment
Testing time	70 minutes	60 minutes	25 minutes	80 minutes	70 minutes	70 minutes	50 minutes
Multiple choice questions	45-50	40-45	20-30	25-30	60-70	50-60	0
Non-multiple-choice questions	0	0	0	2-3	0	0	1
ⁿ For 2013 and 2014 CAP, the reading and listening part of the English subject was merged into an 80-minute test.

== Regions ==
The CAP consists of 14 testing regions. Examinees could only choose one testing region to register for, usually choosing the region where their junior high school is located. Although the exam questions are unified nationally, the method to calculate their actual scores may vary in different regions.

Region	Counties and Cities
Taipei	Taipei City, New Taipei City, Keelung City
Taoyuan-Lienchiang	Taoyuan City, Lienchiang County
Yilan	Yilan County
Hsinchu-Miaoli	Hsinchu City, Hsinchu County, Miaoli County
Taichung-Nantou	Taichung City, Nantou County
Yunlin	Yunlin County
Changhua	Changhua County
Chiayi	Chiayi City, Chiayi County
Tainan	Tainan City
Pingtung	Pingtung County
Kaohsiung	Kaohsiung City
Hualien	Hualien County
Taitung	Taitung County
Kinmen	Kinmen County

== See also ==
- Secondary education in Taiwan
- K-12 Education Administration
- Education in Taiwan
