= General Scholastic Ability Test =

Taiwanese university entrance examination

General Scholastic Ability Test 大學學科能力測驗
- Acronym: GSAT, 學測
- Type: Entrance exam
- Administrator: College Entrance Examination Center
- Skills tested: Multiple, Optional, Handwritten questions
- Purpose: Applying to colleges
- Year started: 1994; 32 years ago
- Duration: Chinese: 90 Mins; English/Math AB: 100 Mins; Science/Social Studies: 110 Mins
- Score range: 0～15
- Score validity: This school year
- Regions: Taiwan
- Languages: Chinese、English
- Annual number of test takers: ▼116,465 (2022)
- Prerequisites: N/A
- Fee: Group: Basic NT$200, NT$170/subject; Personal: Basic NT$250, NT$170/subject
- Used by: Every college
- Website: www.ceec.edu.tw

== Structure and Format ==
The General Scholastic Ability Test (traditional Chinese: 學科能力測驗) is the Taiwanese university entrance exam and is organized by the College Entrance Examination Center (CEEC). The test is administered over two days and five subjects:

- Chinese language and literature
- English language
- Mathematics
- Social studies (including History, Geography, and Civics)
- Science (including Physics, Chemistry, Biology and Earth Science)

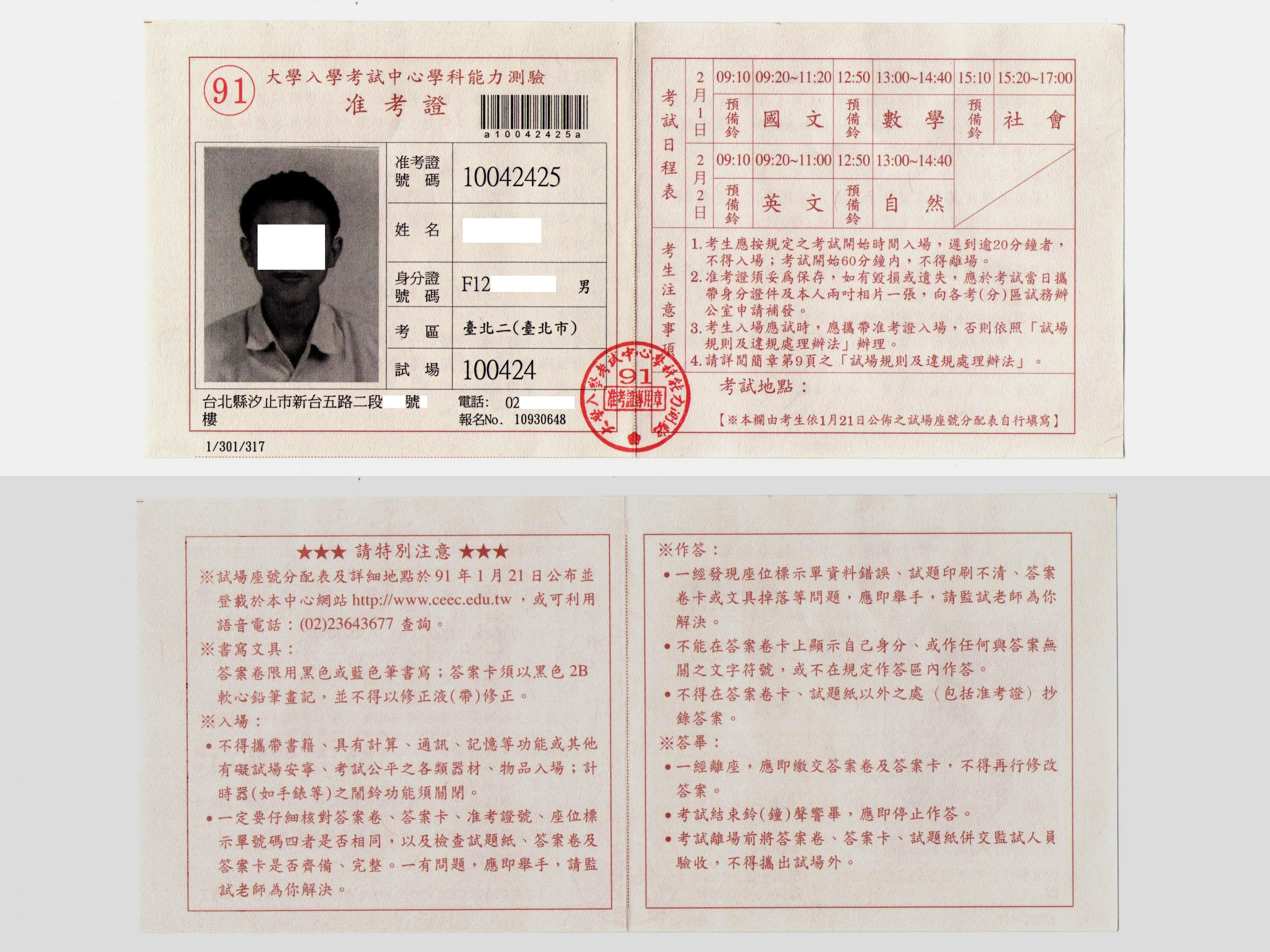
Admission ticket for the 2002 General Scholastic Ability Test (GSAT). Image from "2002 CEEC General Scholastic Ability Test admission ticket" by Solomon203 is licensed under CC BY-SA 4.0.

The materials cover the first two years of Taiwanese senior high school (10th and 11th grade).

== Before GSAT ==
In 2002, the General Scholastic Ability Test (GSAT) replaced the Joint College Entrance Examination (JCEE), and changed Taiwan's primary university admission test since the 1970s. The goal was to reduce the academic pressure by basing it only on JCEE to promote more diversified admission pathways. After these changes, the GSAT became the primary examination to connect with other selections, such as Recommendation and Screening, and Application Admission. It allows universities to consider broader abilities of students beyond only on exam performance. These changed Taiwan's educational policy to multiple evaluation criteria.

== Student stress and test anxiety ==
The GSAT has heavy psychological pressure on high school students because of its role in shaping Taiwanese students' academic futures. The study by Chao, Sung, and Tseng found that Taiwanese students experience high levels of anxiety related to high-stakes testing.Their research shows that the long preparation for the GSAT can affect students' motivation negatively. Many students spend years attending cram school programs to improve performance, and this causes a more serious competitive atmosphere.

== Social and educational context ==
Besides individual pressure, the GSAT also shows the social and cultural inequalities in Taiwan's education system. Wang and Tai (2025) argue that the standardized testing often reinforces the advantages of students from higher socioeconomic backgrounds. Families with better financial resources often can afford the higher expenses for tutoring, private schools, or additional test preparation, which shows unequal access to higher education opportunities. From the author's perspective while the GSAT's goal is to provide an objective measure of academic ability. However, it also reflects the social status of Taiwanese society.

General Scholastic Ability Test
- Traditional Chinese: 學科能力測驗
Transcriptions
Standard Mandarin
- Hanyu Pinyin: Xuékē nénglì cèyàn
- Wade–Giles: Hsüeh²-k′o¹ nêng²-li Ts′ê⁴-yen⁴
Hakka
- Pha̍k-fa-sṳ: Ho̍k-khô nèn-li̍t chhet-ngiam
Southern Min
- Hokkien POJ: Ha̍k-kho lêng-le̍k chhek-giām
- Tâi-lô: Ha̍k-kho lîng-li̍k tshik-giām
