= Xiu Zelan =

Taiwanese architect

- Born: August 15, 1925
- Died: February 27, 2016 (aged 90–91)

Xiu Zelan (Chinese: 修澤蘭; 15 August 1925 – 27 February 2016), also written as Hsiu Tse-Lan, was a Taiwanese architect. Xue was born in Yuanling, Hunan. During World War II, she attended the Architecture Department of National Central University in Chongqing (Now Southeast University School of Architecture). In 1947 she entered the Taiwan Rail Bureau. She took charge of the Department of General Logistics and Engineering as an assistant engineer. Her modernist interpretations of traditional motifs gained the attention of Chiang Kai-shek, and in 1965 she took charge of Yangmingshan's Chung-Shan Building project. Designed to house state ceremonies, the Chung-Shan Building brought Xiu acclaim and the project was subsequently considered to be one of her crowning achievements and earned the popular title "Number 1 Female Architect of Taiwan". Subsequently, on April 30, 1967, Xiu was awarded the first Golden Tripod Award for Architecture (alongside fellow architects including Wang Da-hong, Chen Chi-Kwan, Chen Ren-he, Haigo T. H. Shen, and Yang Cho-cheng). In 2015, on the 50th anniversary of the Chung-Shan Building's completion, she was presented with a certificate of gratitude from the Taiwanese government.

== Early years ==
=== Childhood ===
Xiu Zelan was born on August 15, 1925, in Yuanling, Hunan. She was raised with four brothers. Her grandfather was a Qing dynasty official, and Xiu's parents, aunts, and uncles received a Western-style education.

=== Education and early work ===
Xiu chose to pursue architecture because the Kuomintang were encouraging youth to study architecture and engineering during the Second Sino-Japanese War. When Xiu was admitted to the Architecture Department of the National Central University in Chongqing (now Southeast University School of Architecture), her mother hid her acceptance letter. In 1937, Xiu was one of two women to begin her studies at the university. The university was previously situated in Nanjing, but moved to Chongqing due to disruption of the Second World War. Around this time, Xiu first became acquainted with Chiang Kai-shek, who was the university's principal.

Upon graduation, she began practicing as an architect, entering her first job at the Ministry of Communications at Nanking (also known as Nanjing) in 1947. She was sent to Shanghai the following year, but design jobs were scarce due to “bad times”.

In 1949, as the Chinese Civil War escalated, Xiu accepted a job invitation at the Taiwan Railways Administration and started the new chapter of her career in Taiwan.

== Career in Taiwan ==
=== Post at the Taiwan Railways Administration ===
Xiu was assigned to the Department of General Logistics and Engineering as an assistant engineer/architect. Despite the department needing more funds and resources, Xiu was soon involved in many significant projects. One of the most notable examples was the Banqiao (also written as Panchiao) Train Station, now demolished.

Xiu met fellow engineer Fu Chi-kuan while working in the Department of General Logistics and Engineering in the TRA. They were later married in 1953 and had a son together. Xiu finished the Tri-Service General Hospital nursery school, her first building not linked to rail, in 1954.

In 1955, Xiu and her husband left their posts at the TRA and established a private practice together, the Tse Chun Architectural Firm, in the following year.

=== Private practice and rising fame ===
The Tse Chun Architectural Firm was highly active between 1956 and 1966, completing several educational building projects. After traveling to Canada and the United States in 1967, where she visited suburban residential communities, Xiu began planning the Garden City, a planned community in Taipei. Fu was charged with sedition and jailed for three years starting in 1970. The Garden City project continued, and the couple refocused on the project after Fu's release. Through 1987, Garden City was the couple's main project, with few unrelated buildings completed in the 1980s.

== Representative works ==
- Banqiao Station (板橋火車站(舊站))
- Chung-Shan Building (中山樓) (陽明山)
- Taipei Women's Teacher Junior College (台北女師專)
- Viator High School Church (衛道中學教堂)
- Lanyang Girl's Middle School Auditorium (蘭陽女中禮堂)
- Banqiao Senior High School (板橋高中)
- Chung-Shan Girl's Middle School Auditorium (中山女中禮堂)
- Taipei Jingmei Girls School Library and Admin Building (景美女中圖書館及行政大樓)
- Chih Shan Junior High School (至善國中)
- Wu Feng Elementary School (霧峰國小)
- National Chia-Yi Girls' Senior High School (國立嘉義女子高級中學)
- Huwei Senior High School (虎尾高中)
- National Chung Hsing Senior High School (中興高中)
- Hualien Normal University Library (花蓮師範學院圖書館)
- Sun Moon Lake Teacher's Hall (日月潭教師會館)
- Taichung Teacher's Hall (台中教師會館)
- Yangming Senior High School (陽明高中)
- Taipei Mingde Junior High School (明德國中)
