= Xiu.com =

Chinese e-commerce company

Xiu
- Website type: B2C
- Available in: Chinese
- Website: www.xiu.com
- Commercial: Yes
- Launched: March 2008; 18 years ago
- Current status: Active

Xiu (simplified Chinese: 走秀网; traditional Chinese: 走秀網; pinyin: zǒuxiùwǎng) is a Chinese language on-line shopping vertical, e-commerce company that operates in the People's Republic of China. Xiu was founded by Ji Wenhong (George Ji) and Jin Huang in March 2008. Xiu.com sells middle to luxury brand name fashion products including shoes, bags, ornaments, cosmetics and home decor. Xiu.com has buyer offices in New York City, Los Angeles, Miami, Australia, Paris, London, Italy, Korea, Hong Kong and Japan.

Prior to founding Xiu.com, Ji Wenhong had graduated from the University of International Business and Economics in 1992; he had then worked in the city of Shenzhen as an exporter.

== History ==
In April 2011, KPCB invested $20 million in Xiu.com.

In August 2011, xiu.com raised $100 million in joint funding from US private equity fund Warburg Pincus and venture capitalist KPCB. This was the largest B round money raised in the Chinese e-commerce industry and secured Xiu.com the top position in China's e-commerce fashion industry.

In November 2012, eBay announced it was partnering with Xiu.com to create eBay Styles (at ebay.xiu.com), which would provide online shopping to Chinese customers.

In May 2016, founder Ji Wenhong fled to Indonesia, and Interpol issued a red notice for him. He was accused of smuggling 438 million yuan worth of designer clothing by buying it from Europe and the United States, shipping it to Hong Kong, and then transporting it via travellers' baggage to Mainland China. On 4 August 2017, the Indonesian police captured Ji in Bali province. He was then extradited to China via Xiamen Airport on 16 August so he could stand trial.
