= Wang Xiu (Han dynasty) =

3rd-century Chinese official serving Cao Cao

- 王脩 / 王修

Grand Minister of Agriculture (大司農)
- In office 213 – ?
- Monarch: Emperor Xian of Han
- Chancellor: Cao Cao

Minister of Imperial Ancestral Ceremonies (奉常)
- In office 213 – ?
- Monarch: Emperor Xian of Han
- Chancellor: Cao Cao

Administrator of Wei Commandery (魏郡太守)
- In office 212 – 213
- Monarch: Emperor Xian of Han
- Chancellor: Cao Cao

Personal details
- Born: Before 173 Changle County, Shandong
- Died: After 216 Luoyang, Henan
- Children: Wang Zhong; Wang Yi
- Occupation: Politician
- Courtesy name: Shuzhi (叔治)

Wang Xiu (fl. 190s–210s), courtesy name Shuzhi, was a Chinese politician who lived during the late Eastern Han dynasty of China. He rose up to the highest echelon of government under the warlord Cao Cao, then the de facto head of the Han central government, in the lead-up to the Three Kingdoms period. He was known for being compassionate and daring.

== Early life ==
Wang Xiu was born in Yingling, Beihai Commandery, Qing Province, which is present-day Changle County, Shandong. His mother died when he was a young boy. At age 19, he travelled away to study, and sometime between 190 and 193 was drafted by Kong Rong to administer the district of Gaomi (高密), about 60 km from his hometown. As a district magistrate, Wang Xiu declared collective responsibility for harbouring criminals, helping to restore central authority over local magnates. Kong Rong nominated him as a xiaolian, although Wang Xiu several times tried to bow out of the nomination in favour of Bing Yuan (邴原).

As central authority continued to erode, robbery and pillage increased. At one point, Kong Rong was under some duress from brigands, and when Wang Xiu heard he rode out at night to assist. Noting Wang Xiu's bravery, Kong Rong shortly thereafter appointed Wang Xiu as the district magistrate of Jiaodong, which had been experiencing a rash of banditry. He arrived to find that a local named Gongsha Lu (公沙盧) had fortified and entrenched the grounds of the Gongsha clan's ancestral temple, and was refusing to come out and submit to local authority. Wang Xiu, with some few mounted guards behind him, broke through the enclosure's gate and executed Gongsha Lu and his brothers. Satisfied with punishing the ringleader, Wang Xiu mollified the rest of the family. Banditry thereafter decreased.

Kong Rong often relied on Wang Xiu to assist with rebellion and other such difficulties, and Wang Xiu would always heed the call immediately, even if he was on leave, resting in his hometown.

== Service under Yuan Tan ==
The warlord Yuan Shao attacked Qing Province in 196 and ousted Kong Rong. His son Yuan Tan was appointed as the Inspector of Qing Province, and he employed Wang Xiu as an attendant. One of Wang Xiu's colleagues, Liu Xian, often spoke ill of and slandered him. When Liu Xian committed an offence deserving of death, Wang Xiu argued on his behalf and secured his reprieve.

After being shuffled around a bit more, Wang Xiu found himself a mounted escort of Yuan Tan in 202, at the time of Yuan Shao's death. Due to unclear succession, a rift immediately developed between Yuan Tan and his youngest brother, Yuan Shang. Yuan Shang attacked and defeated Yuan Tan, and Wang Xiu led a cadre of officials and conscripts to save Yuan Tan from capture.

Yuan Tan wished to launch a counterattack against his brother Yuan Shang, but Wang Xiu cautioned against it. When asked directly how to proceed with the campaign, Wang Xiu advocated concord, a recommendation which Yuan Tan rejected. Following some more internecine strife, Yuan Tan sought help from, then ran afoul of Cao Cao. In 205, Cao Cao attacked Yuan Tan at Nanpi. Wang Xiu was in Le'an supervising grain shipments when he heard Yuan Tan was in trouble, and straight away gathered his guards and all the officials in his office, some several dozen men, and rode away to assist.

Without reaching him, Wang Xiu learned that Yuan Tan had been killed. He sent word to Cao Cao requesting permission to bury Yuan Tan's body, saying that he only wished to repay his former master with a proper burial, so that he could stand for execution without regrets. Impressed, Cao Cao granted permission and further took Wang Xiu into his employ, keeping him in his same position, supervising grain shipments in Le'an for Cao Cao's prodigious army.

== Later career ==
Following Yuan Tan's defeat, every commandery administrator in Qing Province surrendered to Cao Cao except the Administrator of Le'an, Guan Tong (管統). One of Cao Cao's first orders to Wang Xiu was to retrieve the head of Guan Tong. Wang Xiu saw Guan Tong's behaviour as an excess of loyalty to his old lord, and rather than executing him, instead cut his bonds and brought him before Cao Cao to submit. Cao Cao, pleased, pardoned Guan Tong.

Wang Xiu was attached to the Ministry of Works, and appointed as Superintendent of Treasury Officials, working with gold and silver instead of grain. In 212, following a memorial to Cao Cao complaining that his life was too easy, Wang Xiu was appointed as the Administrator of Wei Commandery. After Cao Cao's enfeoffment as the Duke of Wei in 213, he appointed Wang Xiu as Grand Minister of Agriculture (大司農), one of the Nine Ministers, among the highest civil positions in the bureaucracy. Following an exhortation against the establishment of corporal punishment, Wang Xiu moved laterally to the post of Minister of Imperial Ancestral Ceremonies (奉常), another of the Nine Ministers.

Not long after, Yan Cai (嚴才) led a palace revolt against Cao Cao in 216, attacking the inner gates with a force of some scores of men. Wang Xiu heard the commotion, and before his horse and carriage could be fetched led his subordinates on foot to the palace gates in great haste to assist. After the revolt was suppressed, Zhong Yao mildly chastised Wang Xiu, reminding him that it was customary for the Nine Ministers to remain in their offices whenever there was trouble in the capital. Wang Xiu replied that it may be customary, but lacked the righteous dignity of assisting those in danger. Wang Xiu died soon after, leaving behind works of literature and scholarship.

== Family ==
- Wang Zhong (王忠), son. Superintendent of Donglai (東萊; on the tip of the Shandong peninsula) and Cavalier Attendant-in-ordinary, an honorific title indicating favour and companionship of the ruler.
- Wang Yi (王儀), courtesy name Zhubiao (朱表), son, d. 252. colonel in Sima Zhao's army, executed by same for criticism following the Battle of Dongxing.
  - Wang Pou (王裒), courtesy name Weiyuan (偉元), grandson, died 311. Never took government office under the Jin dynasty due to his father's unfair execution. Became a famous recluse due to his steadfast refusal to enter service. Never married, and slain by Former Zhao invaders, both because he could not bear to part with the ancestral tombs of his native soil.

== See also ==
- Lists of people of the Three Kingdoms
