= Xiu Fujin =

Chinese politician (born 1950)

Xiu Fujin (born December 1950) is a politician of the People's Republic of China who is currently the Vice Chairman of the Central Committee.

== Biography ==
In 2008, he was elected as a member of the Standing Committee of the Eleventh National Committee of the Chinese People's Political Consultative Conference, representing the Revolutionary Committee, and was divided into the third group. In March 2013, he served as a member of the Standing Committee of the Twelfth National People's Congress and vice-chairman of the Foreign Affairs Committee of the National People's Congress. In January 2018, he was elected as a member of the 13th CPPCC National Committee.
