= He Xiu (Qing dynasty) =

Chinese author of Qing time

He Xiu (Chinese: 何琇; pinyin: Hé Xiù; Wade–Giles: Ho Hsiu; zi: Junzhuo 君琢, hao: Li'an 厲庵) was a Chinese scholar and writer during the Qing dynasty, active in the 18th century. He was from Wanping 宛平 (Shuntian Prefecture, Zhili (present-day Beijing)), obtained the jinshi degree during the Yongzheng era (1723–1735) and was a secretary in the Court of the Imperial Clan (zongrenfu zhushi 宗人府主事). He is best known for his biji-style work Qiaoxiang xiaoji (樵香小記 / 樵香小记).

== Qiaoxiang xiaoji ==
The Qiaoxiang xiaoji (樵香小记) offers insights into He Xiu's experiences and reflections, characteristic of the biji genre, which blends personal memoir with literary commentary. While specific details about He Xiu's life and other works are scarce, the inclusion of the Qiaoxiang xiaoji in the collection Shoushange congshu 守山阁丛书 of Qian Xizuo 錢熙祚 (d. 1844) shows the appreciation of this book in the literary landscape of the Qing dynasty. This edition was used by the Hanyu da zidian (HYDZD). The work is also included in the Siku quanshu 四庫全書.

== Bibliography ==
- Li Xueqin 李学勤, and Lü Wenyu 吕文郁, eds.: Siku da cidian 四庫大辭典, Changchun: Jilin daxue chubanshe 1996 (2 vols.)
- Hanyu da zidian. 1993 (one-volume ed.)
