= Xiu Xiu (disambiguation) =

Xiu Xiu is an American experimental indie band.

Xiu Xiu may also refer to:

- Xiu Xiu (pentathlete) (born 1987), female Chinese modern pentathlete
- Xiu Xiu: The Sent Down Girl, 1998 Chinese film directed by actress Joan Chen
- Valen Hsu (born 1974), also known as Xiu Xiu, Taiwanese female singer
