= K-12 Education Administration =

Government agency of the Republic of China

Coordinates: 24.058524°N 120.698115°E

- 教育部國民及學前教育署
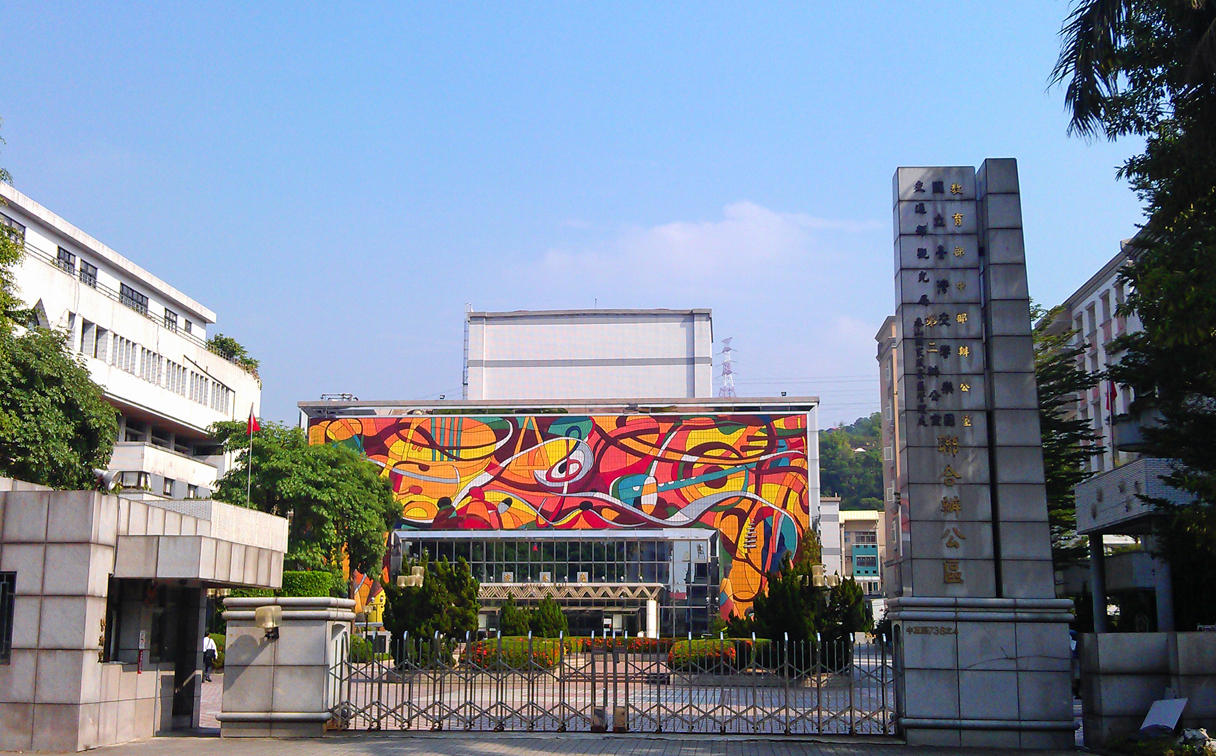

Agency overview
- Formed: 25 August 1945 (as Department of Education); 1 January 2013 (as K12EA)
- Headquarters: Wufeng, Taichung, Taiwan
- Agency executives: Peng Fu-yuan, Director-General; Xu Li-juan, Dai Shu-fen, Deputy Director-Generals
- Parent agency: Ministry of Education
- Website: Official website

The K-12 Education Administration (K12EA; traditional Chinese: 教育部國民及學前教育署; simplified Chinese: 教育部国民及学前教育署; pinyin: Jiàoyùbù Guómínjí Xuéqián Jiàoyùshǔ) is the agency of the Ministry of Education of Taiwan responsible for formulating, executing and supervising educational policies and systems for senior high school education and below in Taiwan.

== History ==
The agency was originally established as the Department of Education on 25 August 1945 in Taipei. In 1947, it became the subordinate of Taiwan Provincial Government. On 1 August 1956, it was moved to Wufeng Township, Taichung County. In July 1999, it became the subordinate of Ministry of Education. On 1 January 2013, it was renamed as K-12 Education Administration.

== Organizational structure ==
=== Operational divisions ===
- Division of Academic and Vocational Senior High Education
- Division of Junior High, Elementary School and Preschool Education
- Division of Indigenous People and Special Education
- Division of Student Affairs and Campus Security

=== Administrative divisions ===
- Office of the Secretary
- Office of Personnel
- Office of Civil Service and Ethics
- Office of Accounting

== List of Director-Generals (K-12 Education Administration period) ==
- Wu Ching-shan (January 2013 – July 2015)
- Lin Teng-jiao (August 2015 – December 2015) (Acting)
- Huang Zi-teng (December 2015 – August 2016)
- Qiu Qian-guo (August 2016 – September 2018)
- Xu Li-juan (September 2018 – December 2018) (Acting)
- Peng Fu-yuan (December 2018 –) (Incumbent)

== See also ==
- Ministry of Education (Taiwan)
