= VPB-20 =

Patrol Bombing Squadron 20
- Active: 15 February 1944 – 4 February 1946
- Country: United States of America
- Branch: United States Navy
- Type: squadron
- Role: Maritime patrol
- Engagements: World War II

Aircraft flown
- Patrol: PBM-3D/5 Mariner

VPB-20 was a patrol bombing squadron of the U.S. Navy. The squadron was established as Patrol Squadron 20 (VP-20) on 15 February 1944, redesignated as Patrol Bombing Squadron 20 (VPB-20) on 1 October 1944, and disestablished on 4 February 1946.

== Operational history ==
- 15 February – July 1944: VP-20 was established at NAS Alameda, California. The aircrews began ground and flight training on the PBM-3D Mariner seaplane. While at Alameda, the squadron came under the operational control of FAW-8. Training continued through 19 July 1944.
- 19 July 1944: The squadron concluded operations at NAS Alameda in preparations for its trans-Pacific flight to NAS Kaneohe Bay, Hawaii. On the 26th, 10 officers and 96 enlisted personnel departed San Diego for Kaneohe as part of the advance party. The aircrews began flying the trans-Pacific flight on 10 August, with the last aircraft arriving on 29 August 1944.
- 31 August 1944: The majority of the squadron began advanced training in preparation for combat at Kaneohe under the operational control of FAW-2. Three crews had been unable to complete the trans-Pacific flight and remained at Alameda. They did not rejoin the squadron until mid-September.
- 15–28 October 1944: VPB-20 was ordered to proceed to the seaplane base at Los Negros, Manus, Admiralty Islands, in groups of three aircraft. The first group arrived at Manus on 24 October 1944, coming under the operational control of FAW-10. As each group of aircraft arrived, they were painted flat black in preparation for night operations. A detachment of two aircraft was sent on the 28th to Mios Woendi Island, followed on the 29th by a detachment of two aircraft to Morotai. The latter group of aircraft was provided tender support by USS Tangier. Nine aircraft remained at Manus, relieving VPB-29. Operations during this period were carried out in the vicinity of the Celebes Sea, Sulu Sea, Makassar Strait, and along the borders of islands in those waters.
- 14 November 1944: During night operations, squadron aircraft attacked and claimed damage to a Shōkaku-class aircraft carrier in Philippine waters. However, by this date, both Shōkaku and Zuikaku, the only members of that carrier class, had already been sunk in the Battle of the Philippine Sea and Battle of Leyte Gulf, respectively. The only carrier surviving of a class similar to Shōkaku was Jun'yō, a Hiyō-class aircraft carrier. It was in the vicinity at that time of the action and at the close of the war, it was located in the yards at Sasebo with aircraft bomb damage. She was scrapped after the war.
- 21–26 November 1944: The squadron, except for the Morotai detachment, was ordered to report to Leyte for further assignment. The first three crews to arrive were assigned night search missions out of Leyte. While in this area, the squadron was berthed aboard USS Currituck. On the 25th, the Morotai detachment was relieved by VPB-71 and rejoined the squadron at Leyte. A routine of three daily daytime searches was begun on the 26th.
- 27 November 1944: A submarine was spotted on radar by Lieutenant (jg) John B. Muoio and his crew in Ormoc Bay. Lieutenant (jg) Muoio had been providing air coverage for DESDIV 43 engaged in the bombardment of enemy positions at Ormoc Bay. The sighting was reported to the destroyer flotilla commander and they quickly located it and sank it with gunfire. Postwar examination of records indicate only one submarine sunk in that vicinity on that date, Yu 2, a Japanese Army submarine. The sinking of the submarine was accomplished by USS Waller, USS Pringle, USS Saufley, and USS Renshaw. Besides the crew of the submarine, there was an Army detachment of 15 men aboard when she was sunk. Only 15 men from the crew and detachment survived the sinking.
- 1–27 December 1944: During the Mindoro Invasion the squadron provided coverage for convoys and night combat patrols in the face of intense opposition. On 26–27 December a five-plane attack was made on a Japanese task force that was bombarding the beach head in Mangarin Bay, Mindoro. Two aircraft were shot down, but both crews were rescued. Lieutenant Warren M. Cox was hit by intense anti-aircraft (AA) fire and ditched in the bay. Lieutenant James V. Fallon's Mariner was riddled by fire from a Japanese destroyer and ditched 0.5 miles (0.80 km) away from the scene of the battle. Fallon and his crew reached Canipo Island two days later where they were aided by guerrillas and returned to the squadron three weeks later.
- 4–31 January 1945: VPB-20 departed Leyte Gulf for Lingayen Gulf in company with TG 73.1. Through the end of the month, the squadron provided support for convoys and invasion groups Marinduque, Lingayen, San Antonio, and Nausbu with night patrols and search and attack missions.
- 19 January 1945: Lieutenant (jg) Wesley O. Glaze attacked a 24-ship Japanese task force, damaging a Hiyō-class carrier, most likely the Jun'yō. Glaze approached the carrier at an altitude of 50 feet, barely clearing the flight deck, and dropped his three bombs in train (two 250 and one 500-pound GP), scoring two direct hits.
- 21 January 1945: A squadron PBM flown by Lieutenant Frank A. Yourek and crew sighted a submarine west of Ulithi and attacked it with 2 Depth charges and a Mark 24 homing torpedo. The submarine escaped but was apparently damaged by the attack. Three destroyers, USS Conklin, USS Corbesier, and USS Raby, observed the aircraft attack, and the next day they resumed the attack which resulted in the sinking of the submarine. Postwar records indicate the Japanese submarine lost was I-48 with a crew of 122, which had been on a Kaiten mission against shipping in Ulithi lagoon, but apparently none of the Kaiten midget submarines were launched before VPB-20's attack.
- 2 February 1945: At Leyte, six crews were berthed aboard USS San Carlos. The remaining 12 crews flew to NAB Woendi for an aircraft exchange for the new PBM-5 seaplane.
- 8 February 1945: The six crews at Leyte were relocated to the Jinamoc Seaplane Base, where they conducted anti-shipping patrols in the South China Sea and off the Indochina coastline.
- 26 February 1945: VPB-20 was relieved at Jinamoc by VPB-25. VPB-20 flew to Mangarin Bay, Mindoro, to relieve VPB-28. Tender support was provided by USS Tangier. The squadron conducted daytime searches over the South China Sea.
- 7 March 1945: VPB-20 relocated to Naval Station Sangley Point, Manila Bay, with tender support provided by USS Currituck. Daytime anti-shipping searches were conducted over the South China Sea.
- 11–29 March 1945: Four squadron aircraft were sent to join VPB-17 at Puerto Princesa, Palawan Islands, aboard USS Pocomoke. These crews participated in a formation attack on a Japanese convoy 60 miles (97 km) south of Hainan Island on the 29th, in which one aircraft was shot down with the loss of all hands.
- 1 May 1945: The Sangley Point aircraft of VPB-20 joined the detachment on USS Pocomoke when it moved to Tawi-Tawi, Sulu Archipelago. The squadron provided convoy coverage and reconnaissance flights in support of the invasion of Borneo. During the month numerous enemy small craft were sunk. During June, squadron activities were concentrated on mine spotting for convoys and task groups involved in operations around Borneo at Brunei Bay and Balikpapan.
- 4 June 1945: Lieutenant Deland J. Croze attacked two transports and an escort vessel in the Makassar Strait, sinking the two transports but receiving damage from the AA fire of the escort. Croze made a forced landing off the beach of Lingian Island near the northwestern tip of Celebes. One crewman died shortly after, six were captured by the Japanese, and three who avoided capture were later rescued. The fates of the captured crewmen, including Lieutenant Croze, are still unknown.
- 3 July 1945: A seven-aircraft detachment was sent to Lingayen Gulf, operating off USS Barataria. This group was primarily assigned to air-sea rescue operations. On the 9th, USS San Pablo relieved Barataria.
- 9–25 July 1945: Four aircraft were detached from the squadron at Tawi-Tawi and sent to NAS Sangley Point, for duty as transport and utility aircraft. On the 12th, the remainder of the Tawi-Tawi detachment boarded USS Half Moon for transportation to Sangley Point. After arrival on the 25th, they joined the Sangley detachment in conducting sector patrols in the western approaches to the Philippines.
- 1 August 1945: The Lingayen Gulf detachment of seven aircraft was assigned the role of air-sea rescue in support of the 15th and 13th Army Air Force missions.
- 5 Aug 1945: The Sangley detachment assigned five of its crews to ferry aircraft from Sangley Point to the Los Negros repair facility for overhauls.
- 29 Aug 1945: A four-crew detachment from Sangley Point boarded USS Currituck for transportation to Okinawa. Upon arrival, the detachment conducted mail and utility flights in support of Seventh Fleet operations.
- 21 September 1945: The Currituck detachment arrived in Shanghai. Primary duties consisted of mail flights between Okinawa; Jinsen, Korea; and Shanghai, China. On the 29th, the detachment moved to Taku, China, aboard USS Barataria, providing the same assistance in mail delivery and urgent delivery of parts.
- 4 February 1946: VPB-20 was disestablished at NAS Kaneohe Bay, Hawaii.

== Aircraft assignments ==
The squadron was assigned the following aircraft, effective on the dates shown:

- PBM-3D - February 1944
- PBM-5 - February 1945

== Home port assignments ==
The squadron was assigned to these home ports, effective on the dates shown:

- NAS Alameda, California - 15 February 1944
- NAS Kaneohe Bay, Hawaii - 31 August 1944

== See also ==
- Maritime patrol aircraft
- List of inactive United States Navy aircraft squadrons
- List of United States Navy aircraft squadrons
- List of squadrons in the Dictionary of American Naval Aviation Squadrons
- History of the United States Navy
