= VP-25 =

Patrol Squadron 25
- Active: 20 April 1944 – 28 June 1946
- Country: United States of America
- Branch: United States Navy
- Type: squadron
- Role: Maritime patrol
- Engagements: World War II

Aircraft flown
- Patrol: PBM-3D/3D2

VP-25 was a Patrol Squadron of the U.S. Navy. The squadron was established as Patrol Squadron 25 (VP-25) on 20 April 1944, redesignated Patrol Bombing Squadron 25 (VPB-25) on 1 October 1944, redesignated Patrol Squadron 25 (VP-25) on 15 May 1946 and disestablished on 28 June 1946. It was the second squadron to be designated VP-25, the first VP-25 was redesignated VP-23 on 1 August 1941.

== Operational history ==
- 20 April 1944: VP-25 was established at NAAS Harvey Point, North Carolina, under the operational control of FAW-5, as a seaplane squadron flying the PBM-3D Mariner.
- 26 June 1944: The squadron was sent to NAS Key West, Florida, for operational training in Anti-submarine warfare (ASW), returning to NAAS Harvey Point on 4 July 1944. The squadron remained at NAAS Harvey Point until 18 August 1944, when it departed for NAS Alameda, California, in preparation for a trans-Pacific flight.
- 21 August – 29 September 1944: VP-25 reported to FAW-14, NAS Alameda for orders. The squadron aircraft were given final maintenance checks and filled to capacity with supplies that would be needed in the combat theater. Orders were issued for departure on 15 September 1944, with 13 of the squadron’s 15 allocated aircraft arriving safely at NAS Kaneohe Bay, Hawaii. The remaining two aircraft arrived on 29 September 1944.
- 1 October – 14 November 1944: VP-25 was redesignated VPB-25, coming under the operational control of FAW-2. Further operational training was conducted aboard USS Bering Strait near Hilo Bay, Hawaii, until orders were received for the squadron to report to the combat zone on 14 November 1944.
- 15 November – 1 December 1944: VPB-25 departed Hawaii for San Pedro Bay, Leyte, Philippines. Aircrews flew in stages to the new base, while ground support staff and administrative personnel proceeded aboard USS Bering Strait. The latter arrived on station by 22 November 1944, and squadron personnel were transferred to USS Half Moon and USS San Pablo. VPB-25 began its first daytime combat sector patrols on 1 December 1944.
- 25–29 December 1944: VPB-25 received orders to transfer its operations to Mangarin Bay, Mindoro, Philippines. Aircrew personnel were transferred temporarily aboard USS Barataria while the rest of the squadron aboard USS Half Moon and USS San Pablo proceeded to the new station. On 29 December 1944, the squadron aircrews flew from San Pedro Bay to rejoin the rest of the squadron and the two tenders at Mangarin Bay. The squadron began conducting sector searches from the new location the next day. Searches from this base covered the coastline of French Indochina and north reaches toward Hainan Island.
- 29 January 1945: One of the squadron’s aircraft was damaged by anti-aircraft fire and forced down near Tam Quam, Indochina, only 1 crewmember was rescued.
- 6–25 February 1945: VPB-25 was transferred to Jinamoc Seaplane Base, Leyte, Philippines, under the operational control of FAW-10 to begin courier flight service to Mindoro, Subic Bay and Lingayen Gulf. After receiving and checking out its new Martin PBM-3D2 Mariners, the squadron transferred six aircraft back to Mangarin Bay on 25 February 1945, supported by USS San Carlos.
- 7 March 1945: The squadron’s Mangarin Bay detachment received orders to relocate to Manila Bay, off Cavite Naval Base, tender support was provided by USS San Carlos. Daylight sector antishipping patrols were conducted from this site west of the Philippine coastline. The Leyte detachment conducted similar daylight sector searches to the east of Jinamoc Island.
- 24–28 June 1945: The Cavite detachment was relocated to Lingayen Gulf, with tender support provided by USS Currituck, relieving VPB-17. Operations commenced with the squadron conducting Black Cat, nighttime, operations against enemy shipping on 28 June 1945. The seven aircraft of the Leyte detachment flew to Cavite to take its predecessor’s place, with three of the aircraft assigned to courier flights based ashore and the remaining aircraft assigned to USS San Carlos for antishipping patrols west of the Philippines.
- 9 July 1945: The Cavite detachment was transferred to Puerto Princesa, Palawan, Philippines, with tender support provided by USS Barataria and partially by the shore establishment. This detachment was relieved on 23 July to rejoin the rest of the squadron at Lingayen Gulf assigned to USS Currituck.
- 20 August – 3 September 1945: USS San Pablo arrived on station at Lingayen Gulf to relieve USS Currituck. One half of the squadron shifted to USS San Pablo, and the other half flew to Tawi-Tawi, with tender support provided by USS Pocomoke. USS Pocomoke was relieved by USS Orca on 3 September 1945, and the Tawi-Tawi detachment shifted aboard the latter. During this period, the Lingayen Gulf detachment conducted numerous Dumbo (air-sea rescue) missions. The Tawi-Tawi detachment engaged in antishipping and surveillance patrols for convoys off the approaches to Borneo.
- 22 March 1946: VPB-25 was assigned duty with the occupation forces in Japan through 1 May 1946.
- 28 June 1946: VP-25 was disestablished.

== Aircraft assignments ==
The squadron was assigned to these home ports, effective on the dates shown:

- PBM-3D - 20 April 1944
- PBM-3D2 - 6 February 1945

== Home port assignments ==
The squadron was assigned to these home ports, effective on the dates shown:

- NAAS Harvey Point, North Carolina - 20 April 1944
- NAS Alameda, California - 21 August 1944
- NAS Kaneohe Bay, Hawaii - 15 September 1944
- NAS Kaneohe Bay - May 1946
- NAS Alameda - May 1946

== See also ==
- Maritime patrol aircraft
- List of inactive United States Navy aircraft squadrons
- List of United States Navy aircraft squadrons
- List of squadrons in the Dictionary of American Naval Aviation Squadrons
- History of the United States Navy
