= VP-43 =

U.S. Navy patrol squadron (1944–1949)

Patrol Squadron 43
- Active: 1 July 1944 – 31 March 1949
- Country: United States of America
- Branch: United States Navy
- Type: Squadron
- Role: Maritime patrol
- Engagements: World War II

Aircraft flown
- Patrol: PBM-3D

VP-43 was a patrol squadron of the U.S. Navy. The squadron was established as Patrol Squadron 28 (VP-28) on 1 July 1944, redesignated Patrol Bombing Squadron 28 (VPB-28) on 1 October 1944, redesignated Patrol Squadron 28 (VP-28) on 25 June 1946, redesignated Medium Patrol Squadron (Seaplane) 3 (VP-MS-3) on 15 November 1946, redesignated Patrol Squadron 43 (VP-43) on 1 September 1948 and disestablished on 31 March 1949. It was the third squadron to be designated VP-43, the first VP-43 was redesignated VP-81 on 1 July 1941 and the second VP-43 was redesignated VPB-43 on 1 October 1944.

== Operational history ==
- 1 July 1944 – October 1944: VP-28 was established at NAAS Harvey Point, North Carolina, under the operational control of FAW-5. The squadron was allocated 51 officer and 166 enlisted billets, but was not brought up to a full manning level until the end of the month. The squadron received the first of 15 PBM-3D Mariner seaplanes on 9 July. Within the week, all of the aircraft were evacuated to NAS Banana River, Florida, to avoid damage from a large storm front entering the area. Training had scarcely recommenced when it became necessary to evacuate half of the aircraft again on 1 August 1944 due to a second hurricane. The seven aircraft returned from NAS New York three days later, and the squadron attempted to restart the disrupted training syllabus. Ground school training was given to all hands, with aircrews receiving antisubmarine warfare, torpedo, mine laying and gunnery training.
- 17 August 1944, one crew was forced to ditch in rough open seas, damaging the aircraft beyond economical repair. A hurricane disrupted the training schedule again on 19 October 1944, but did not prevent the squadron from meeting its 29 October 1944 deadline for completion of training.
- 30 October – 7 November 1944: The first flight of five aircraft departed NAAS Harvey Point, via Eagle Pass Army Airfield, Texas, for NAS San Diego, California. Two other flights followed at one-day intervals with all aircraft arriving safely at San Diego by 7 November 1944. Preparation for the trans-Pacific flight to Hawaii, commenced immediately.
- 15 November – 3 December 1944: Three officers and 105 enlisted personnel of the ground support staff departed NAS San Diego by ship for Naval Base Pearl Harbor. On 18 November, the first section of three aircraft departed San Diego for NAS Kaneohe Bay, Hawaii. Two 700 miles (1,100 km) daytime patrols were begun on 25 November, in conjunction with full-time combat training. The last aircraft arrived on 3 December, and the squadron became under the operational control of FAW-2.
- 12 December 1944: VPB-28 experienced its first fatalities when one of the aircraft on patrol went down in heavy seas. The remaining squadron aircraft searched for the missing seaplane for six days, not knowing that SS Cape Lopez had picked up three survivors on 16 December.
- 31 December 1944: A second patrol aircraft crashed at sea with the loss of all hands.
- 20 January 1945: The squadron received its orders to report to FAW-17 at Leyte, Philippines, then on to Lingayen Gulf, where it would be based aboard USS Tangier. The last VPB-28 aircraft arrived on 31 January 1945, with night barrier patrols commencing immediately.
- 8 February – 13 March 1945: VPB-28 was relocated to USS Half Moon and began flying day patrols from Mindoro toward Indochina and Hainan. On 13 February, the squadron moved back aboard USS Tangier, on 27 February 1945, it was relocated to USS Barataria, on 1 March 1945, four crews were put aboard USS Orca and on 13 March 1945, the entire squadron moved back to Tangier.
- 27 June 1945: VPB-28 was split into two detachments, with one remaining at Lingayen Gulf aboard USS Barataria consisting of six planes and eight crews, and the other at the Jinamoc Seaplane Base, Jinamoc Island, San Pedro Bay, Philippines. The Jinamoc detachment, with five aircraft and nine crews, began flying two ASW patrols daily east of Samar, Leyte, and Mindanao.
- 1 July 1945: The squadron had three additional aircraft assigned to Manila, based at NAB Sangley Point, Philippines. One crew was assigned to ferry aircraft between Saipan and Manus. 4 Jul 1945: The Lingayen detachment arrived at Manila to relieve six aircraft from VPB-25 of antisubmarine patrol responsibilities. VPB-28 moved aboard the tender USS San Carlos until USS Barataria could arrive from Lingayen Gulf. The latter duly arrived at Manila Bay on 3 August, and the squadron switched berthing to that vessel. 28 Aug 1945: In a move greeted with relief by all hands, the Manila detachment of the squadron wasmoved to berthing ashore at NAS Sangley Point, Philippines. The squadron remained split into two detachments, with the Jinamoc detachment remaining in place at the seaplane base.
- 22 September 1945: The detachment at NAS Sangley Point, Philippines, joined the detachment at Jinamoc Seaplane Base, placing the operational control of VPB-28 under FAW-10. The squadron remained at the Jinamoc Seaplane Base and by June 1946 experienced a 90 percent turnover as crews rotated back to the U.S.
- 1 April 1948: VP-43 deployed to Japan for occupation duty, returning to Jinamoc on 7 October 1948.
- 31 March 1949: VP-43 was disestablished.

== Aircraft assignments ==
The squadron was assigned the following aircraft, effective on the dates shown:

- PBM-3D - July 1944

== Home port assignments ==
The squadron was assigned to these home ports, effective on the dates shown:

- NAAS Harvey Point, North Carolina - 1 July 1944
- NAS Kaneohe Bay, Hawaii - 3 December 1944
- NAB Jinamoc, Philippines - 27 June 1945

== See also ==
- Maritime patrol aircraft
- List of inactive United States Navy aircraft squadrons
- List of United States Navy aircraft squadrons
- List of squadrons in the Dictionary of American Naval Aviation Squadrons
- History of the United States Navy
