= VPB-17 =

Patrol Bombing Squadron 17
- Active: 3 January 1944 – 30 January 1946
- Country: United States of America
- Branch: United States Navy
- Role: Maritime patrol
- Size: Squadron
- Engagements: World War II

Aircraft flown
- Patrol: PBM-3D

VPB-17 was a Patrol Bombing Squadron of the U.S. Navy. The squadron was established as Patrol Squadron 17 (VP-17) on 3 January 1944, redesignated Patrol Bombing Squadron 17 (VPB-17) on 1 October 1944 and disestablished on 30 January 1946.

== Operational history ==
- 3 January 1944: VP-17 was established at NAS Norfolk, Virginia, as a large seaplane squadron flying 12 PBM-3D Mariners under the operational control of FAW-5. The squadron was relocated on 11 January 1944 to NAS Harvey Point, North Carolina, for flight training. Fitting out and shakedown of squadron personnel and equipment continued through 31 March 1944.
- 31 March 1944: VP-17 was temporarily relocated to NAS Key West, Florida, for continuation of flight training with emphasis on Anti-submarine warfare (ASW). The squadron returned to NAS Harvey Point on 7 April 1944.
- 12 April 1944: An advance party of 2 officers and 45 enlisted personnel proceeded to NAS Alameda, California, by train to prepare for the scheduled arrival of the remainder of the squadron. The remainder of the squadron personnel and equipment arrived with the squadron aircraft on 15 May 1944. Preparations for the trans-Pacific flight to Hawaii were commenced.
- 18 May 1944: VP-17 began departing NAS Alameda for NAS Kaneohe Bay on schedule with all aircraft arriving by 31 May. No problems were encountered en route. While at NAS Kaneohe Bay the squadron operated under the operational control of FAW-2.
- 1 June 1944: After the squadron had settled into its new temporary quarters, it was quickly brought up to operational status and patrols in the vicinity of the Hawaiian Islands were commenced. Additional ASW training was begun on 1 July 1944, continuing until the squadron was deployed to the South Pacific.
- 3 September 1944: VP-17 deployed a detachment of five aircraft to NAB Ebeye, Eniwetok, Marshall Islands, joining VP-21 and sharing quarters aboard the tender USS Casco. The detachment came under the operational control of FAW-1.
- 11 September 1944: A detachment of three aircraft was deployed to Tanapag Harbor, Saipan, with tender support provided by USS Hamlin. The remainder of the squadron from NAS Kaneohe Bay joined this detachment on 17 September 1944, bringing the detachment total to seven aircraft. Sector searches, Dumbo (air-sea rescue) missions, mail delivery and air cargo missions to Palau were assigned by Commander, Patrol Squadrons, FAW-1.
- 5 October 1944: VPB-17 was reassigned temporarily to the tender USS Curtiss in preparation for relocation to Ulithi. Six squadron aircraft departed for Ulithi on 9 October 1944, operating temporarily from the small seaplane tender USS Onslow until USS Hamlin arrived on 13 October 1944. The remaining six aircraft of the squadron arrived on the same date. Anti-shipping patrols in the vicinity of Ulithi were commenced immediately.
- 24 December 1944: VPB-17 was relocated from Ulithi back to Tanapag Harbor, Saipan. Essential maintenance and crew rest was provided in preparation for further deployment.
- 21 January 1945: VPB-17 was en route to Kossol Passage, Palau Islands. On arrival, the squadron was provided support by seaplane tender USS Kenneth Whiting. Sector searches and anti-shipping patrols were commenced upon arrival.
- 5 February 1945: VPB-17 was again relocated to Ulithi, and based temporarily aboard the tender USS Chandeleur.
- 12 February 1945: A detachment of VPB-17 was deployed further south aboard the tender USS Orca, operating out of San Pedro Bay, Philippines, under the operational control of FAW-17. A second detachment was deployed to Lingayen Gulf, berthed temporarily aboard the tender USS Currituck. The remainder of the squadron arrived at San Pedro Bay on 20 February and the crews were relocated to USS San Pablo.
- 9 March 1945: VPB-17 was relocated to Jinamoc Seaplane Base, Philippines, and rejoined by the detachment previously operating from Lingayen Gulf. The base at Jinamoc Island was completed on 31 March 1945, providing berthing and repair facilities ashore for the squadron.
- 11 March 1945: A detachment of eight aircraft was deployed to Puerto Princesa, Palawan Islands. Tender support upon arrival was provided by USS Pocomoke. The detachment remained until 22 April 1945, when it was deployed again to Lingayen Gulf, with tender support provided by USS Tangier. The detachment of four aircraft remaining at Jinamoc rejoined the squadron at Lingayen Gulf on 27 April 1945.
- 7 June 1945: VPB-17 deployed a detachment to Tawi-Tawi, Sulu, Philippines. This group was joined by three additional aircraft on 14 June.
- 15 June 1945: The rest of VPB-17 remained in Lingayen Gulf at Port Sual, Philippines, still aboard USS Tangier. Night searches and attack patrols were conducted from this location against enemy positions and ships until 30 June, when the remainder of the squadron rejoined the detachment at Lingayen. The reunited squadron was relocated aboard USS Currituck.
- 2 July 1945: Eleven squadron aircraft were deployed back to Tawi-Tawi, aboard USS Pocomoke. Patrols were conducted over Balikpapan, Borneo, and Morotai.
- 14 September 1945: VPB-17 was relocated to Jinsen, Korea, operating from the tender USS Currituck. While at this location the squadron operated with the 7th Fleet for duty with the Allied occupation of Korea and the China coast. On the 19th, part of the squadron was ordered to move to Lungwha Airdrome on the Whangpo River, where it was joined by the remainder of the squadron after USS Currituck arrived on 24 September 1945.
- 29 September 1945: VPB-17 was deployed to Taku. USS Currituck and the squadron staff departed, leaving half the squadron at Shanghai and the other half based temporarily aboard USS Barataria. The squadron was reunited at the end of the month at Taku.
- 30 January 1946: VPB-17 was disestablished at NAS San Diego.

== Aircraft assignments ==
The squadron was assigned the following aircraft, effective on the dates shown:

- PBM-3D - January 1944

== Home port assignments ==
The squadron was assigned to these home ports, effective on the dates shown:

- NAS Norfolk, Virginia - 3 June 1944
- NAS Harvey Point, North Carolina - 11 January 1944
- NAS Kaneohe Bay, Hawaii - 18 May 1944
- NAS San Diego, California - January 1946

== See also ==
- Maritime patrol aircraft
- List of inactive United States Navy aircraft squadrons
- List of United States Navy aircraft squadrons
- List of squadrons in the Dictionary of American Naval Aviation Squadrons
- History of the United States Navy
