= Jinamoc Seaplane Base =

World War 2 base

- Part of Leyte-Samar Naval Base
- Jinamoc Island, Basey, Samar, San Pedro Bay, Leyte Gulf, Philippines

Site information
- Type: Military Seaplane Base
- Controlled by: United States Navy
- Condition: Abandoned

Location
- Coordinates: 11°16′10.2″N 125°04′25.0″E

Site history
- Built: 1944
- Built by: Seebees
- In use: 1944–5

Jinamoc Seaplane Base is a former World War II seaplane base on Jinamoc Island, San Pedro Bay, Leyte Gulf, Philippines, part of the Leyte-Samar Naval Base. Construction commenced in December 1944 with grading for a seaplane ramp; a pontoon barge was then floated into position and submerged.

In May 1945 a more permanent 200-foot (61 m) steel and concrete ramp was constructed alongside 1.5 miles (2.4 km) of access roads constructed. Taxiways and hardstands were graded and surfaced. Facilities included 75 quonset huts, a 200-bed dispensary, a water supply and utilities. Jinamoc had already begun operation on 14 January 1945.

US Navy units based here included:

- VP-25 6–25 February 1945
- VP-33 1–16 March 1945
- VP-43 June 1945 – June 1946
- VPB-17 9 March-27 April 1945
- VPB-20 8–26 February 1945

No. 42 Squadron RAAF maintained a detachment at Jinamoc from March to May 1945.

== See also ==
- Tacloban Airfield
