= USS Barataria (AVP-33) =

Tender of the United States Navy

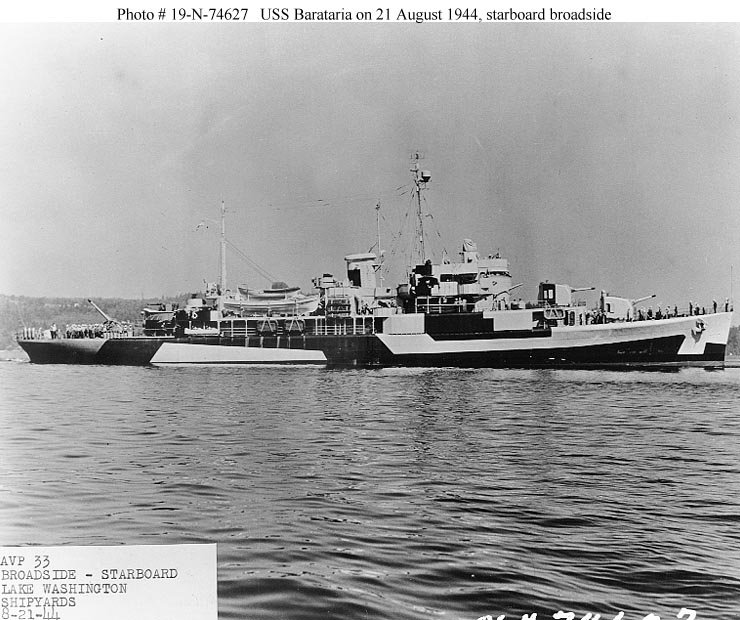
- USS Barataria (AVP-33) off Houghton, Washington, on 21 August 1944

History

United States
- Name: USS Barataria
- Namesake: Barataria Bay on the coast of Louisiana
- Builder: Lake Washington Shipyard, Houghton, Washington
- Laid down: 19 April 1943
- Launched: 2 October 1943
- Sponsored by: Mrs. L. J. Stetcher
- Commissioned: 13 August 1944
- Decommissioned: 24 July 1946
- Stricken: 26 September 1966
- Honors and awards: One battle star for World War II service
- Fate: Loaned to United States Coast Guard 17 September 1948; Transferred outright to Coast Guard 26 September 1966

United States
- Name: USCGC Barataria (WAVP-381)
- Namesake: Previous name retained
- Acquired: Loaned by U.S. Navy 17 September 1948; Transferred permanently to U.S. Coast Guard 26 September 1966
- Commissioned: 10 January 1949
- Decommissioned: 29 August 1969
- Reclassified: High endurance cutter, WHEC-381, 1 May 1966
- Honors and awards: Commander Eastern Area Gunnery Excellence Award 1963; Military Readiness Award 1965
- Fate: Sold for scrapping October 1970

General characteristics (seaplane tender)
- Class & type: Barnegat-class seaplane tender
- Displacement: 1,766 tons (light); 2,592 tons (trial)
- Length: 310 ft 9 in (94.72 m)
- Beam: 41 ft 2 in (12.55 m)
- Draft: 13 ft 6 in (4.11 m) (lim.)
- Installed power: 6,000 horsepower (4.48 megawatts)
- Propulsion: Diesel engines, two shafts
- Speed: 18.2 knots (33.7 km/h)s
- Complement: 215 (ship's company); 367 (including aviation unit)
- Sensors & processing systems: Radar; sonar
- Armament: 3 × 5 in (130 mm) guns; 8 × 40 mm guns; 8 × 20 mm guns; 2 × depth charge tracks
- Aviation facilities: Supplies, spare parts, repairs, and berthing for one seaplane squadron; 80,000 US gallons (300,000 L) aviation fuel

General characteristics (Coast Guard Cutter)
- Class & type: Casco-class cutter
- Displacement: In 1966: 1,786 tons light; 2,522.4 tons (full load)
- Length: 310 ft 9 in (94.72 m) overall; 300 ft 0 in (91.44 m) between perpendiculars
- Beam: 41 ft 2.375 in (12.55713 m) maximum
- Draft: 13 ft 1 in (3.99 m) maximum in 1964
- Installed power: 6,000 bhp (4,500 kW)
- Propulsion: Fairbanks-Morse direct-reversing diesel engines, two shafts; 166,430 US gallons (630,000 L) of fuel
- Speed: 17.35 knots (32.13 km/h) (maximum at full load) in 1966; 11.9 knots (22.0 km/h) (economic) in 1966
- Range: 9,946 nautical miles (18,420 km) at 17.35 knots (32.13 km/h) in 1966; 20,500 nautical miles (38,000 km) at 11.0 knots (20.4 km/h) in 1966
- Complement: In 1966: 151 (10 officers, 3 warrant officers, 138 enlisted personnel)
- Sensors & processing systems: Radars in 1966 (one each): SPS-23, SPS-29A; Sonar in 1966: SQS-1
- Armament: In 1966: one single 5-inch (127 mm) 38-caliber Mark 30 Mod 65, 1 x Mark 52-2 Mod 3 director, 1 x Mark 26-3 fire-control radar; 2 × .50-caliber (12.7 mm) machine guns; 1 × Mark 32 Mod 5 antisubmarine projector, 6 x Mark 10-8 torpedo tubes, Mark 44 torpedoes

The second USS Barataria (AVP-33) was a United States Navy Barnegat-class seaplane tender in commission from 1944 to 1946. She saw service in the later stages of World War II and was decommissioned postwar. She then was transferred to the United States Coast Guard and was in commission as the Coast Guard cutter USCGC Barataria (WAVP-381), later WHEC-381 from 1949 to 1969, serving in the Cuban Missile Crisis and the Vietnam War during her lengthy Coast Guard career.

== Construction, commissioning, and shakedown ==
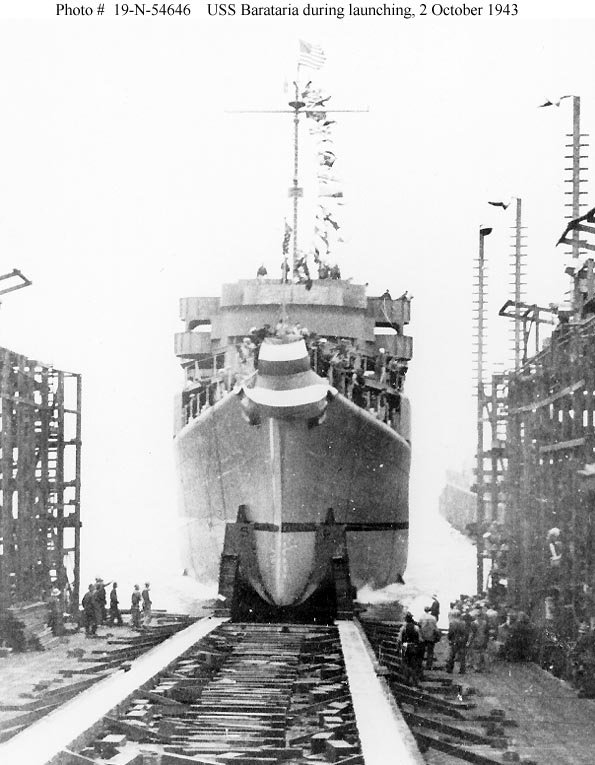
USS Barataria (AVP-33) is launched on 2 October 1943 at Lake Washington Shipyard, Houghton, Washington.

Barataria was laid down on 19 April 1943 at Houghton, Washington, by the Lake Washington Shipyard. She was launched on 2 October 1943, sponsored by Mrs. L. J. Stetcher, and commissioned at her builder's yard on 13 August 1944.

After having spent the remainder of August 1944 in outfitting, loading supplies, and testing and calibrating equipment, Barataria conducted training in tending seaplanes under the auspices of Fleet Air Wing (FAW) 6 at Naval Air Station Whidbey Island at Oak Harbor, Washington. Concluding that training in early September 1944, the ship spent 10 September 1944 through 10 October 1944 in gunnery exercises, casualty drills, sonar training, a speed run, combat information center exercises, and in more seaplane tending operations. Upon completion of the shakedown, she returned to the Puget Sound Navy Yard at Bremerton, Washington, for post-shakedown availability and alterations.

== United States Navy service ==
=== World War II service ===
==== Voyage to the Western Pacific ====
Early in November 1944, Barataria stood out of Bremerton, bound for San Francisco, California, where she took on stores, aircraft maintenance spares, aviation gasoline, and supplies and embarked 39 officers as passengers. She then stood out of San Francisco Bay, bound for Hawaii. Reaching Pearl Harbor, Hawaii, on 28 November 1944, she got underway again on 30 November 1944 and proceeded independently to Eniwetok, which she reached on 7 December 1944. After embarking passengers, Barataria continued again independently to Ulithi Atoll, where she arrived on 12 December 1944, and later fueled from the tanker Octorance.

==== The Philippines campaign ====
Departing from Ulithi as escort and lead ship of a five-ship convoy, Barataria reached the Philippines on 22 December 1944. She spent the remainder of December 1944 and the first few days of January 1945 anchored off Leyte in the San Juanico Strait tending Patrol Bomber Squadron 25 (VPB-25), consisting of 15 Martin PBM-3D Mariner flying boats, whose mission was to conduct daylight searches north and east of Luzon. Shifting to San Pedro Bay, Leyte, on 5 January 1945, Barataria got underway on 6 January 1945 as a screen for the seaplane tender USS Currituck (AV-7) and rendezvoused with Task Force 79 carrying the San Fabian assault forces. Two aircraft rescue boats (ARBs) had been assigned to Barataria, but one of these began taking on water and had to be abandoned and sunk on 8 January 1945. When several kamikaze suicide planes attacked the convoy later that day, Barataria's gunners claimed a "sure assist" for downing one.

On the morning of 9 January 1945, Barataria, joined by Currituck, left the convoy and proceeded to eastern Lingayen Gulf, where Barataria planted seaplane moorings, anchors, and buoys in the shallow waters south of Aringay Point. That afternoon, the planes of Patrol Bomber Squadron 20 (VPB-20) arrived and moored, and Baritaria carried out routine fueling operations for the remainder of the day. On the morning of 10 January 1945, Barataria surveyed the waters off the town of Damortis, south of Aringay Point, and found them free of swells. This information prompted her to move to that area, where she anchored shortly after noon. As the patrol bombers of Patrol Bomber Squadron 17 (VPB-17) arrived that afternoon, one plane sank after a rough landing. Barataria rescued the crew and salvaged some gear. When Japanese mortar fire began falling around the ship at 16:23 hours, Barataria slipped her anchor chain and retired out of range. Meanwhile, one of her 5-inch (127 mm) guns fired nine rounds at the Japanese positions, silencing the mortar fire. After that, Baritaria returned to the anchorage.

For the rest of January 1945, Barataria tended the Consolidated PBY-5A Catalinas of Patrol Bomber Squadron 71 (VPB-71) as they carried out nighttime "Black Cat" strikes against shore installations and shipping along the coast of China and conducted antisubmarine patrol missions. Based first at Cabalitan Bay and then at Sual Bay in southwestern Lingayen GuIf, she shared these seaplane tender duties with Currituck until Currituck departed on 27 January 1945. Barataria then spent from February 1945 to the first two weeks of March 1945 at Cabalitan Bay, establishing a seaplane ramp on the south shore of Cabalitan Island and continuing to tend the Catalinas of VPB-71 as they carried out night reconnaissance and attack missions. The PBM-3D Mariners of Patrol Bomber Squadron 28 (VPB-28) relieved VPB-71 on 28 February 1945 and continued the nocturnal missions begun by the PBYs.

Transferring the seaplane tending duties for VPB-28 to the seaplane tender USS Tangier (AV-8) on 13 March 1945, Barataria stood out of Lingayen Gulf, bound via Subic Bay for Sangley Point, Luzon, and moored there on the morning of 18 March 1945. While at Sangley Point, Barataria serviced the planes of VPB 25, previously tended by the seaplane tender USS San Carlos (AVP-51). The highlight of her service there began when she got underway at 11:16 hours on 26 March 1945 to rescue a VPB-28 plane downed in the South China Sea about 200 nautical miles (370 km) off the coast of Luzon. Guided by search planes, Barataria arrived on the scene at 22:15 hours, lowered her motor whaleboat, and brought the plane crew on board while preparing to fuel the plane for a morning take off attempt or, that failing, to rig a tow. However, neither plan came to fruition. Instead, the destroyer USS Young (DD-580), which ship arrived on the scene shortly after midnight to escort Barataria, sank the plane with gunfire after all classified gear had been removed from it. Barataria then returned to Sangley Point where she spent the remainder of March 1945.

Underway again on 2 April 1945, Barataria headed for Mangarin Bay, Mindoro, to refuel and to replenish her supply of aviation gasoline, before proceeding to Cebu, where she anchored on 4 April 1944. Shifting to a berth off the city of Opon at Mactan Island on 5 April 1945, she there assumed the duties of station tender, Cebu. She surveyed Mactan Island for the establishment of a seaplane ramp and beach facilities, and laid out take off and landing areas in the waters offshore. She also established liaison with the United States Army Air Forces units ashore on both Mactan Island and Cebu. Meanwhile, the United States Army proceeded with the occupation of Cebu. With some isolated exceptions, the fighting centered on an area adjacent to Cebu City, with the "evident strong point being a high point, about three miles (5 km) north of the city" identified as "Hill 25." Army Artillery Control contacted Barataria on 11 April 1945 and asked her to "fire on any available targets." Directed by Army spotters, Barataria expended 100 5-inch (127-mm) rounds over the course of two hours early on 11 April 1945 and shelled Hill 25 again on 12 April 1945, this time sending 75 5-inch (127-mm) rounds into the Japanese position. The Army spotters pronounced her firing "excellent". However, the action was not all one-sided for, at 05:40 hours on 14 April 1945, Barataria came under fire from Japanese 40- and 90-millimeter guns on Cebu Beach, directly opposite Mactan Island. Going to general quarters, she got underway and slipped her anchor cable, standing out of the north channel at 05:49 hours to lie to north of Mactan Island. She returned to her original anchorage later that morning, before moving to a berth in the southern part of Cebu Bay.

Relieved by the seaplane tender USS Heron (AVP-2) on 21 April 1945, Barataria sailed for and anchored off Puerto Princesa, Palawan, on 22 April 1945. She then escorted the seaplane tender USS Pocomoke (AV-9) to Tawi Tawi on 24/25 April 1945, before proceeding on to Guiuan Harbor, Samar, late on the afternoon of 26 April 1945. After taking on board supplies there and fueling at San Pedro Bay, Barataria sailed for Mindoro and anchored in Mangarin Bay on the evening of 3 May 1945.

Pushing on toward Lingayen Gulf, Barataria transferred aviation supplies to USS Tangier on 5 May 1945 before she relieved the seaplane tender USS Orca (AVP-49) on station at noon on 8 May 1945. In so doing, Barataria assumed charge of six planes from VPB-28 engaged in Lingayen Bay-based air-sea rescue operations. For the remainder of May 1945 and all of June 1945, she tended the PBM-5D Mariners of VPB-28 as they carried out "Dumbo" missions covering the Army's Fifth Air Force bombing strikes on Formosa. During May 1945, she also serviced the Royal Australian Air Force 76th Wing Detachment's PBY Catalinas as an "intermediary landing point" in their minelaying operations off the China coast. Early in June 1945, Barataria provided air-sea rescue coverage for the movement of Marine Air Group 14 from Clark Field, Luzon, to Okinawa.

Underway for Puerto Princesa on 8 July 1945, Barataria briefly tended planes of VPB-25, on standby for antisubmarine patrols, before she continued on via Manila, where she took on cargo bound for Puerto Princesa. She conducted tending operations at Puerto Princesa from 15/23 July 1944 before proceeding via Samar to Leyte. She next provided services for VPB-28 as it flew antisubmarine patrols out of Manila Bay, covering the waters adjacent to northern Luzon, for the remainder of World War II.

==== Honors and awards ====
Barataria earned one battle star for her World War II operations.

=== Post-World War II ===
With the end of the fighting on 15 August 1945 came new orders. Barataria cleared Subic Bay on 30 August 1945 bound for Okinawa. and arrived in Buckner Bay, Okinawa, on 3 September 1945 after weathering a typhoon en route. After voyage repairs there, she shifted to Chimu Bay to tend the planes of VPB-17 and VPB-20 as they conducted passenger and mail flights. On 16 September 1945, another typhoon prompted Barataria to get underway to ride out the storm, getting all flyable planes aloft and off the rough seas. Baritaria clocked winds up to 74 knots (137 km/h) and seas up to 40 feet (12.2 m) high before she returned to port on 17 September 1945.

Underway for the coast of China on 24 September 1945, Barataria reached Shanghai on 27 September 1945 and, for the remainder of September, tended the planes of VPB-17, which were flying mail and passengers in and out of Shanghai. Barataria later performed seaplane tending operations out of Jinsen (now Incheon), Korea.

=== Decommissioning ===
After completing her duties at Jinsen, Barataria returned to the United States for inactivation. She reached Seattle, Washington, on 29 December 1945. Decommissioned and placed in reserve on 24 July 1946, Barataria was laid up at Alameda, California.

== United States Coast Guard service ==
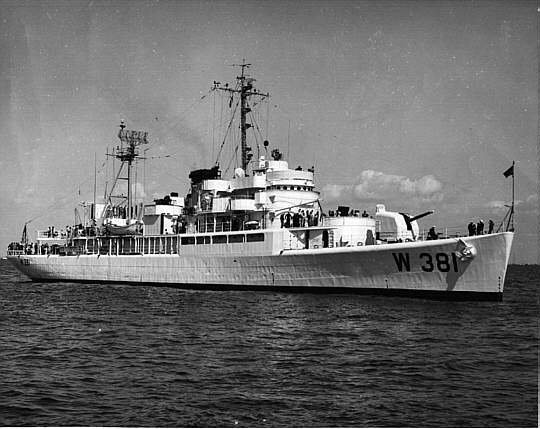
USCGC Barataria (WAVP-381), later WHEC-381, sometime prior to the United States Coast Guard's 1967 adoption of the "racing stripe" markings on its ships.

Barnegat-class ships were very reliable and seaworthy and had good habitability, and the United States Coast Guard viewed them as ideal for ocean station duty, in which they would perform weather reporting and search and rescue tasks, once they were modified by having a balloon shelter added aft and having oceanographic equipment, an oceanographic winch, and a hydrographic winch installed. After World War II, the Navy transferred 18 of the ships to the Coast Guard, in which they were known as the Casco-class cutters.

After she been inactive for more than two years, the U.S. Navy loaned Barataria to the Coast Guard on 17 September 1948. After undergoing conversion for use as a weather-reporting ship, she was commissioned into Coast Guard service as USCGC Barataria (WAVP-381) on 10 January 1949.

=== North Atlantic service 1949-1967 ===
Barataria was stationed at Portland, Maine, on 1 August 1949, and it would remain her home port until January 1968. Her primary duty was to serve on ocean stations to gather meteorological data. While on duty in one of these stations, she was required to patrol a 210-square-mile (544-square-kilometer) area for three weeks at a time, leaving the area only when physically relieved by another Coast Guard cutter or in the case of a dire emergency. While on station, she acted as an aircraft check point at the point of no return, a relay point for messages from ships and aircraft, as a source of the latest weather information for passing aircraft, as a floating oceanographic laboratory, and as a search-and-rescue ship for downed aircraft and vessels in distress, and she engaged in law enforcement operations.

Barataria patrolled the America's Cup Race at Newport, Rhode Island, in September 1962.

When the Cuban Missile Crisis began in October 1962, Barataria was conducting an ocean station patrol on Ocean Station Echo in the shipping lanes east of Cuba. Barataria made contact with a Soviet freighter transporting a cargo of ballistic missiles and was ordered to shadow the freighter and await the arrival of a U.S. Navy warship which would conduct a boarding of the Soviet ship. Barataria remained at battle stations, Condition 2, and repeatedly attempted to establish communications with the Soviet ship. All attempts failed. A U.S. Navy destroyer based at Norfolk, Virginia, arrived and the Navy crew boarded the Soviet vessel.

Barataria won the Commander Eastern Area Gunnery Excellence Award in 1963 and the Military Readiness Award in 1965. On 1 May 1966 she was reclassified as a high endurance cutter and redesignated WHEC-381. On 26 September 1966 her period on loan to the Coast Guard ended when she was stricken from the Naval Vessel Register and transferred permanently to the Coast Guard.

=== Vietnam War service 1967-1968 ===
On 1 April 1967, Barataria departed Portland, Maine, and moved to Pearl Harbor, Hawaii. There she joined four other Casco-class Coast Guard cutters - USCGC Gresham, USCGC Yakutat, USCGC Bering Strait and USCGC Half Moon in forming Coast Guard Squadron Three. All five cutters were former Barnegat-class ships. Gresham became flagship of the squadron, which was designated Task Unit 70.8.6. Captain John E. Day, commander of the squadron, hoisted his pennant aboard Gresham upon activation of the squadron at Pearl Harbor on 24 April 1967.

Coast Guard Squadron Three was tasked to operate in conjunction with U.S. Navy forces in Operation Market Time, the interdiction of North Vietnamese coastal arms and munitions traffic along the coastline of South Vietnam during the Vietnam War. The squadron's other Vietnam War duties included naval gun fire support for ground forces, resupplying Coast Guard and Navy patrol boats and search-and-rescue operations. The cutters departed Pearl Harbor on 26 April 1967 and reported to Commander, United States Seventh Fleet, for Market Time duty on 4 May 1967. They were joined by Navy radar picket destroyer escorts (DERs) of Escort Squadrons 5 and 7.

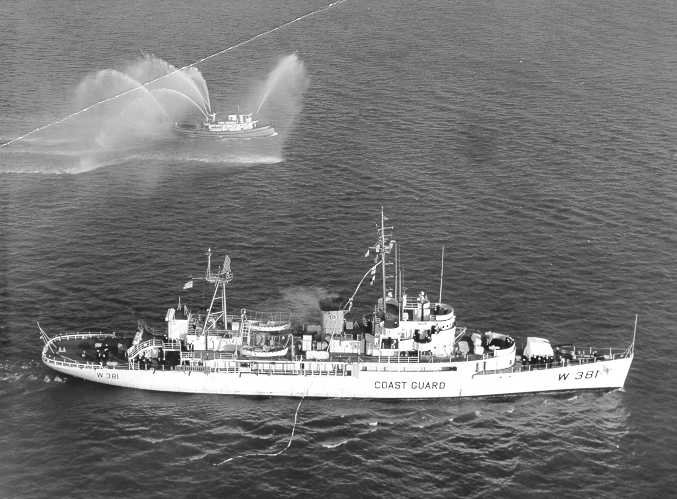
USCGC Barataria (WHEC-381, ex-WAVP-381), entering San Francisco Bay in January 1968 as she returns from her Vietnam War service.

The ten Market Time ships arrived at Subic Bay in the Philippines on 10 May 1967. The five Coast Guard cutters and five Navy destroyer escorts continuously manned four Market Time stations off Vietnam, while only Navy warships served on two Taiwan patrol stations. One ship rotated duty as the station ship in Hong Kong.

During her Vietnam War tour, Barataria was underway 83 percent of the time and cruised over 67,000 nautical miles (124,000 km) without a major mechanical or electrical failure. Keeping a close watch on all moving craft in her surveillance area, Barataria detected, inspected, or boarded nearly 1,000 steel-hulled vessels traversing her area, any one of which could have been a trawler trying to sneak supplies to the enemy.

Barataria was called upon many times to use her main battery against enemy troops ashore who were engaged with allied forces; United States Army spotter planes reported all of Barataria's rounds on target, never once falling out of the target area. On one gunfire support mission, Barataria scored three direct hits on point targets which had been spotted by aircraft.

=== Pacific service 1968-1969 ===
Barataria returned to the United States on 12 January 1968 and was reassigned to San Francisco, California, which was her home port for the remainder of her Coast Guard career. She was used for law enforcement and search and rescue duties in the Pacific Ocean.

On 24 March 1968, Barataria sustained an engine-room explosion off Unimak Island in Alaska's Aleutian Islands.

From 21 May 1969 to 27 May 1969, Barataria rescued the crew of and stood by the Peruvian merchant ship Yavari 960 nautical miles (1,780 km) southwest of San Francisco. Yavari sank before a salvage tug could arrive.

=== Decommissioning and disposal ===
The Coast Guard decommissioned Barataria on 29 August 1969. She was sold for scrapping in October 1970 to N.W. Kennedy Ltd. of Vancouver, British Columbia, Canada.

== Awards ==
During her career, Barataria earned the following awards:

=== U.S. Navy service ===
- China Service Medal (extended)
- American Campaign Medal
- Asiatic-Pacific Campaign Medal with one battle star
- World War II Victory Medal
- Navy Occupation Medal with "ASIA" clasp

=== U.S. Coast Guard service ===
- National Defense Service Medal
- Vietnam Service Medal with two campaign stars

=== Foreign awards ===
- Philippine Liberation Medal with one battle star (Republic of the Philippines — World War II)
- Gallantry Cross Unit Citation (Republic of Vietnam — Vietnam War)
- Vietnam Campaign Medal with 60– Device (Republic of Vietnam — Vietnam War)
