= USS San Pablo (AVP-30) =

Tender of the United States Navy

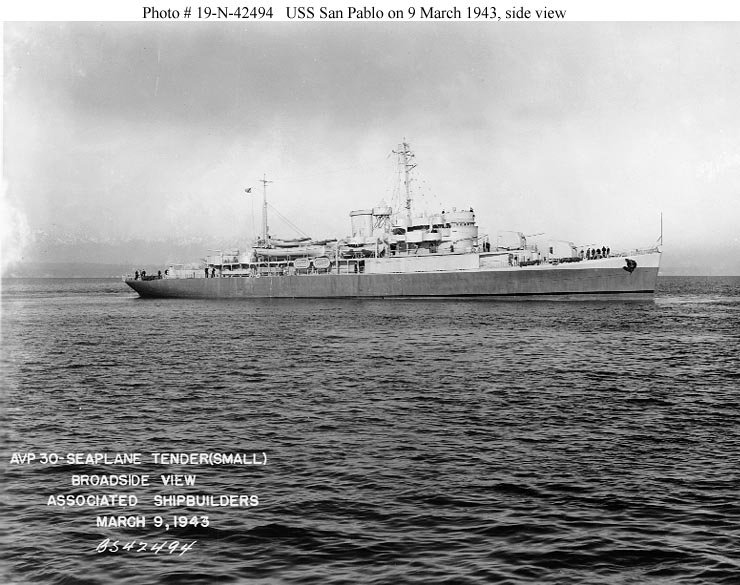
- USS San Pablo (AVP-30) off Seattle Washington, on 9 March 1943, six days before commissioning

History

United States
- Name: USS San Pablo (AVP-30)
- Namesake: San Pablo Bay in California
- Builder: Associated Shipbuilders, Inc., Seattle, Washington,
- Laid down: 2 July 1941
- Launched: 31 March 1942
- Sponsored by: Mrs. W. A. Hall
- Commissioned: 15 March 1943
- Decommissioned: 13 January 1947
- Recommissioned: 17 September 1948
- Reclassified: Hydrographic survey ship, AGS-30, 25 August 1949
- Decommissioned: 29 May 1969
- Stricken: 1 June 1969
- Honors and awards: Four battle stars for World War II service
- Fate: Loaned to private research center 1969; Sold 14 September 1971
- Notes: Served as seaplane tender (AVP-30) 1943–1947; Served as hydrographic survey ship (AGS-30) 1948–1969

General characteristics
- Class & type: Barnegat-class small seaplane tender
- Type: Seaplane tender 1943–1947; Hydrographic survey ship 1948–1969
- Displacement: 1,766 tons (light); 2,750 tons (full load)
- Length: 310 ft 9 in (94.72 m)
- Beam: 41 ft 2 in (12.55 m)
- Draught: 12 ft 7 in (3.84 m)
- Installed power: 6,000 horsepower (4.48 megawatts)
- Propulsion: Diesel engines, two shafts
- Speed: 18.5 knots (34.3 km/h)
- Complement: 215 (ship's company); 367 (including aviation unit)
- Sensors & processing systems: Radar; sonar
- Armament: As built: 2 × single 5 in (130 mm) 38-caliber dual-purpose gun mount; 8 × 40-mm antiaircraft guns; 8 × dual 20-mm antiaircraft guns; 2 × depth charge tracks; Disarmed by the late 1950s
- Aviation facilities: As seaplane tender: Supplies, spare parts, repairs, and berthing for one seaplane squadron; 80,000 US gallons (300,000 L) aviation fuel

USS San Pablo (AVP-30) was a United States Navy Barnegat-class seaplane tender which was in commission as such from 1943 to 1947 and then served as a commissioned hydrographic survey ship, redesignated AGS-30, from 1948 to 1969. Thus far, she has been the only ship of the United States Navy to be named for San Pablo Bay, a shallow northern extension of San Francisco Bay in California.

== Construction and commissioning ==
San Pablo was laid down on 2 July 1941 by Associated Shipbuilders, Inc. of Seattle, Washington. She was launched on 31 March 1942, sponsored by Mrs. W. A. Hall, and commissioned on 15 March 1943.

Following final fitting out, San Pablo conducted shakedown in the Puget Sound area and then steamed to San Diego, California for readiness training.

== World War II service ==
=== Operations at New Caledonia ===
On 15 June 1943, San Pablo departed the United States West Coast and headed for the South Pacific Ocean. She embarked United States Marine Corps personnel and deck cargo at Espiritu Santo, then proceeded to Nouméa, New Caledonia. After offloading there, she went to Brisbane, Australia, to pick up the flight crews and aviation supplies, including spare parts and fuel, of Patrol Squadron 101 (VP-101), then returned to Nouméa to commence operations as tender and base for PBM Mariner and PBY Catalina flying boats conducting "Black Cat" night-fighting, air-search, and reconnaissance missions.

With VP-101 and assigned crash rescue boats, San Pablo formed Task Group 73.1 and established a seaplane base by charting the bay, setting out mooring and marker buoys, and constructing quarters for squadron personnel at nearby Honey Hollow. They also built an advanced base at Samarai in Papua New Guinea. For the next several months, the "Black Cats" operated from these bases, attacking on Japanese shipping along the coasts of New Guinea, New Britain, and New Ireland, and in the Bismarck Sea. They inflicted great losses on Japanese inter-island barge traffic as well as to heavy shipping, harassed Japanese troops with night bombing and strafing missions; conducted photographic intelligence operations, provided at-sea search-and-rescue support for downed United States Army Air Forces fliers and sailors of sunken vessels, and carried high-ranking officers, Allied coast watchers, and native guerrilla units. While continuously on the alert for enemy air attack, San Pablo sailors worked around the clock to fuel, repair, arm, and control the seaplanes and to feed and care for their crews. On 9 October 1943, San Pablo was relieved at Nouméa by seaplane tender USS Half Moon and sailed to Brisbane for long-needed repair, replenishment, and shore leave.

San Pablo returned to Nouméa on 20 December 1943 and resumed operations, this time with Patrol Squadron 52 (VP-52).

=== Operations in the New Guinea campaign ===
During January 1944, she gave direct support to the force which occupied Finschhafen, New Guinea, and helped to establish a new advance base at Langemak Bay, New Guinea. At times, she also tended the planes of Patrol Squadron 34 (VP-34), then flying rescue missions for the United States Army Air Forces Fifth Air Force from Port Moresby, New Guinea. She once temporarily based two OS2U Kingfisher floatplanes from light cruiser USS Boise. From Langemak Bay, San Pablo's planes helped to prevent the Japanese from supplying their garrisons on Rabaul and Kavieng.

On 25 February 1944, relieved again by Half Moon, San Pablo returned to Nouméa for repairs by destroyer tender USS Dobbin. During the work, she assisted in removing a propeller from destroyer-minelayer USS Aaron Ward using her seaplane winch. This speeded repairs to Aaron Ward and allowed her to reach Ulithi Atoll in time to prepare for the forthcoming Okinawa campaign.

By 24 March 1944, San Pablo was conducting operations at Seeadler Harbor in the Admiralty Islands with planes of Patrol Squadron 33 (VP-33) and VP-52 planes. They carried out night bombing missions in the Caroline Islands and search flights by day. The pace had so quickened by the end of March 1944 that seaplane tender USS Tangier was brought in to help carry the load.

On 13 May 1944, San Pablo and Tangier moved to Hollandia, New Guinea, to patrol the approaches to Wakde Island prior to Allied landings there. Relieved by seaplane tender USS Orca on 26 May 1944, San Pablo then refueled PT boats at Humboldt Bay, New Guinea, and transported personnel and cargo between Manus Island, Seeadler Harbor, Emirau, and Mios Woendi. On 19 August 1944, she commenced antisubmarine patrols with Patrol Squadron 11 (VP-11) planes at Mios Woendi and, during October and November 1944, conducted antisubmarine operations off Morotai and Hollandia.

=== Operations in the Philippines campaign ===
Relieved by seaplane tender USS San Carlos, San Pablo moved to Anibongon Bay at Leyte in the Philippine Islands to support planes conducting search missions in the Philippines.

On 8 December 1944, San Pablo received survivors of destroyer USS Mahan who had been picked up by one of San Pablo's PBMs after Mahan had been hit by three Kamikaze suicide aircraft and sank in Ormoc Bay.

In late December 1944, San Pablo joined Convoy "Uncle plus 15" en route to Mindoro and came under severe attack by suicide planes for three consecutive days. Most of the kamikazes were beaten off by antiaircraft fire from the convoy screen or by combat air patrol fighters. However, one hit an ammunition ship, which completely disintegrated in a tremendous explosion, and another crashed into a Liberty ship and caused severe damage. On 30 December 1944 at Mindoro, an Aichi D3A "Val" dive bomber barely passed astern of San Pablo and crashed into motor torpedo boat tender USS Orestes, wounding four San Pablo men with shrapnel. One of these men was 22 year old Ransom Jual Brumback of Grant County, Kentucky. On 31 December 1944, a Mitsubishi G4M "Betty" bomber bombed nearby tanker USS Porcupine and then crashed into destroyer USS Gansevoort.

Through January and early February 1945, San Pablo supported Patrol Bombing Squadron 25 (VPB-25) and VP-33 as their aircraft conducted search missions in the South China Sea and along the China coast. On 13 February 1945, she was relieved by Tangier and returned to Leyte.

Through April 1945, San Pablo escorted landing ship tank USS LST-777, gasoline tanker USS Chestatee, and various merchant ships operating between Leyte and Palawan. She then steamed, via Morotai, to Manus Island. At the end of June 1945, she moved to Samar and the Lingayen Gulf area for air search and rescue operations in the South China Sea and Formosa area. These lasted until 15 August 1945 when she received orders to cease offensive operations upon the cessation of hostilities with Japan.

On 2 September 1945, the day of Japan's formal surrender ceremony, San Pablo was in Lingayen Gulf, with her seaplanes providing antisubmarine patrols to cover occupation convoys bound for Japan.

=== Honors and awards ===
San Pablo earned four battle stars for World War II service.

=== Inactivation and decommissioning ===
After attempting to aid the disabled Boeing 314 flying boat Honolulu Clipper 650 miles (1,050 km) east of Oahu San Pablo arrived at Bremerton, Washington, on 17 November 1945 to prepare for inactivation. She moved to Alameda, California, on 25 March 1946 and remained idle there until decommissioned and placed in reserve on 13 January 1947.

== Service as a hydrographic survey ship ==
=== Conversion and recommissioning ===
Following conversion to a hydrographic survey ship, San Pablo was recommissioned on 17 September 1948 at San Francisco, California. She conducted shakedown training off San Diego from 29 October 1948 to 15 November 1948 and was then ordered to report to the Norfolk Naval Shipyard at Portsmouth, Virginia. She reached Portsmouth on 14 December 1948 and completed fitting out.

=== Initial operations 1949 ===
On 3 February 1949, San Pablo departed in company with hydrographic survey ship USS Rehoboth (AVP-50), also a converted Barnegat-class seaplane tender, for oceanographic work in the western approaches to the Mediterranean Sea. Calling at Ponta Delgada in the Azores, at Plymouth in England, at Gibraltar, and at Bermuda, she returned to the United States, arriving at Philadelphia, Pennsylvania, on 18 April 1949.

Later in 1949, San Pablo conducted two similar cruises to survey and measure ocean currents. During the last of these voyages, she also made a study of the North Atlantic Current. She included in her ports of call Scapa Flow in the Orkney Islands, Oslo, Norway, and Copenhagen, Denmark.

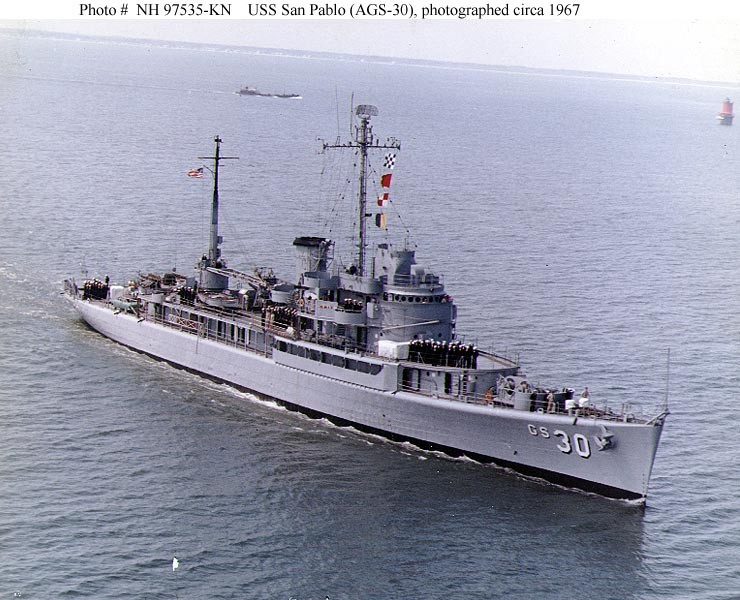
Hydrographic survey ship USS San Pablo (AGS-30) ca. 1967.

=== Redesignation ===
San Pablo was redesignated AGS-30, reflecting her 1948 conversion and change of mission, on 25 August 1949.

=== Later operations 1950–1968 ===
Beginning 18 January 1950, San Pablo conducted a survey of the Gulf Stream and, from 5 June 1950 to 26 June 1950, served as survey headquarters ship for a group of American and Canadian vessels engaged in broad-coverage behavioral studies of that massive current. After a cruise to Casablanca, French Morocco, in July and August 1950, she returned to the United States East Coast to conduct survey operations between New London, Connecticut, and Key West, Florida, for the remainder of 1950.

During 1951, San Pablo conducted oceanographic studies during various cruises, ranging from Scotland to the Mediterranean Sea and along the New England coast in the Narragansett Bay area. Her tasks included making accurate profile studies of the ocean bottom for the purpose of evaluating new sonar devices.

In 1952, she spent the majority of her time in the North Atlantic Ocean, and devoted the latter part of the year to training operations out of Norfolk, Virginia.

From 1953 through 1968, San Pablo alternated between the North Atlantic and the Caribbean Sea, conducting studies on salinity, sound reflectivity, underwater photography techniques, deep-bottom core sampling, bottom profile mapping, and subsurface wave phenomena, as well as work on secret topics. For several months during 1965, she used the port and docking facilities at Rosyth, Scotland, as a temporary home port, courtesy of the British Royal Navy.

=== Inactivation, decommissioning, and final disposition ===
From 1 January 1969 to 29 May 1969, San Pablo underwent inactivation at Philadelphia. She was decommissioned on 29 May 1969 and stricken from the Naval Vessel Register on 1 June 1969.

San Pablo was loaned for a time to the Ocean Sciences Center of the Atlantic in Savannah, Georgia, after which she was sold on 14 September 1971 to Mrs. Margo Zahardis of Vancouver, Washington.
