= List of United States Navy ships present at Pearl Harbor, December 7, 1941 =

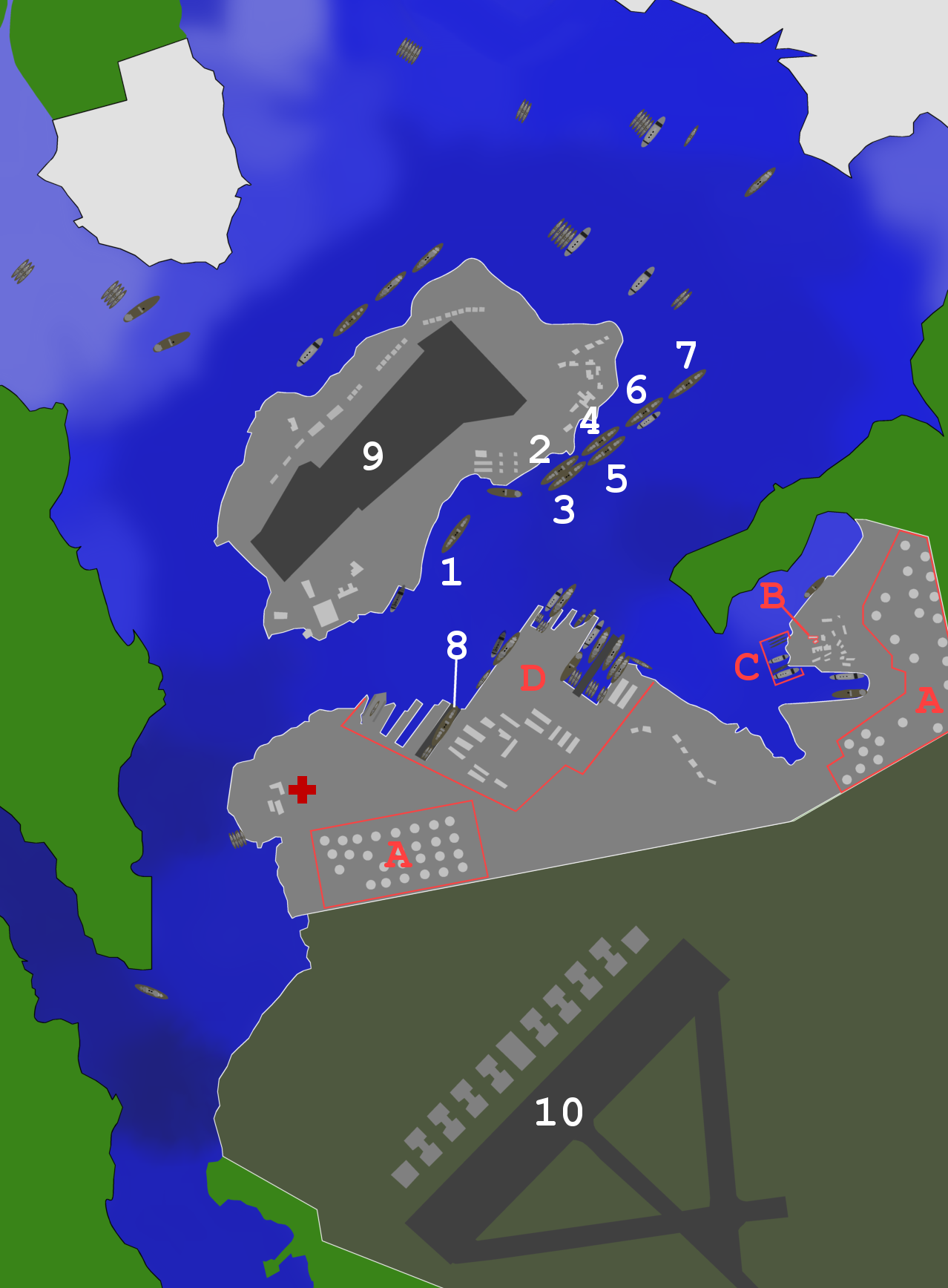
<21 ft 22-23 ft 29 ft 30-32 ft 33-34 ft 34-35 ft 36-37 ft 38-39 ft 40-41 ft 42-48 ft >49 ft City Army base Navy base Targets: 1:USS California 2:USS Maryland 3:USS Oklahoma 4:USS Tennessee 5:USS West Virginia 6:USS Arizona 7:USS Nevada 8:USS Pennsylvania 9:Ford Island NAS 10:Hickam field Ignored: A:Oil storage tanks B:CINCPAC headquarters building C:Submarine base D:Navy Yard

List of United States Navy ships present at Pearl Harbor, December 7, 1941, including commissioned warships and service auxiliaries, but not yard craft assigned to the Fourteenth Naval District. Destroyer Division 80, consisting of the four old destroyers Allen, Chew, Schley, and Ward; USCG cutter Taney; gunboat Sacramento; and auxiliaries Cockatoo, Condor, Crossbill, Reedbird, and Sunnadin were part of Fourteenth Naval District. The remainder listed were assigned to the Pacific Fleet.

== Units ==
Ship Name	Desig	Status	Notes	Links
Pennsylvania	BB-38	Damaged gun, final repairs at Hunters Point	in drydock No. 1, with Cassin and Downes. Three propeller shafts removed.	
Arizona	BB-39	Sunk, total loss, not salvaged	Moored Battleship row, berth F-7 forward of Nevada aft of Tennessee	
Nevada	BB-36	Seriously damaged, beached, salvaged, repaired at Puget Sound	Moored aft of Arizona at berth F-8	
Oklahoma	BB-37	Sunk, total loss, raised, and later sank in 1947 while under tow to San Francisco.	Moored Battleship row, outboard of Maryland at berth F-5, forward of West Virginia	
Tennessee	BB-43	Relatively minor damage, repaired by February 1942	Moored starboard side to berth F-6, next to West Virginia and forward of Arizona	
California	BB-44	Sunk, floated, rebuilt by January 1944 at Puget Sound	Moored starboard side to, at berth F-3.	
Maryland	BB-46	Damaged, two bomb hits, repaired by February 26, 1942 at Puget Sound	Moored on Battleship row, inboard of Oklahoma at berth F-5, forward of Tennessee	
West Virginia	BB-48	Sunk, floated, rebuilt by July 1944 at Puget Sound	Moored outboard of Tennessee at berth F-6, forward of Arizona	
New Orleans	CA-32	Minor damage, repaired at Pearl Harbor and Mare Island	Moored at Berth B-16, Navy Yard Pearl Harbor undergoing engine repairs	
San Francisco	CA-38	Undamaged	Under overhaul at the Pearl Harbor Navy Yard berth B-17	
Raleigh	CL-7	Damaged by torpedo, repaired at Pearl Harbor and Mare Island	Moored at berth F-12, forward of Utah, aft of Detroit	
Detroit	CL-8	Undamaged	Moored at berth F-13, aft of Raleigh	
Phoenix	CL-46	Undamaged	Berth C-6	
Honolulu	CL-48	Minor damage from a bomb near miss	Moored at berth B-21, Navy Yard, with St. Louis outboard	
St. Louis	CL-49	Minor bullet hits	Moored outboard of Honolulu at Berth B-21, Navy Yard,	
Helena	CL-50	Seriously damaged, repaired by mid-1942 at Mare Island	Moored at berth B-2 Naval station with Oglala	
Allen	DD-66	Undamaged	Moored to Chew, Solace nearby to port, berth X-5.	
Schley	DD-103	Undamaged	Moored in a nest of ships undergoing overhaul in berth B-20, unarmed.	
Chew	DD-106	Undamaged	berthed at X-5 to Allen	
Ward	DD-139	Undamaged	patrolling channel entrance to Pearl Harbor	
Dewey	DD-349	Undamaged	moored berth X-2 with Phelps, MacDonough, Worden, Hull and Dobbin	
Farragut	DD-348	Undamaged	Moored at Berth X-14 with Aylwin, Farragut, Dale and Monaghan (starboard to port)	
Hull	DD-350	Very minor damage from a bomb near-miss	berth X-2, nested with Dobbins, Dewey, Worden, MacDonough, and Phelps	
Macdonough	DD-351	Undamaged	berth X-2, nested with Dobbins, Hull, Dewey, Worden and Phelps	
Worden	DD-352	Undamaged	moored Berth X-2, undergoing routine upkeep alongside portside of the Dobbin. Nested to portside were Hull, Phelps, Dewey and MacDonough	
Dale	DD-353	Undamaged	Moored at Berth X-14 with Aylwin, Farragut, Dale and Monaghan (starboard to port)	
Monaghan	DD-354	Undamaged	Moored at Berth X-14 with Aylwin, Farragut, Dale and Monaghan (starboard to port)	
Aylwin	DD-355	Minor damage to propeller	berthed at buoy X-18 with Dale to port, followed by Farragut and Monaghan	
Selfridge	DD-357	Undamaged	nested with Conyngham, Tucker, Case and Reid, undergoing repairs alongside Whitney at berth X-8	
Phelps	DD-360	Undamaged	berth X-2 undergoing tender overhaul, nested with Hull, Dewey, Worden, MacDonough, and Dobbins	
Cummings	DD-365	Minor damage from bomb fragments	nested at berth B-15; order of the ships from the pier outboard – Tracy, Preble, Cummings	
Reid	DD-369	Undamaged	nested with Conyngham, Tucker, Case and Selfridge, undergoing repairs alongside Whitney at berth X-8	
Case	DD-370	Undamaged	moored starboard side of Whitney at berth X-8. Nested with Conyngham, Reid, Tucker, Case and Selfridge moored alongside to port	
Conyngham	DD-371	Undamaged	moored starboard side to Whitney at berth X-8. Reid, Tucker, Case and Selfridge were nested outboard.	
Cassin	DD-372	Heavily damaged, considered lost, but rebuilt with new parts by February 5, 1944 at Mare Island with new parts	in drydock next to Downes, forward of Pennsylvania	
Shaw	DD-373	Heavily damaged, lost bow, repaired by July 1942 at Mare Island.	in floating drydock YFD-2 sunk	
Tucker	DD-374	Undamaged	moored with Whitney, Reid, Conyngham, Case and Selfridge at berth X-8.	
Downes	DD-375	Heavily damaged, considered lost, but rebuilt and recommissioned November 15, 1943 at Mare Island	in drydock next to Cassin forward of Pennsylvania	
Bagley	DD-386	Minor damage from nearby explosions	Berth B-22, Navy Yard Pearl Harbor	
Blue	DD-387	Undamaged	Berth X-7	
Helm	DD-388	Minor damage by two bomb near-misses	Underway from berth X-7 just prior to attack, en route to deperming buoys at West Loch	
Mugford	DD-389	Undamaged	moored port side to the Sacramento, in berth B-6, at the Navy Yard	
Ralph Talbot	DD-390	Undamaged	moored bow to southward to buoy X-11 with the Patterson alongside to port and the Henley to starboard.	
Henley	DD-391	Minor damage from strafing	Moored with Patterson and Ralph Talbot	
Patterson	DD-392	Undamaged	moored at berth X-11 with Henley and Ralph Talbot	
Jarvis	DD-393	Undamaged	moored port side to Mugford at berth B-6 Navy Yard Pearl Harbor, during a restricted availability period	
Narwhal	SS-167	Undamaged	moored in berth S-9 at the Submarine Base	
Dolphin	SS-169	Undamaged	moored port side to, Pier #4, in Berth S-8, U.S. Submarine Base	
Cachalot	SS-170	Undamaged	moored at berth B-1, Navy Yard, undergoing scheduled overhaul	
Tautog	SS-199	Undamaged	moored at pier two, U.S. Submarine Base	
Oglala	CM-4	Sunk, salvaged, upgraded and recommissioned February 1944 at Mare Island	Moored alongside Helena at berth B-2	
Turkey	AM-13	Undamaged	moored in a nest at the Coal Dock with Rail, Bobolink, and Vireo	
Bobolink	AM-20	Undamaged	moored in a nest at the westerly end of the Coal Docks with Vireo and Turkey inboard, and Rail outboard.	
Rail	AM-26	Undamaged	moored in a nest at the Coal Dock with Turkey, Bobolink, and Vireo	
Tern	AM-31	Undamaged	moored berth B-5 (north end of 1010 dock) undergoing upkeep alongside Argonne	
Grebe	AM-43	Undamaged	berth B-20, Navy Yard, alongside Schley	
Vireo	AM-52	Undamaged	moored inboard at the Coal Dock, bow to seaward, with Turkey, Bobolink, and Rail moored outboard	
Gamble	DM-15	Undamaged	moored in berth D-3, Middle Loch, in nest with division, order of ships from starboard Ramsay, Breese, Montgomery, and Gamble	
Ramsay	DM-16	Undamaged	moored in berth D-3, Middle Loch, in nest with division, order of ships from starboard Ramsay, Breese, Montgomery, and Gamble	
Montgomery	DM-17	Undamaged	moored in berth D-3, Middle Loch, in nest with division, order of ships from starboard Ramsay, Breese, Montgomery, and Gamble	
Breese	DM-18	Undamaged	moored in berth D-3, Middle Loch, in nest with division, order of ships from starboard Ramsay, Breese, Montgomery, and Gamble	
Tracy	DM-19	Undamaged	moored portside to berth B-15, Navy Yard, unarmed, disabled, undergoing overhaul. Preble and Cummings were moored to starboard in that order.	
Preble	DM-20	Undamaged	moored in berth B-15, undergoing scheduled overhaul, no arms on board. Nest order of ships from the pier outboard – Tracy, Preble, Cummings	
Sicard	DM-21	Undamaged	Moored starboard side to Pruitt in berth B-18 Navy Yard undergoing overhaul.	
Pruitt	DM-22	Undamaged	moored at berth B-18, Navy Yard, undergoing routine overhaul. Sicard and Ontario moored to port in that order.	
Zane	DMS-14	Undamaged	moored bow and stern in a nest with Mine Division Four at buoys D-7 and D-7s; order from port to starboard: Trever, Wasmuth, Zane, and Perry.	
Wasmuth	DMS-15	Undamaged	moored bow and stern in a nest with Mine Division Four at buoys D-7 and D-7s; order from port to starboard: Trever, Wasmuth, Zane, and Perry.	
Trever	DMS-16	Undamaged	moored at buoys D-7 and D-7-S, bow towards Pearl City, in the following order from north, Trever, Wasmuth, Zane, and Perry	
Perry	DMS-17	Undamaged	moored at buoy D-7, in the following order from north, Trever, Wasmuth, Zane, and Perry	
Sacramento	PG-19	Undamaged	moored port side to berth B-6, Navy Yard with Mugford and Jarvis moored alongside to starboard.	
Dobbin	AD-3	Minor damage	berth X-2, nested with Hull, Dewey, Worden, MacDonough, and Phelps	
Whitney	AD-4	Undamaged	moored bow and stern to buoys X-8 and X-8S with Conyngham, Reid, Tucker, Case and Selfridge moored alongside to port	
Curtiss	AV-4	Suffered bomb damage, repaired San Diego, back to Pearl Harbor by January 13, 1942	moored in berth X-22	
Tangier	AV-8	Minor damage by several bomb near-misses	berthed at F-10, Ford Island, with ship's head bearing 230° true; Utah moored at F-11 directly astern; Raleigh at F-12	
Avocet	AVP-4	Undamaged	moored at berth F-1, Naval Air Station Dock	
Swan	AVP-7	Undamaged	resting on the Marine Railway dock, in boiler upkeep	
Hulbert	AVD-6	Undamaged	moored berth S-3 at the Submarine Base	
Thornton	AVD-11	Undamaged	moored port side to dock at berth S-1, Submarine Base	
Pyro	AE-1	Minor damage due to a near-miss from a dive bomber	moored starboard side to West Loch dock.	
Ramapo	AO-12	Undamaged	moored in Berth B-12, aft of Rigel, starboard side to, under the large crane	
Neosho	AO-23	Undamaged, moved to berth M-3 Merry Point at 0930	moored, starboard side to, in Berth F-4, Naval Air Station, Ford Island (aft of California)	
Medusa	AR-1	Undamaged	moored berth X-23 near Curtiss	
Vestal	AR-4	Damaged, struck by 2 bombs and adjacent to Arizona during explosions, repaired self at Pearl Harbor	moored port side to the port side of the Arizona at F-7	
Rigel	AR-11	Minor damage from bomb near-misses	moored in berth B-13, Navy Yard, unarmed and undergoing major repairs and conversion, forward of Ramapo	
Pelias	AS-14	Undamaged	moored at submarine Base dock	
Widgeon	ASR-1	Undamaged	berthed at the submarine base	
Solace	AH-5	Undamaged	moored berth X-4. Moved to berth X-13 at 0900.	
Castor	AKS-1	Undamaged	berthed at Merry Point berth M-4, near Sumner	
Antares	AKS-3	Undamaged, docked at Honolulu at 1146	Operating at harbor entrance	
Ontario	AT-13	Undamaged	moored in berth B-18, Repair Basin, Pearl Harbor outboard of the Sicard, undergoing an overhaul	
Keosanqua	AT-38	Undamaged	Operating at harbor entrance with Antares	
Utah	AG-16	Sunk, total loss, salvage stopped, war grave memorial	moored at Berth F-11, between Raleigh forward and Tangier astern	
Argonne	AG-31	Minor damage from strafing	Moored at berth B-5, north end of 1010 Dock.	
Sumner	AG-32	Minor injuries to gun crews incurred while firing on aircraft	Moored to the new dock at the southern end of the Submarine Base, port side to, bow to eastward	
Cockatoo	AMc-8	Undamaged		
Crossbill	AMc-9	Undamaged	Returned to harbor from sweeping 0525	
Condor	AMc-14	Undamaged	Returned to harbor from sweeping 0525	
Reedbird	AMc-30	Undamaged		
Sunnadin	AT-28	Undamaged		
USCGC Taney		Undamaged. Moored in Honolulu harbor.	On July 25, 1941, the Coast Guard cutter was transferred to the Navy and reported for duty with the local defense forces of the 14th Naval District (Destroyer Division 80).	
Hoga	YT-146	Undamaged during attack		
Sotoyomo	YT-9	Damaged by Shaw explosions and fires; completely submerged; but repaired and returned to service.	In floating dry dock, YFD-2, with Shaw undergoing overhaul.	,
Baltimore	Receiving Ship	Undamaged during attack	Later sold and scuttled.	

== See also ==
- Attack on Pearl Harbor
- USCGC Taney (WHEC-37)
- USS Ash
