= USS Tangier (AV-8) =

Tender of the United States Navy

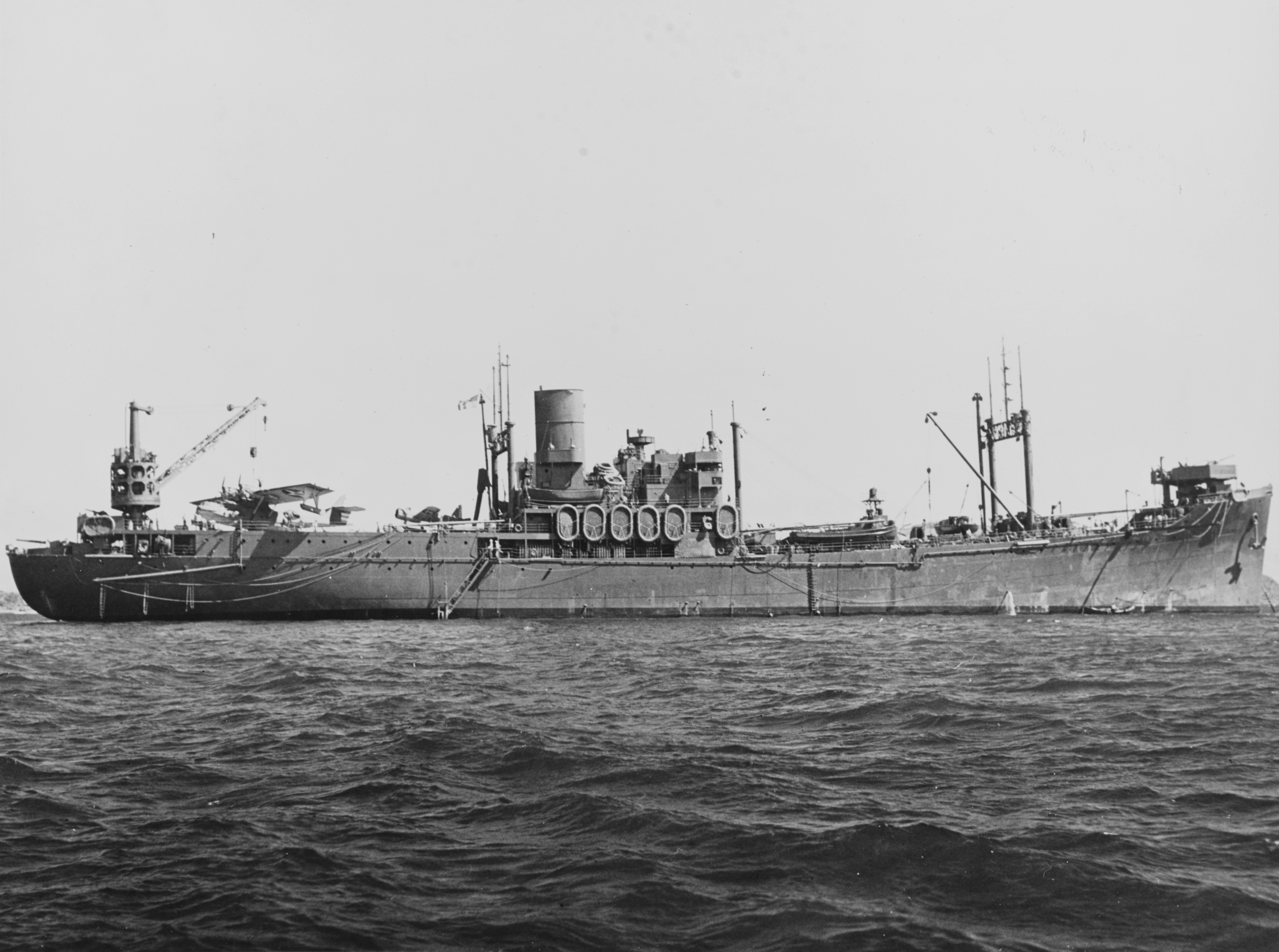
- Tangier in April 1942.

History

United States
- Name: Sea Arrow (1939—1940); Tangier (1940—1961); Detroit (1962—1974)
- Namesake: Tangier Island in Virginia and Tangier Sound in Maryland
- Builder: Moore Dry Dock Company, Oakland, California
- Yard number: 195
- Laid down: 18 March 1939
- Launched: 15 September 1939
- Acquired: 8 July 1940
- Commissioned: 25 August 1941
- Decommissioned: c. January 1947
- Stricken: 1 June 1961
- Honors and awards: 3 Battle Stars
- Fate: Sold to Union Minerals & Alloys Corporation, 17 November 1961

United States
- Name: Detroit (1962—1974)
- Operator: Sea-Land Service
- Acquired: 15 May 1962
- Fate: Scrapped, 1974

General characteristics Sea Arrow (as built)
- Type: MC type C-3 cargo
- Tonnage: 7,680 GRT; 5,450 NRT; 11,920 DWT
- Length: 492 ft (150.0 m) (overall); 465 ft (141.7 m) LBP
- Beam: 69 ft 6 in (21.18 m)
- Draft: 28 ft 7.5 in (8.7 m) (full load)
- Depth: 33 ft 6 in (10.2 m)
- Capacity: 686,365 cubic feet (19,435.7 m^{3}) (5 holds & 'tween deck); 12 passengers
- Crew: 43

General characteristics as Tangier
- Type: After conversion to Seaplane tender
- Displacement: 11,760 long tons (11,950 t)
- Length: 492 ft 1 in (149.99 m)
- Beam: 69 ft 6 in (21.18 m)
- Draft: 23 ft 9 in (7.24 m)
- Speed: 18.4 kn (21.2 mph; 34.1 km/h)
- Complement: 1,075 officers and men
- Armament: 1 × 5 in (127 mm)/38 cal. dual purpose gun; 4 × 3 in (76 mm)/50 cal. dual purpose guns; 8 × Bofors anti-aircraft guns

The second USS Tangier (AV-8) was a Maritime Commission type C-3 cargo ship, converted to a seaplane tender in the United States Navy during World War II. The ship, the first of the C-3s to be launched and significant in a revival of Pacific coast shipbuilding, was launched 15 September 1939 and delivered to the Maritime Commission as Sea Arrow. The ship was acquired by the U.S. Navy during completion before any commercial service, put back into the builder's yard, and converted to a seaplane tender during 1940. After spending over a year in conversion the ship was commissioned on 25 August 1941.

Tangier was present during the Attack on Pearl Harbor that drew the United States into World War II and saw service throughout the Pacific until the end of the war. The vessel was placed in reserve January 1947 at Philadelphia and remained in reserve until 1961 when sold for mercantile use. Renamed Detroit in 1962 and converted to a car carrier/container ship. In October 1974 the vessel was sold for scrap and broken up at Valencia, Spain.

== Pacific Coast C-3s ==
Sea Arrow was the first C-3 type and first vessel with high pressure steam plant installation, fireproof construction, and over half the hull welded construction to be built on the Pacific coast. Successful construction of the first ship answered questions raised about whether Pacific coast shipyards could find enough skilled labor, particularly mechanics to install high pressure engineering plants, to compete. Moore was contracted to build four ships, yard hulls 195 through 198, Maritime Commission hulls 51–52 and then 136–137 with the intervening MC hulls being built in the east. The prospect of war caused rapid changes in the destiny of these vessels with name changes during construction that are confusing.

Sea Arrow was immediately acquired by the Navy and renamed with the other three hulls being designated after launch or still under construction for Moore-McCormack Lines. The second and third ships were christened Sea Star and Sea Panther but were renamed Mormacsea and Mormacstar with the fourth being named Mormacsun before launch. Ex Sea Star/Mormacsea became USS Elizabeth C. Stanton (AP-69). Mormacsun was also acquired by the Navy and became USS Florence Nightingale (AP-70). The Moore Dry Dock Sea Panther, renamed Mormacstar, got renamed again to Mormacsea. To truly confuse matters the Moore Dry Dock Sea Panther duplicated the name of MC hull 40 launched by Federal Shipbuilding of New Jersey that became USS Hamul (AD-20) with a later ship, MC hull 390 built in Mississippi, also being named Sea Panther.

Pacific coast interests had been pressing the Maritime Commission to begin awarding contracts for new shipbuilding programs to Pacific yards. The launch of Sea Arrow was seen as the beginning of a revival of the industry. As a result, the launch drew considerable attention and presence of business figures speaking and among the 680 invited guests.

=== Construction ===
The ship was laid down under a Maritime Commission contract (MC hull 51) as Sea Arrow on 18 March 1939 at Oakland, California by Moore Dry Dock Company; launched on 15 September 1939; sponsored by Mrs. Joseph R. Sheehan. (Note: Joseph R. Sheehan was President of American President Lines.) The launch, six weeks ahead of schedule and a month before the first C-3 in an Atlantic coast yard, was the first of the C-3s launched. A feature of the launch was a painting of giant eyes around the plugged hawse pipes. The keel for the second C-3 was prefabricated and immediately placed on the ways. (Note: See photos on pages 39 and 40 of the October 1939 reference for the eyes and the crane ready to lay the keel of the second ship as Sea Arrow awaits launch.)

Sea Arrow completed trials with almost no problems even though the geared turbines had been delayed with a rushed installation and had been the yard's first high pressure steam installation. Sea Arrow, renamed Tangier designated AV-8 on 3 June 1940, was delivered to the Maritime Commission 8 July 1940 and immediately purchased by the Navy, commissioned in ordinary, and put back into the Moore Dry Dock yard for the extensive modifications required for Navy purposes.

== Service history ==
Tangier, under the command of Commander and future Vice Admiral Clifton A. F. Sprague, (Note: Later Rear Admiral Sprague in command of Task Unit 77.4.3 ("Taffy 3"), the escort carriers that turned back the much heavier Japanese forces at the Battle off Samar. There is some additional but uncited information about Tangier in the article about the admiral.) remained at Oakland for over a year undergoing conversion to a seaplane tender. Finally, on 25 August 1941, she went into full commission and put to sea on her shakedown cruise. At the completion of shakedown training, she was assigned as tender to Patrol Wing 2 (PatWing 2), based in Hawaii. Tangier arrived at Pearl Harbor on 3 November and moored at berth F-10 forward of the former battleship Utah directly astern at F-11. (Note: DANFS is apparently in error with Utah being "abaft" considering the heading, berth and "directly astern" given in the action report. See too List of United States Navy ships present at Pearl Harbor, December 7, 1941.) Utah was serving as an anti-aircraft training ship. There, she spent the last month of peacetime caring for her complement of seaplanes.

=== Pearl Harbor and Wake Island ===
At 07:55 on the morning of 7 December 1941, the first of two waves of Japanese carrier-based aircraft swooped in on the Pacific Fleet, moored at Pearl Harbor. Tangier at berth F-10 and commanded by Commander Sprague was in the fight from the beginning. Her klaxon sounded general quarters three minutes later, and by 08:00 her anti-aircraft batteries opened up on the Japanese. At 0803 torpedoes hit Utah and a minute later USS Raleigh (CL-7) at berth F-12 was hit by a bomb. At 0811 Utah rolled over. By 0830 Tangier was ready for getting underway and lines were singled by 0850 but the ship did not get underway. During the ensuing melee, Tangier's gunners claimed three enemy aircraft and hits on a midget submarine which had penetrated the harbor's defenses. She and another seaplane tender—Curtiss—shelled the submarine, but the destroyer Monaghan finished it off with a two-pronged attack, subjecting it to a ramming and following up with a cascade of depth charges. By 09:20, the skies were clear of aircraft, and only the smoke from the burning ships and shore installations remained. Tangier began rescuing survivors from the capsized Utah.

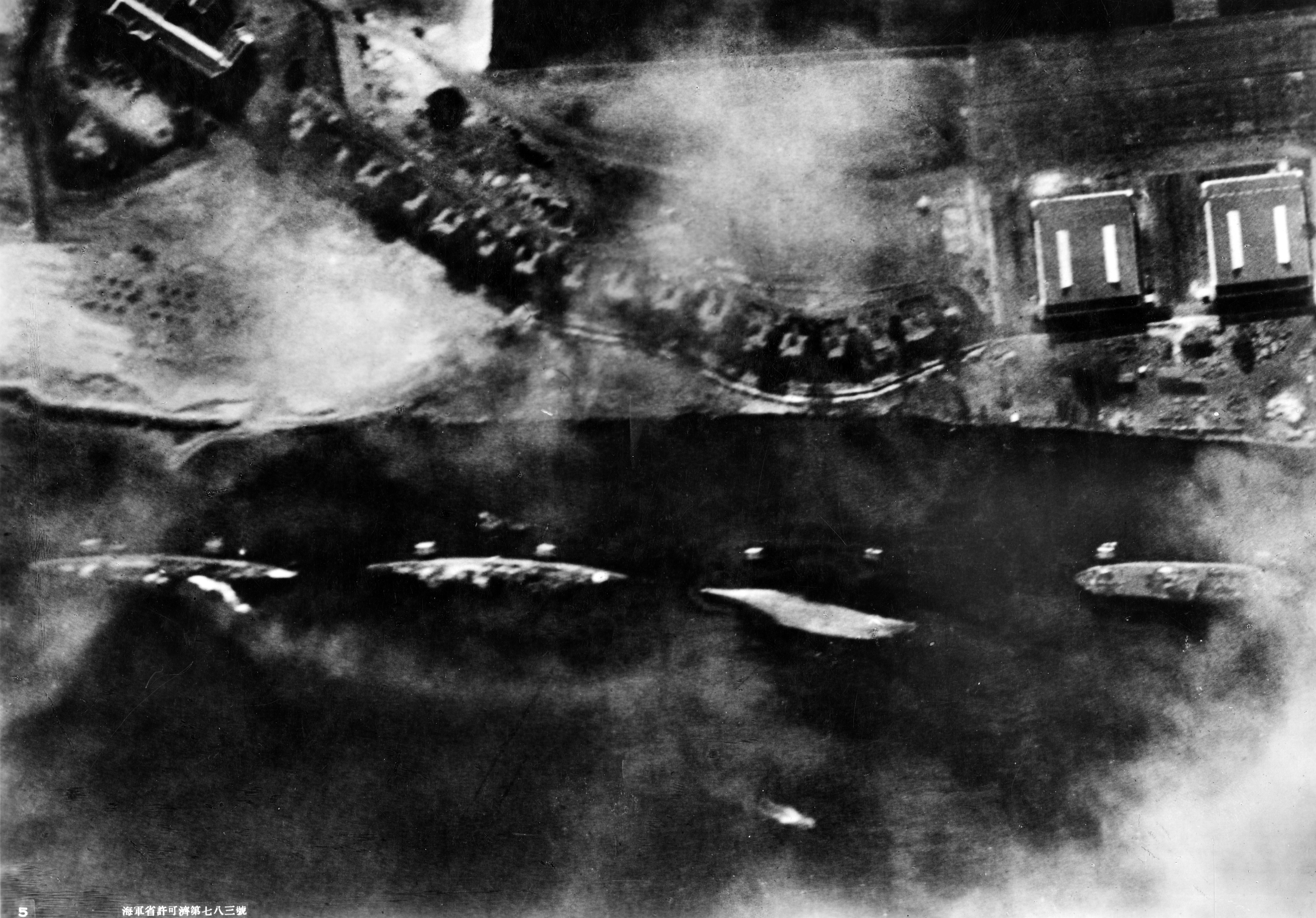
7 December 1941: Photograph taken from a Japanese Navy plane during the attack. Ships are (from left to right): Detroit (CL-8), Raleigh (CL-7) (listing), Utah (AG-16) (capsized) and Tangier (AV-8),

In the air were aircraft from Tangier, among them a PBY-5 Catalina aircraft that was conducting an assigned search mission on 7 December 1941. This aircraft was attacked by a formation of approximately nine enemy aircraft and succeeded in defeating the surprise attack and landing safely, only to discover the devastation on land after the bombing of Pearl Harbor.

During the next few days, it became apparent that the Japanese would soon attempt a landing on Wake Island, a strategic American outpost located almost astride the 20th parallel, some two-thirds of the way from Oahu to Guam and almost due north of the Marshall Islands. By mid-December, Tangier was loaded with supplies, ammunition, and equipment for the desperate but thus far victorious defenders of Wake Island. Then, she rode idly at anchor for two days while the aircraft carrier Saratoga—around which the Wake relief force was to be built—steamed to Pearl from San Diego. Saratoga entered Pearl Harbor on 15 December, and Tangier departed the same afternoon in company with the fleet oiler Neches and a destroyer division while the carrier refueled. Saratoga caught up to the slow-moving little convoy on 17 December, and the task force advanced on Wake. However, the relief expedition was ordered back to Oahu after a Japanese force of at least two fleet carriers and two heavy cruisers were spotted headed for Wake. On 23 December after a three-day struggle, the Wake defenders succumbed. Tangier sailed via Midway Island, where she disembarked the men and equipment of Marine Fighting Squadron 221 (VMF-221) to bolster that island's defenses and embarked civilian evacuees. She returned to Pearl Harbor on the last day of 1941.

=== Coral Sea ===
On 11 February 1942, Tangier put to sea again and headed, via Pago Pago and Suva, to New Caledonia. She arrived in Noumea on 3 March and relieved Curtiss as tender for six PBY Catalina flying boats. For the next three and one-half months, she performed routine tender services for PBYs flying long-range searches to the north of New Caledonia, almost as far as the lower Solomons. In late April and early May, her group of seaplanes was increased to 12 in anticipation of a fleet action in the Coral Sea. When the battle came to pass, however, her planes had to content themselves with rescuing survivors of the destroyer Sims and oiler Neosho, sunk on 7 May by the Japanese who mistook them for a cruiser and carrier, respectively, and of the torpedoed Greek freighter SS Chloe. The search continued until 13 May, days after the end of the crucial battle. Coral Sea was a tactical victory for the Japanese—the U.S. Navy lost more tonnage—but a strategic victory for the U.S. It stopped the southward advance of Imperial Japanese forces and set the stage for the American victory in the Battle of Midway by temporarily robbing the Japanese of two of their newest fleet carriers: Shōkaku and Zuikaku. Shōkaku was incapacitated by battle damage, and Zuikaku lost a high percentage of her veteran aviators.

After their rescue operations for survivors of Allied ships lost in the Coral Sea action, Tangier's planes resumed normal search operations. On 30 May, two of her planes were forced down at sea by fuel shortage, and a third crashed near Maré Island in the Loyalty group. Destroyer Meredith went out to aid the two planes. One was refueled and returned safely, but the other could not take off and had to be sunk. The crew of the third plane reached safety at Mare Island. On 20 June, Tangier was relieved by Curtiss and, the following day, got underway for the west coast. She reached Pearl Harbor on Independence Day 1942 and stood out again three days later. On the 15th, she arrived in San Francisco and immediately began overhaul.

=== 1943 ===
Tangier completed overhaul in September and, after loading aviation equipment at the Alameda Naval Air Station, departed San Francisco for Pearl Harbor, Suva, and ultimately Espiritu Santo, where she arrived on 28 February 1943. There, she unloaded her stores and commenced tending seaplanes. She continued routine operations until 12 August, when she got underway for Pearl Harbor. Tangier made Oahu on 28 August. In September–October, she made two voyages from Pearl Harbor to American Samoa and one to San Diego, before returning to Espiritu Santo on 6 November with a load of aviation cargo. On 14 November, she headed back to the U.S., arriving in San Diego on 3 December for another yard overhaul.

=== 1944 ===
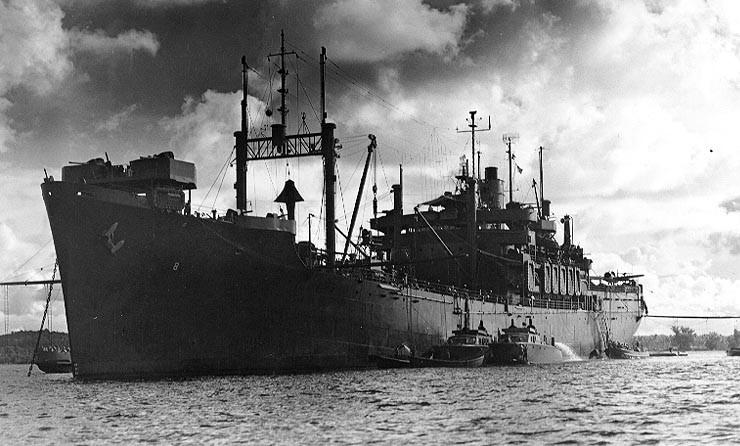
Tangier at anchor, July 1944, Seeadler Harbor, Manus.

On 21 February 1944, Tangier again headed west. She reached Espiritu Santo on 8 March and—after a four-day layover—continued on to Brisbane, Australia, where she became the flagship of the Commander, Aircraft, 7th Fleet, on 21 March. Two days later, she headed north to support General MacArthur's advance up the back of the New Guinea "bird." After stops at Milne Bay and Langemak Bay, she dropped anchor in Seeadler Harbor, Manus, on 31 March. She remained there for three months, tending her Catalinas as they supported the landings at Wakde, Noemfoor, and Biak and generally supported the 7th Fleet's advance. On 31 July, she moved to Woendi Anchorage located just off Biak, at the head of the New Guinea "bird". Tangier conducted seaplane operations from there until 19 September, when she got underway for Morotai. The tender arrived off Morotai on 21 September, and supported the invasion—undergoing intermittent air attacks—until 1 December, when she headed back to Manus. She anchored in Seeadler Harbor again on 5 December.

Tangier visited Woendi again on 22–23 December then sailed for the Philippines. She entered Kossol Roads in the Palaus on Christmas Day and departed again the following day. On 29 December, she arrived in San Pedro Bay, Leyte Gulf, and began operating her seaplanes from there. For almost a month, her charges supported various operations in the Philippines. These included the Lingayen invasion and air strikes on the numerous smaller islands of the archipelago. In fact, their primary mission appears to have been air-sea rescue work in support of the air strikes.

=== 1945 ===
On 24 January 1945, Tangier departed Leyte and headed for Lingayen Gulf, arriving three days later. Her Catalinas and Mariners conducted night barrier patrols of Luzon Strait and the South China Sea along with night searches and anti-shipping flights along the China coast in the vicinity of Formosa. On 12 February, the seaplane tender moved to Mangarin Bay, Mindoro, to run day searches over the South China Sea as far north as the coast of French Indochina and Hainan Island. She concluded operations from Mangarin Bay on 7 March and headed for Subic Bay, Luzon. She arrived there on the following day and departed on ll March. Tangier anchored in Cabalitian Bay, Luzon, off Cabalitian Island, Ilocos, on 12 March and commenced seaplane operations. For the next three months, her planes flew searches and antishipping missions over the South China Sea in the direction of Hong Kong, Swatow, and Formosa.

The seaplane tender exited Cabalitian Bay on 17 June and arrived in Subic Bay the following day. Soon thereafter, she moved to Manila Bay, departing there on 25 June. On 27 June, she stopped at San Pedro Bay; then continued east toward the U.S. She reached Pearl Harbor on 10 July and San Francisco on 20 July. She was overhauled at the Moore Dry Dock Co. and then ordered back to the Far East for occupation duty. On 24 September, she exited San Francisco and headed back across the broad Pacific. Sailing via Adak, Alaska, she reached the vicinity of Yokosuka during the second week in October. After two months of occupation duty in Japan, Tangier moved to Kowloon Bay, China in December for air-sea rescue, patrol, and courier duty. In January 1946, she returned to Japan for another brief tour of duty with the occupation forces. Late in February, she moved from Sasebo to Okinawa, where she remained until late March.

Tangier earned three battle stars during World War II.

=== Post-war and fate ===
On 22 March 1946 Tangier set sail for the U.S. making a brief visit to Pearl Harbor in early April then transiting the Panama Canal in mid-month. She reached Norfolk, Virginia on 29 April and Philadelphia, Pennsylvania on 1 May. Following a short voyage back to Norfolk and to Yorktown, Virginia, the seaplane tender returned to Philadelphia on 11 May 1946 to prepare for in-activation. By January 1947, Tangier was out of commission, berthed with the Reserve Fleet at Philadelphia. On 1 June 1961, her name was struck from the Naval Vessel Register.

On 23 January 1962 the ship was formally transferred from the Navy to the Maritime Administration and immediately sold to Union Minerals and Alloys Corporation for either scrap or conversion. Union Metals undertook conversion into a car carrier/container ship renamed Detroit, with delivery to Sea-Land Service shipping company 23 December 1962. On 17 April 1963 Sea Land to Beauregard, Inc., which operated the ship until purchased by Litton Industries Leasing Corporation on 12 November 1964. Detroit was sold to the Dutch company B. V. Intershitra on 3 October 1974 for scrapping which was completed at Valencia, Spain by Aguilar Y. Peris S. A.

== See also ==
USS Elizabeth C. Stanton (AP-69)
