= USS Half Moon =

Tender of the United States Navy

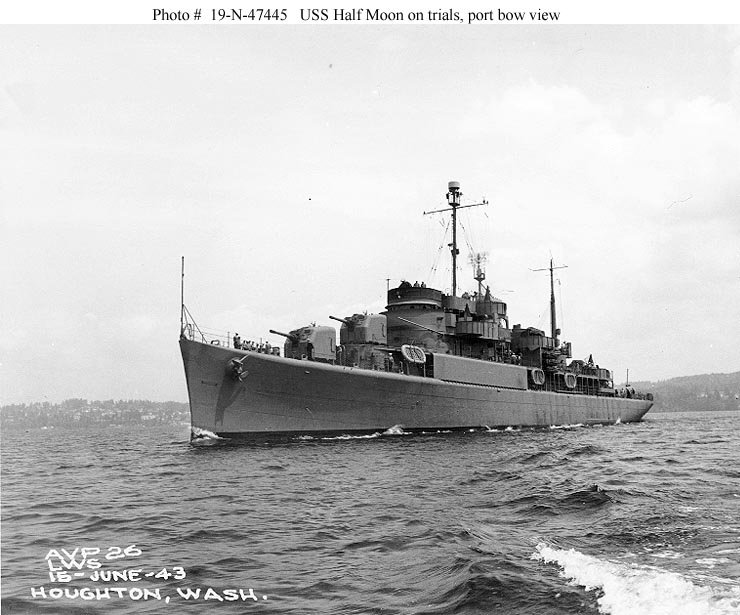
- USS Half Moon (AVP-26) off Houghton, Washington, on her commissioning day, 15 June 1943

History

United States
- Name: USS Half Moon (AVP-26)
- Namesake: Half Moon Bay, on the coast of California south of San Francisco
- Builder: Lake Washington Shipyard, Houghton, Washington
- Laid down: 10 March 1942
- Launched: 12 July 1942
- Sponsored by: Mrs. T. A. Gray
- Reclassified: From seaplane tender, AVP-26, to motor torpedo boat tender, AGP-6, in March 1943, then back to seaplane tender, AVP-26, on 1 May 1943
- Commissioned: 15 June 1943
- Decommissioned: 4 September 1946
- Reclassified: From seaplane tender, AVP-26, to motor torpedo boat tender, AGP-6, in March 1943, then back to seaplane tender, AVP-26, on 1 May 1943
- Honors and awards: Two battle stars for her World War II service
- Fate: Loaned to U.S. Coast Guard 30 July 1948; Permanently transferred to Coast Guard 26 September 1966

United States
- Name: USCGC Half Moon (WAVP-378)
- Namesake: Previous name retained
- Acquired: Loaned by U.S. Navy to Coast Guard 30 July 1948; Transferred permanently from Navy to Coast Guard 26 September 1966
- Commissioned: 14 September 1948
- Reclassified: High endurance cutter, WHEC-378, 1 May 1966
- Decommissioned: 15 July 1969
- Honors and awards: See note (Note: NavSource (at http://www.navsource.net/archives/09/43/4326.htm) credits Half Moon with six campaign stars for her Vietnam War service, but four of the campaigns took place entirely after her departure from Vietnam.)
- Fate: Sold for scrapping 29 April 1970

General characteristics (seaplane tender)
- Class & type: Barnegat-class seaplane tender, converted during construction from a motor torpedo boat tender
- Displacement: 1,766 tons (light); 2,750 tons (full load)
- Length: 310 ft 9 in (94.72 m)
- Beam: 41 ft 2 in (12.55 m)
- Draft: 13 ft 6 in (4.11 m)
- Installed power: 6,000 horsepower (4.48 megawatts)
- Propulsion: Diesel engines, two shafts
- Speed: 18 knots (33 km/h)s
- Complement: 215 (ship's company); 367 (including aviation unit)
- Sensors & processing systems: Radar; sonar
- Armament: 2 × 5 in (130 mm) guns; 4 × quad 20 mm antiaircraft guns; 2 × depth charge tracks
- Aviation facilities: Supplies, spare parts, repairs, and berthing for one seaplane squadron; 80,000 US gallons (300,000 L) aviation fuel

General characteristics (Coast Guard cutter)
- Class & type: Casco-class cutter
- Displacement: 2,498 tons (full load) in 1967
- Length: 310 ft 9.5 in (94.729 m) overall; 300 ft 0 in (91.44 m) between perpendiculars
- Beam: 41 ft 0 in (12.50 m) maximum
- Draft: 12 ft 4 in (3.76 m) full load aft in 1967
- Installed power: 6,400 bhp (4,800 kW)
- Propulsion: Fairbanks-Morse geared diesel engines, (2.677:1), Model 38RD8-1/8 O.P.; two shafts; 171,851 US gallons (650,530 L) of fuel
- Speed: 17.4 knots (32.2 km/h) (maximum sustained in 1967); 11.1 knots (20.6 km/h) (economic in 1967)
- Range: 9,970 nautical miles (18,460 km) at 17.4 knots (32.2 km/h) in 1967; 20,523 nautical miles (38,009 km) at 11.1 knots (20.6 km/h) in 1967
- Complement: 151 (10 officers, 3 warrant officers, 138 enlisted personnel) in 1966
- Sensors & processing systems: Radars in 1967 (one each): AN/SPS-23; AN-SPS-29B; AN-SPA-66; AN-SPA-52; Sonar in 1967: SQS-1
- Armament: In 1967: 1 x single 5-inch (127 mm) 38-caliber Mark 30 Mod 12 gun; Mark 57 Mod 4 director; Mark 34 Mod 11 fire control radar; 2 × 81-mm mortars; 2 × .50-caliber (12.7-millimeter machine guns; 1 × Mark 10-1 antisubmarine projector; 2 × Mark 32 Mod 5 torpedo tubes

USS Half Moon (AVP-26) was a seaplane tender that in commission in the United States Navy from 1943 to 1946 that saw service in the latter half of World War II. After the war, she was in commission in the United States Coast Guard as the cutter USCGC Half Moon (WAVP-378), later WHEC-378, from 1948 to 1969, seeing service in the Vietnam War during her Coast Guard career.

== Construction and commissioning ==
Half Moon was laid down as a small seaplane tender (AVP-26) on 10 March 1942 by Lake Washington Shipyards, Houghton, Washington, and was launched as such on 12 July 1942, sponsored by Mrs. T. A. Gray. In March 1943 she was selected for conversion into a motor torpedo boat tender and redesignated AGP-6, but she was so close to completion as a seaplane tender that it soon was decided to convert the seaplane tender USS Oyster Bay (AVP-28) into a motor torpedo boat tender instead; Oyster Bay was designated AGP-6 and became USS Oyster Bay (AGP-6). Half Moon, meanwhile, was again classified as a seaplane tender, again designated AVP-26 on 1 May 1943, and commissioned as such on 15 June 1943.

== United States Navy service ==
=== World War II ===
Half Moon spent her first months in shakedown training off California, and was then assigned to the United States Pacific Fleet. Departing San Diego, California, on 25 August 1943, she embarked a United States Marine Corps air group at Pearl Harbor, Hawaii, and steamed into Vila Harbor, New Hebrides, on 14 September 1943. She then sailed to Brisbane, Australia.

==== The New Guinea campaign ====
From Brisbane, Half Moon moved to Namoai Bay, on Sariba Island, New Guinea, arriving on 6 October 1943. At Namoai Bay Half Moon began her tending duties. Her embarked squadron, flying PBY Catalina flying boats, conducted night antishipping strikes in the New Guinea area. With the support of seaplane tenders like Half Moon these missions, called '"Black Cat" strikes, achieved important results in the destruction of Japanese transports.

Half Moon departed for Brisbane on 21 December 1943, remained there until 10 February 1944, and then steamed into a succession of New Guinea ports on the way to her new operating base, Finschafen, New Guinea. There she resumed her support of seaplane operations in the New Guinea theater.

After tending seaplanes on air-sea rescue missions from Humboldt Bay, New Guinea, in May 1944, Half Moon spent several months substituting for transports in the Pacific area, stopping at Brisbane, Manus Island, Milne Bay, and other ports. She took up "Black Cat" operations again on 25 August 1944 from Middelburg and later Morotai.

==== The Philippines campaign ====
Steaming out of Morotai on 6 October 1944, Half Moon joined a small convoy en route to Leyte Gulf to assist in the developing operations for the recapture of the Philippine Islands. The convoy arrived at Leyte Gulf on 21 October 1944, and Half Moon immediately steamed down the eastern coast of Leyte in search of a proper anchorage for her seaplane operations.

Anchoring in Hinunangan Bay, Half Moon came under air attack on 23 October 1944, and soon realized that her anchorage was a rendezvous point for Japanese planes attacking Leyte. Late on 24 October 1944 the radar aboard Half Moon began to pick up two large surface units converging and it was soon clear that she was to be a witness to the last engagement between battlelines of surface ships, the Battle of Surigao Strait, one of several actions making up the larger Battle of Leyte Gulf of 23 October 1944 – 26 October 1944. Half Moon cautiously slipped out from behind Oabugan Grande Island and was given permission to proceed up the coast of Leyte between, but well to the west of, the two fleets. She watched the spectacle of Rear Admiral Jesse B. Oldendorf's battleships, cruisers, and destroyers pounding the Japanese ships, and after the battle returned to Hinamangan Bay. Another fierce air attack, however, soon convinced the commanding officer of Half Moon that San Pedro Bay, further north, offered a more hospitable base for operation.

Half Moon weathered two severe storms, on 29 October 1944 and 8 November 1944, and operated with her seaplanes in Leyte Gulf until 27 December 1944. She was then designated as part of the support convoy for the Mindoro landing, and departed for Mangarin Bay on 27 December 1944. The convoy, known as "Uncle plus 15", encountered some of the most prolonged and determined air attacks of World War II as the Japanese strove mightily to prevent American reinforcements from reaching Mindoro. Air cover provided by land-based aircraft stopped only some of the Japanese attackers. Suicide planes (kamikazes), bombs, and strafing hit many ships. The Liberty Ship SS John Burke, loaded with ammunition, exploded, leaving virtually no trace after a kamikaze hit, the tanker USS Porcupine (IX-126) and the motor torpedo boat tender USS Orestes (AGP-10) were severely damaged, and other ships also suffered hits.

Nevertheless, the convoy drove through, giving the Japanese planes a hot time with concentrated antiaircraft fire. During the convoy's three-day voyage, gunners on Half Moon and the other ships were at their stations around the clock, Half Moon accounting for at least two and possibly four of the attacking aircraft.

The convoy arrived at Mindoro on 30 December 1944. Air attacks continued. On 4 January 1945 during one of these a large bomb skipped over Half Moon's fantail, falling to explode. Half Moon remained in Mangarin Bay tending seaplanes until returning to Leyte Gulf on 17 February 1945.

Following the victorious Philippine invasion, Half Moon moved to Manus and Humboldt Bay. While in dry dock at Manus a sole Japanese aircraft launched a torpedo at Half Moon, striking the dry dock and destroying its mess hall. There was no damage to Half Moon and only one injury, a crew member who fell off the top of the dock while fishing. The following day Tokyo Rose reported that Half Moon had been sunk.

On 30 May 1945, Half Moon got underway for the Philippines again, arriving at Tawi Tawi in the Sulu Archipelago on 11 June 1945. She supported seaplane antisubmarine searches from Tawi Tawi Bay until early August 1945, and then carried out the same mission from Mangarin Bay on Mindoro.

==== Honors and awards ====
Half Moon received two battle stars for her World War II service.

=== Post-World War II ===
Following Japan's surrender on 15 August 1945, Half Moon proceeded to Subic Bay on Luzon in the Philippines, and from there got underway for Okinawa on 30 August 1945. On the afternoon of 31 August 1945 signs of a storm were evident and by 1 September 1945 Half Moon was engulfed in a raging typhoon, with winds up to 120 knots (220 km/h) (222 kilometers per hour) and barometer readings of 27.32 inches (925 millibars). Smart seamanship allowed her to weather the storm, and she arrived safely at Okinawa on 4 September 1945.

Half Moon departed Okinawa for Manila on 1 October 1945, operated in that area for about a month, and departed Manila on 7 November 1945 for deactivation. She arrived at Seattle, Washington, on 1 December 1945, steamed to San Diego on 12 April 1946, decommissioned there on 4 September 1946, and was placed in reserve.

== United States Coast Guard service ==
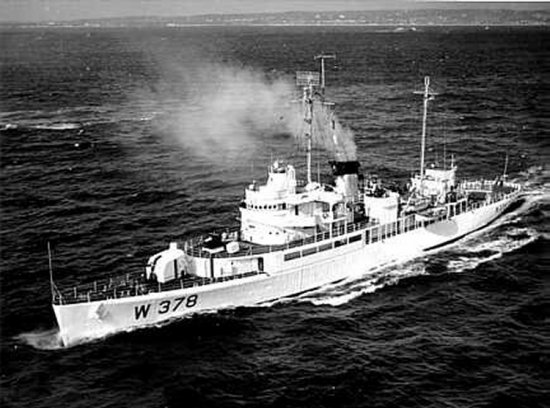
USCGC Half Moon (WAVP-378), later WHEC-378, sometime between 1948 and the Coast Guard's 1967 adoption of the "racing stripe" markings on its ships.

Barnegat-class ships were very reliable and seaworthy and had good habitability, and the Coast Guard viewed them as ideal for ocean station duty, in which they would perform weather reporting and search and rescue tasks, once they were modified by having a balloon shelter added aft and having oceanographic equipment, an oceanographic winch, and a hydrographic winch installed. After World War II, the U.S. Navy transferred 18 of the ships to the Coast Guard, in which they were known as the Casco-class cutters.

The U.S. Navy loaned Half Moon to the United States Coast Guard on 30 July 1948. After undergoing conversion for Coast Guard use, she was commissioned into the Coast Guard on 14 September 1948 as USCGC Half Moon (WAVP-378).

=== Atlantic operations 1948-1967 ===
Half Moon was stationed at Staten Island and Governors Island in New York City throughout her Coast Guard career. Her primary duty was to serve on ocean stations in the Atlantic Ocean to gather meteorological data. While on duty in one of these stations, she was required to patrol a 210-square-mile (544-square-kilometer) area for three weeks at a time, leaving the area only when physically relieved by another Coast Guard cutter or in the case of a dire emergency. While on station, she acted as an aircraft check point at the point of no return, a relay point for messages from ships and aircraft, as a source of the latest weather information for passing aircraft, as a floating oceanographic laboratory, and as a search-and-rescue ship for downed aircraft and vessels in distress, and she engaged in law enforcement operations.

On 24 and 25 August 1951, Half Moon assisted the merchant ship Castello Guadalest in the North Atlantic at 39°30′00″N 058°32′00″W.

While in Bermuda on a United States Coast Guard Reserve training cruise, Half Moon helped civil authorities in fight a fire aboard the merchant ship Coastal Service at Ordnance Wharf in St. George's, on 14 August 1963.

Half Moon was reclassified as a high endurance cutter and redesignated WHEC-378 on 1 May 1966. Her loan period from the U.S. Navy came to an end on 26 September 1966, when she was transferred permanently from the Navy to the Coast Guard.

On 11 January 1967, Half Moon seized four American fishing vessels seven nautical miles (13 kilometers) northwest of Dog Rocks following a shooting incident in which one person was killed and another wounded.

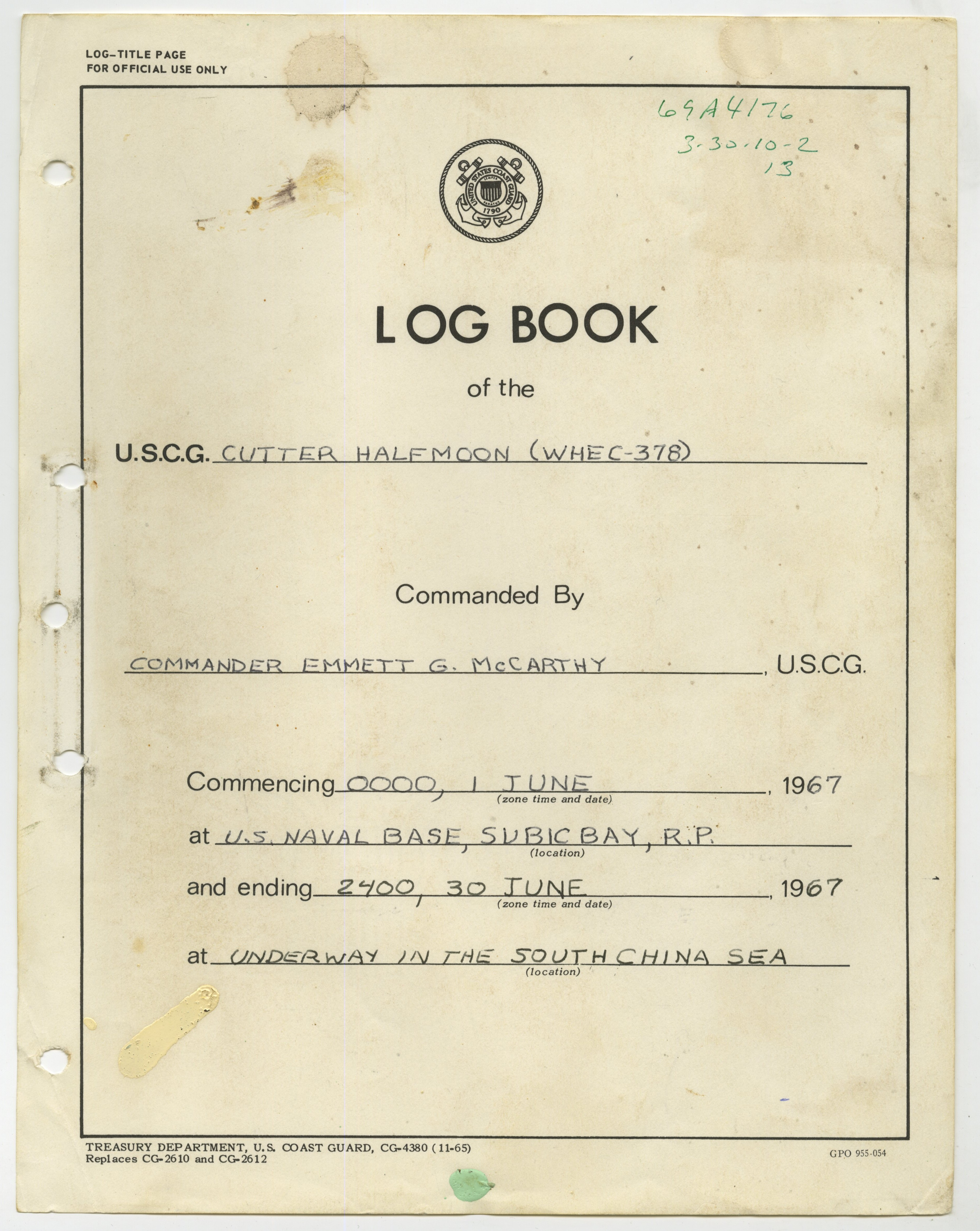
The cover of the USCGC Half Moon logbook for June 1967

=== Vietnam War service 1967 ===
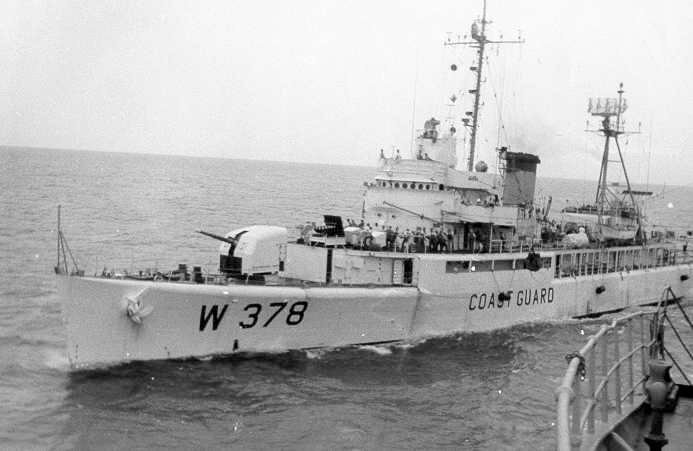
USCGC Half Moon (WHEC-378) conducting underway replenishment operations during her Vietnam War service in 1967.

Half Moon sailed from New York Harbor on 1 April 1967 under the command of Commander Emmett G. McCarthy, bound for Pearl Harbor, Hawaii, and an assignment to Coast Guard Squadron Three. The squadron, which was designated Task Unit 70.8.6, was activated at Pearl Harbor, Hawaii, on 24 April 1967 when its commander, Captain John E. Day, hoisted his flag aboard his flagship, the Coast Guard cutter USCGC Gresham.

Coast Guard Squadron Three was tasked to operate in the South China Sea in conjunction with U.S. Navy forces in Operation Market Time, the interdiction of North Vietnamese arms and munitions traffic along the coastline of South Vietnam during the Vietnam War. The squadron's other Vietnam War duties included fire support for ground forces, resupplying Coast Guard and Navy patrol boats, and search-and-rescue operations. Serving in the squadron with Gresham and Half Moon were the cutters USCGC Yakutat, USCGC Barataria and USCGC Bering Strait; like Half Moon and Gresham, they all were former Navy Barnegat-class ships. They departed Pearl Harbor on 26 April 1967 and reported to Commander, United States Seventh Fleet, for Market Time duty on 4 May 1967. They were joined by Navy radar picket destroyer escorts (DERs) of Escort Squadrons 5 and 7.

The ten Market Time ships arrived at Subic Bay in the Philippines on 10 May 1967. The five Coast Guard cutters and five Navy destroyer escorts continuously manned four Market Time stations off Vietnam, while only Navy warships served on two Taiwan patrol stations. One ship rotated duty as the station ship in Hong Kong.

During her tour, Half Moon conducted nine naval gunfire missions along the coast of South Vietnam in support of forces ashore. On 12 September 1967 she was ordered to fire on a Viet Cong (VC) build-up in An Xugen Province; her gunfire killed at least one VC soldier and destroyed three fortifications on that occasion. During her tour, she was credited with killing at least 13 VC soldiers, destroying 64 military emplacements and structures, and sinking four sampans. Half Moon also served as a home base for 50-foot (15.25 m) U.S. Navy Patrol Craft Fast and participated in search and rescue operations.

Half Moon concluded her Vietnam War tour on 29 December 1967.

==== Honors and awards ====
See note.

=== Atlantic operations 1968-1969 ===
Half Moon returned from Vietnam to her home port at New York City on 22 January 1968 and resumed her routine Coast Guard operations in the Atlantic. On 11 July 1968 she helped to evacuate an injured crewman from the West German merchant ship Brunsdeich.

=== Decommissioning and disposal ===
The Coast Guard decommissioned Half Moon on 15 July 1969. She was sold for scrapping on 29 April 1970 to Cantieri Navali, Genoa, Italy, for a bid price of $66,000 (USD).
