= Mios Woendi =

Island in Papua, Indonesia

Coordinates: 1°15′10″S 136°22′28″E

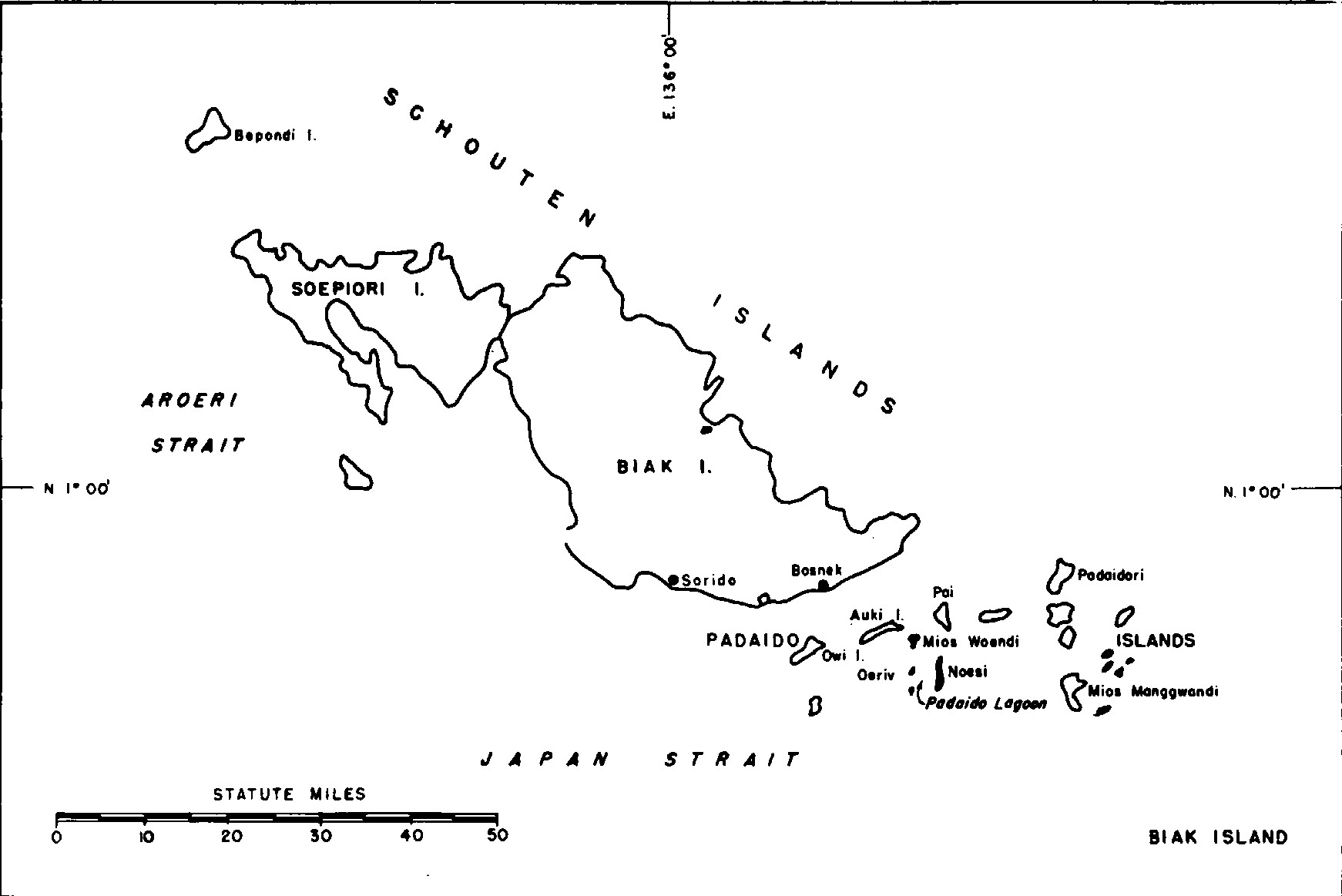
The island is an atoll southeast of Biak

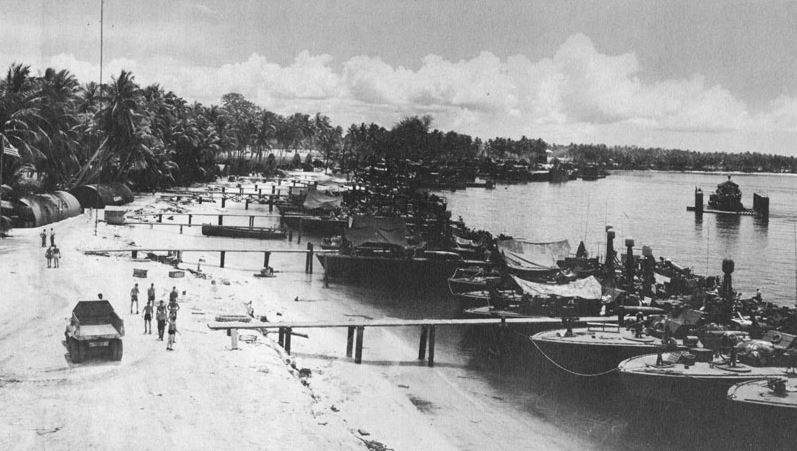
Mios Woendi NARA 80-G-258662 Finger piers with PTs and Seabee pontoon drydock in background

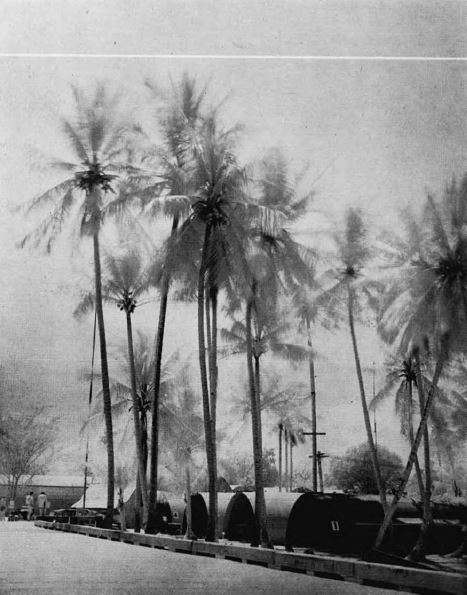
Mios Woendi Base Administration Quonsets

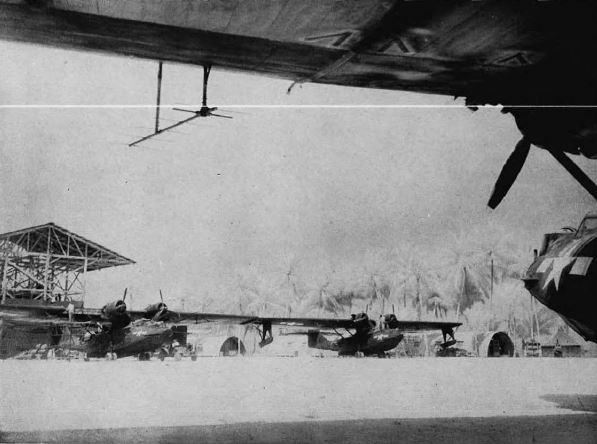
Mios Woendi PBY Black Cats

Mios Woendi island is an island in the Schouten Islands of Papua province, eastern Indonesia. It lies in Cenderawasih Bay (or Geelvink Bay) 50 kilometres (31 mi; 27 nmi) off the northwestern coast of the island nation of Papua New Guinea.

== Description ==
The island is in an atoll southeast of Biak, off the north coast of Papua in Western New Guinea. It is roughly a triangle in shape with the longest side 1 mile (1.6 km) in length. Padaido lagoon at Mios Woendi, provides a deep-water anchorage of nearly 5 square miles (13 km^{2}), and the island has 2,100 feet (640 m) of navigable beach front. The climate is tropical, with an annual rainfall close to 100 inches (2,540 mm). The people are primarily Melanesian.

== History ==
=== World War II ===
Mios Woedni was the location of a forward base,Naval Base Mios Woendi , of the United States Navy during World War II code named "Stinker".

In June 1944 PT Advance Base 2 arrived along with the Seabees of PT Advance Base Construction Detachment of the 113th Naval Construction Battalion. When all was done Mios Woendi would be the largest PT facility in the Pacific and named Camp Taylor for the skipper PT-193 lost. To make that happen the 55th CB was sent to enlarge the camp into a 2,000 man base that would be PT Base 21. There were 12 finger docks to accommodate 50 PT boats. The 19th Special Construction Battalion was sent to take care of the stevedoring and had brought a 100-bed mobile dispensary to set up in addition. The dispensary would be absorbed into the 300 bed Naval Hospital 16 built by the 55th CB. The Seabees had to add more when Navy Seaplane Base 2 arrived in July. VPB-11, VPB-20, VPB-33 and VPB-34 all had aircraft there at one point. Also arriving in July was Mobile Amphibious Repair Base 2. This advance base component was designed to provide repairs and support for the operation of 18 LST's, 18 LCI's, 36 LCT's, 60 LCM's, and 240 LCVP's. Five PT drydocks plus repair shops and a torpedo depot were also constructed. The last combat patrol out of Mios Woendi was mid-November 1944. Ships stationed at or transitioning the base to support PT operations were the USS Hilo (AGP-2), USS Portunus (AGP-4), USS Varuna (AGP-5), USS Oyster Bay (AGP-6), USS Mobjack (AGP-7), USS Willoughby (AGP-9), USS Orestes (AGP-10) and USS Griffin (AS-13). The Hilo was the Flagship of PT Task Group 70.1 and the Griffen was tasked for submarines. On short notice the Seabees built a stage for a USO show featuring Bob Hope, Frances Langford and Patty Thomas.

Camp Taylor also served submarines. Its torpedo depot was one reason. The other was special operations of the Combined Field Intelligence Service in support of guerrillas and coast watchers. These guerrilla sub missions originated at Brisbane's, Capricorn Wharf or Mios Woendi. The USS Narwhal (SS-167) one of these boats. She would have a refit at Mios Woendi and be based there for a period.

When the war ended the Dutch Navy used the facilities until 1961.

PT Squadrons at Camp Taylor at various times:

- MTB Ron 9
- MTB Ron 10
- MTB Ron 12
- MTB Ron 13
- MTB Ron 16
- MTB Ron 18
- MTB Ron 21
- MTB Ron 25
- MTB Ron 33
- MTB Ron 36
