= Mangarin Bay =

- Location within the Philippines Mangarin Bay (Palawan) Mangarin Bay (Philippines)
- Location: Mindoro Island, Philippines
- Coordinates: 12°19′17.76″N 121°2′56.4″E
- Type: Bay
- Part of: South China Sea
- Settlements: Magsaysay; San Jose

Mangarin Bay is a bay of the South China Sea, on the west coast of Mindoro island, in Occidental Mindoro Province of the Philippines.

The bay is shoal, and sheltered from the wind by Mangarin Point to the east and by Ilin Island.

Magarin Point terminates in a long sandy pit off which the depth is 4 to 5 fathoms. Farther in the water shoals rapidly.

The settlement of Mangarin is only accessible by light boat. The surroundings are marshy, and few supplies are available.
