= San Pedro Bay (Philippines) =

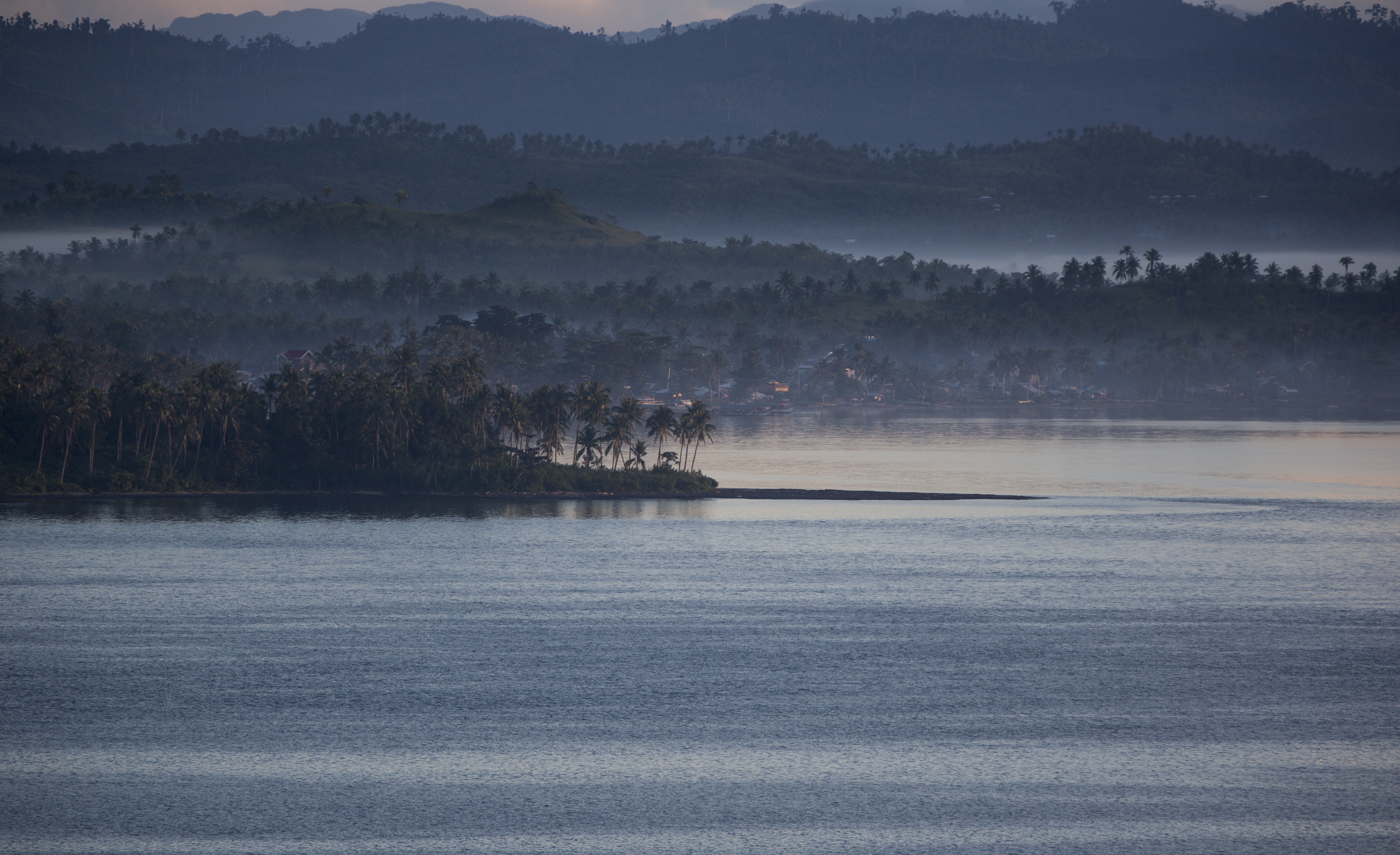
- The Cancabato Bay, an extension of San Pedro Bay in Tacloban

- Location within the Philippines San Pedro Bay (Philippines)
- Location: Eastern Visayas, Philippines
- Coordinates: 11°10′36.84″N 125°6′28.08″E
- Type: bay
- Part of: Leyte Gulf
- Settlements: Basey; Marabut; Palo; Tacloban; Tanauan; Tolosa

San Pedro Bay is a bay in the Philippines, at the northwest end of Leyte Gulf. It measures about 15 kilometres (9.3 mi; 8.1 nmi) east to west and 20 kilometres (12 mi; 11 nmi) north to south. The bay is bounded by two islands, by Samar the north and east and by Leyte on the east. It is connected by San Juanico Strait to Carigara Bay, an arm of the Samar Sea. The largest city on the bay is Tacloban City, the capital of the province of Leyte in the administrative region of Eastern Visayas.

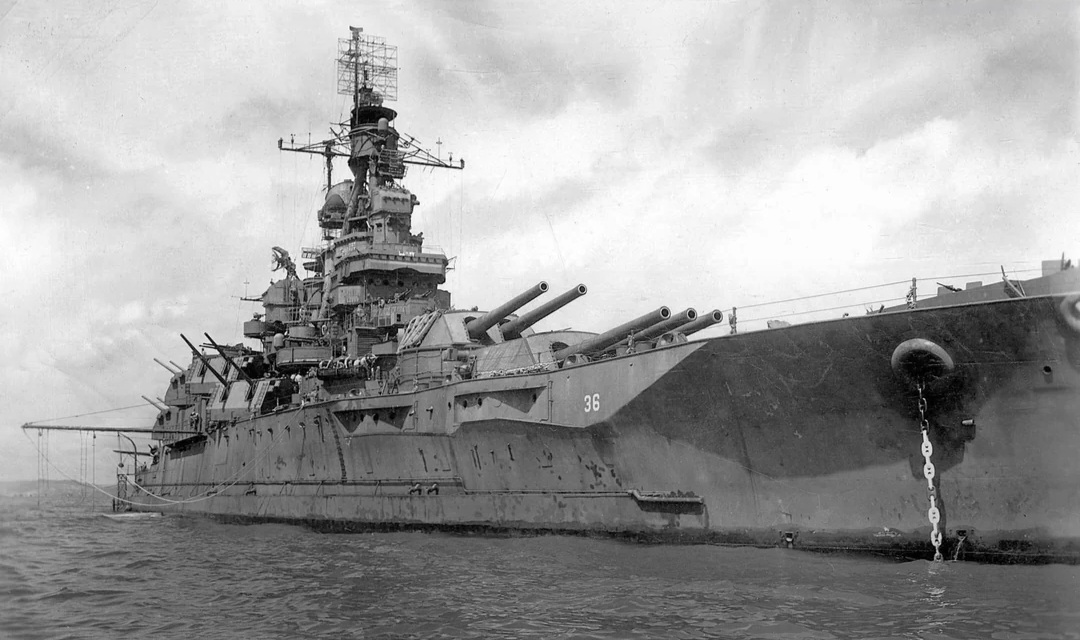
Battleship USS Nevada in San Pedro Bay, Philippines, 1945

During World War II, the bay was part of a large United States Navy base, the Leyte-Samar Naval Base.
