= Cape Eluanbi =

Headland in Taiwan

Cape Eluanbi Eluan Cape, Cape Oluanpi
- Cape
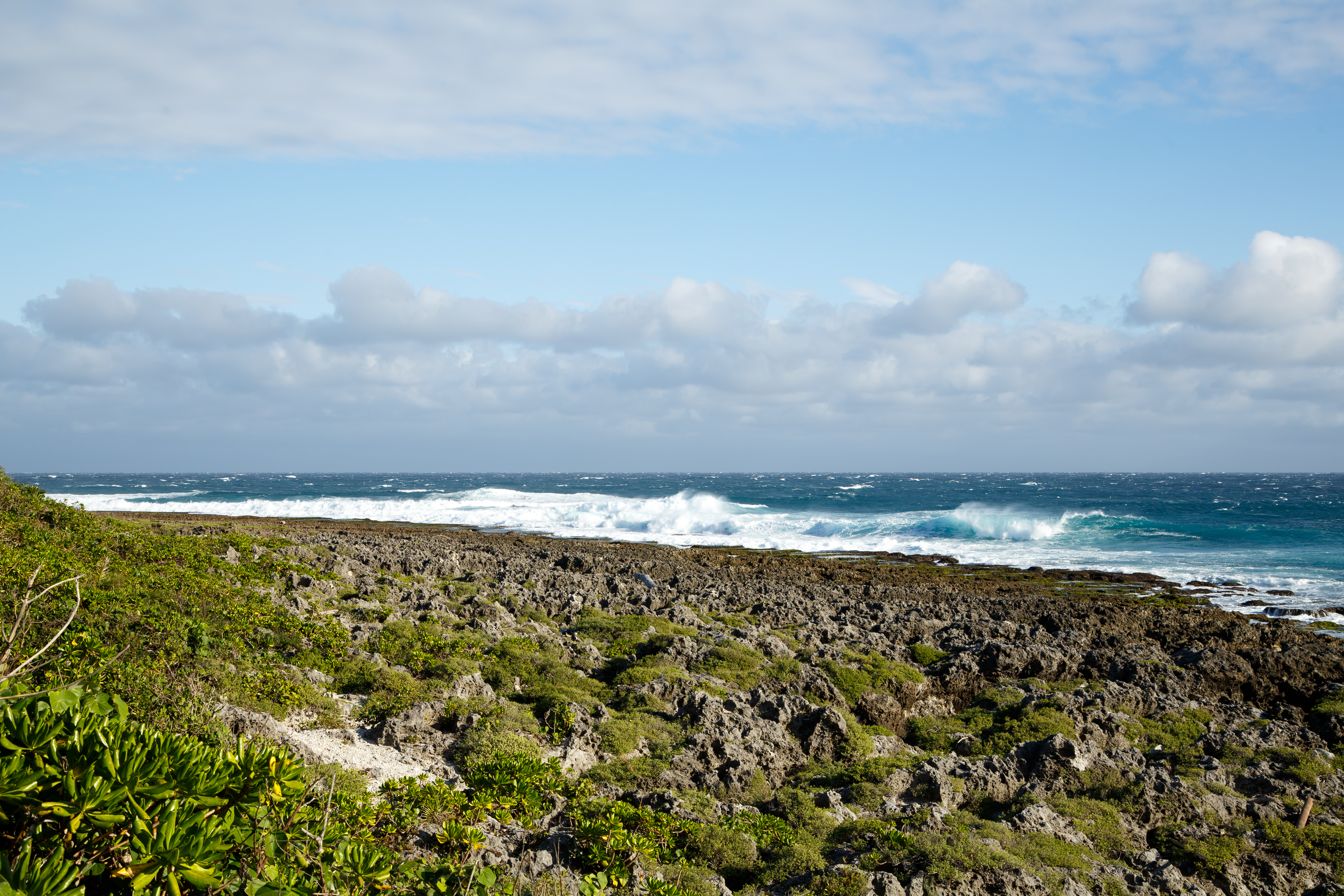
- Cape Eluanbi

- Location within Taiwan
- Coordinates: 21°54′08″N 120°51′10″E
- Location: Hengchun, Pingtung County, Taiwan
- Designation: National park

Cape Eluanbi

Chinese name
- Traditional Chinese: 鵝鑾鼻
- Simplified Chinese: 鹅銮鼻
- Literal meaning: transcription of Paiwan goran, meaning "sail"
Transcriptions
Standard Mandarin
- Hanyu Pinyin: Éluánbí
- Wade–Giles: O-luan-pi
- Tongyong Pinyin: Éluánbí
Southern Min
- Hokkien POJ: Gô-lôan-phīⁿ

Japanese name
- Kanji: 鵝鑾鼻
- Hiragana: がらんび
Transcriptions
- Romanization: Garanbi

Cape Eluanbi or Oluanpi, also known by other names, is the southernmost point on the island of Taiwan. It is located in Eluanbi Park within the Hengchun Township in Pingtung County.

== Names ==
Éluánbí is the pinyin romanization of the Mandarin pronunciation of its Chinese name 鵝鑾鼻. These characters literally mean "Goose Bell Nose", but actually transcribe the local Hokkien pronunciation Gô-lôan, used as a transliteration of the Paiwan goran ("sail"). This may be a reference to nearby Sail Rock. The "nose" in the name is a dialectical term for a cape, as in nearby Cape Maobitou.

Under the Qing, it was sometimes known as "Linhaishan". Under Japanese rule, the cape was known as Garan Bi or Garanbi from the Japanese pronunciation of characters in Eluanbi. It is also sometimes known as Eluan Pi or Oluanpi; as Gaw-loan-phi, Ngoluanpi, or Goa-loan-pi from its Hokkien pronunciation; or as South Cape from its position.

== Geography ==
Taiwan's Southernmost Point
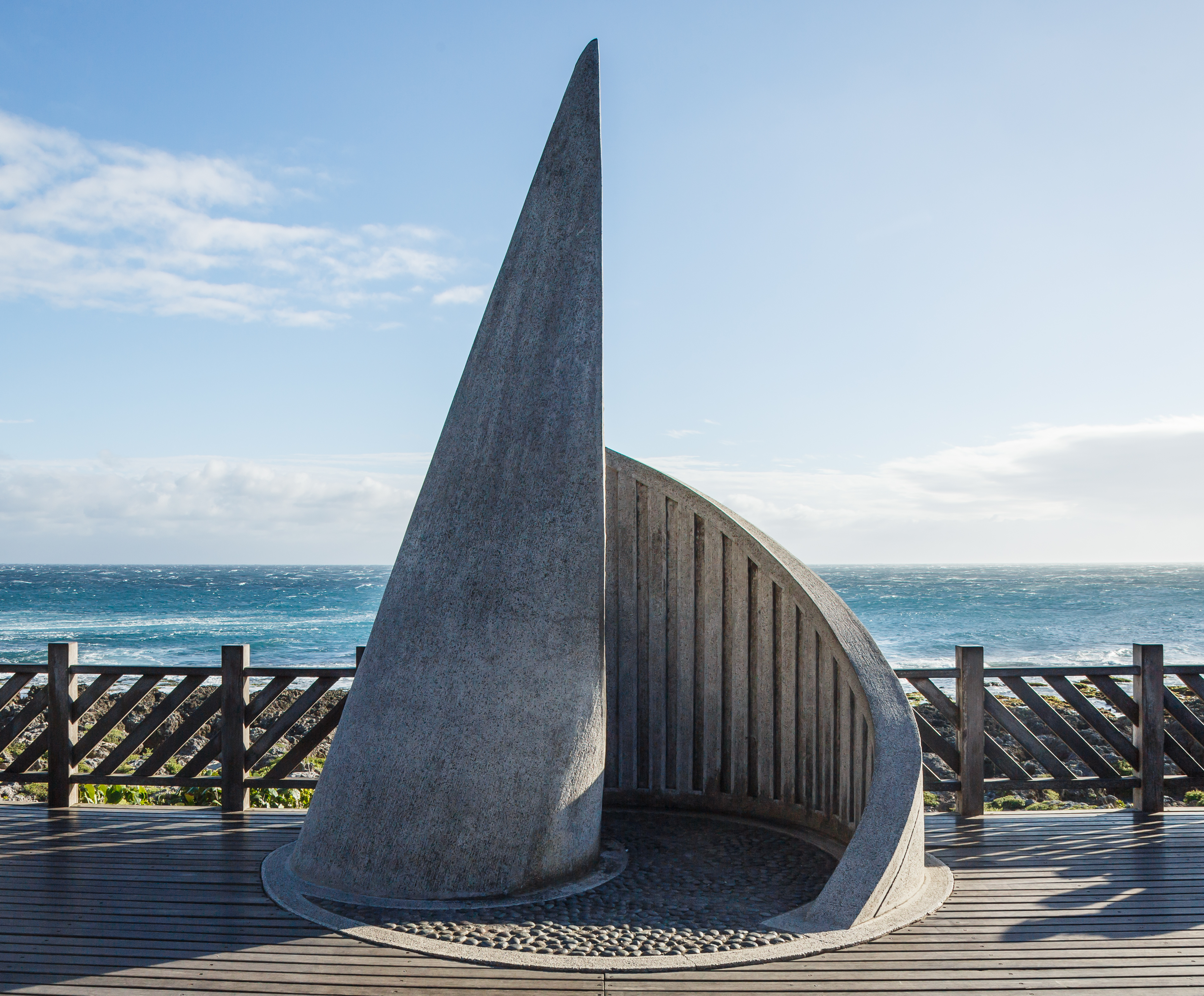
- The marker at Taiwan's southernmost point
- Traditional Chinese: 臺灣最南點
- Simplified Chinese: 台湾最南点
Transcriptions
Standard Mandarin
- Hanyu Pinyin: Táiwān Zuì Nán Diǎn
- Wade–Giles: T’ai-wan Tsui Nan Tien

Eluanbi is the southernmost point of the Hengchun Peninsula, making it the southernmost point on Formosa or Taiwan Island. The area's geologic formation is known as the Eluanbi Beds (層, céng), a Pleistocene stratum of yellow and brown sand, gravel, and clay. The nearby highlands are considered an extension of Taiwan's Central Mountain Range.

Current international agreement places the boundary between the East and South China Seas at Cape Fugui, Taiwan's northernmost point, but Eluanbi—still under its Japanese name "Garan Bi"—forms part of the boundary between the East China and Philippine Seas. The still-unapproved draft for a new edition of the IHO's Limits of Oceans and Seas makes "Eluan Cape" part of the northern boundary of the South China Sea the southern boundary of the Taiwan Strait, and part of the western border of the Philippine Sea.

Informally, Eluanbi may also be considered part of the Luzon Strait and Bashi Channel between the territory of Taiwan and the Philippines.

== History ==
=== Prehistory ===
Archaeologists have found evidence of prehistoric habitation at Eluanbi dating to around 3100 BC. The remains are similar to those of the Xiantao culture found on the islands of Taitung County but known locally as "Oluanpi-I". Pottery and weaving began to appear under the "Kenting" around 2500 BC. Around 1500 BC, the "Oluanpi-III" curtailed lowland farming and retreated to more defensive communities in the highlands; it developed into the "Oluanpi-IV" around 50 BC. About the same time, the separate Hsiang-lin culture settled in the area's river valleys and lowlands; the Kueishan culture followed them around the 2nd century and the Ami around the 5th. By that point, hunting had become a ritual act and pastime for its well-developed farming communities, rather than a means of survival. The Paiwan eventually replaced the local people in the highlands, expanding from the north. The Siraya, from a legendary origin on Xiaoliuqiu, settled into the area's lowlands from the 8th century and were the first to greatly sinify themselves.

=== Qing Empire ===
Under the early Qing, the area around the cape continued to be held by Taiwanese aborigines such as the Paiwan. The cape's strong currents and nearby Qixingyan reefs produced numerous shipwrecks, provoking international incidents in the case of the Rover in 1867 and a Ryukyu convoy in 1871 that led to American and Japanese invasions of the island.

The American consul at Xiamen (then known as "Amoy") Charles Le Gendre advised the Viceroy of Liangjiang Shen Baozhen of the risk to Chinese control of Taiwan posed by its official disavowal of control over native-held lands on the island. Shen reformed the civil and military administrations on Taiwan, launched assaults against restive tribes, and began a public works program on the southern coast including a lighthouse at Eluanbi. Construction of the lighthouse fell under the purview of the British diplomat Robert Hart, who served as inspector general of the Imperial Maritime Customs Service. He sent agents to purchase the southern cape from the leaders of the Kuie Chia Chiao (龜仔角; Guīzǎijiǎo) in 1875. This gesture did not keep the Paiwan and other tribes from raids and assaults against the Chinese construction projects, which necessitated garrisoning and fortifying Eluanbi. The lighthouse itself was finally raised between 1881 and 1883, entering service on 1 April 1883.

The lighthouse, its staff, and its garrison were initially overseen by British customs officers and German military officers. The site was protected by 18-pound cannons, Gatling guns, and a mortar. Provisions were kept for three weeks in the event of a siege.

=== Imperial Japan ===
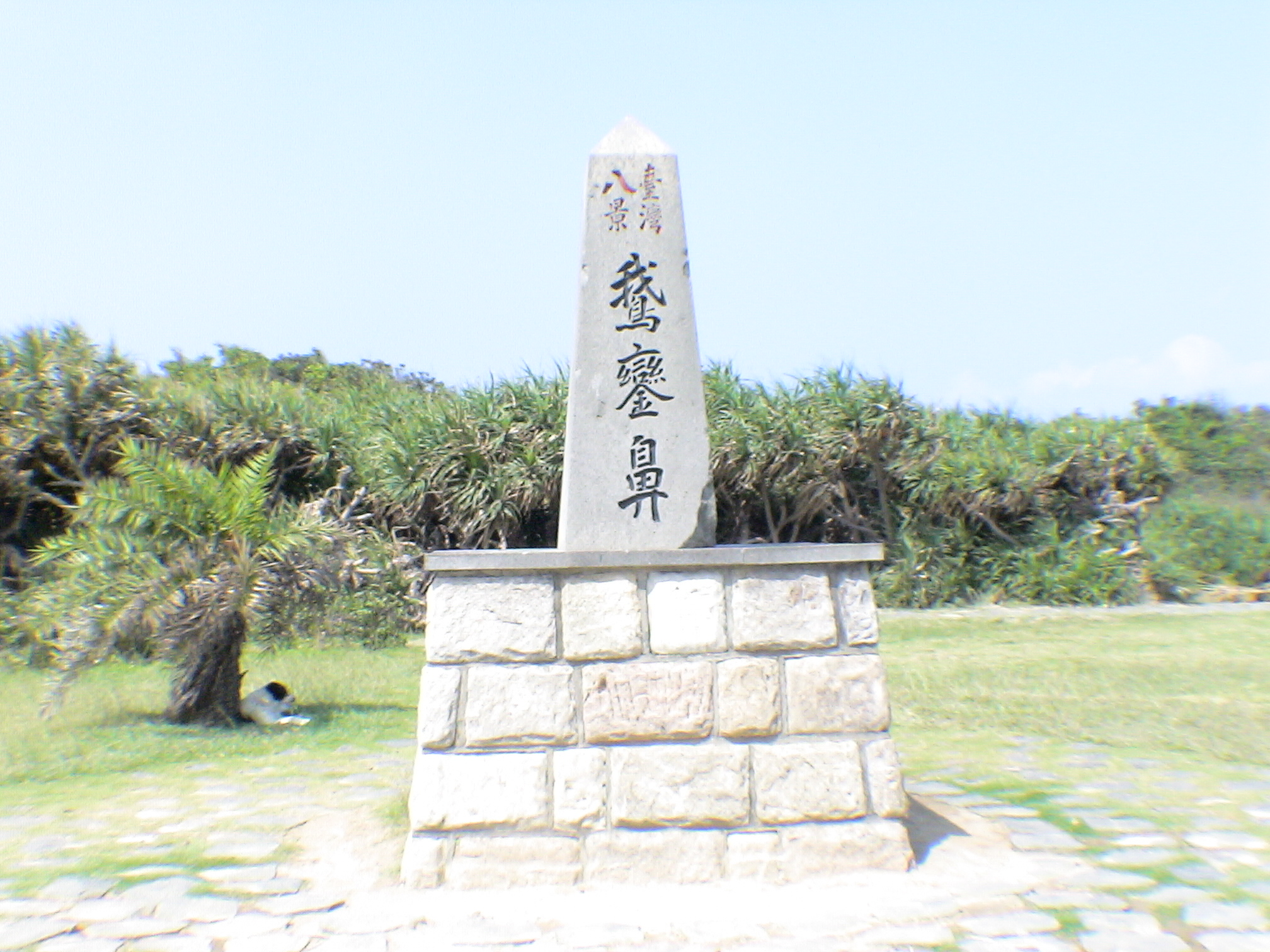
Stone monument commemorating Eluanbi as one of the Eight Views of Taiwan

The Qing structure was heavily damaged during the First Sino-Japanese War, with the retreating Qing attempting to demolish it themselves. It was repaired in 1898 following the Japanese occupation of the island. It was under Japanese occupation that the cape was recognized as the southernmost point on the island, and the lighthouse was popularized by the Japanese as one of the Eight Views of Taiwan.

Garanbi Shrine
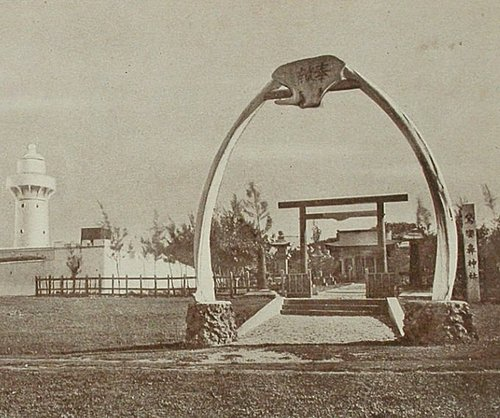
- The Shinto shrine at Eluanbi

Japanese name
- Kanji: 鵝鑾鼻神社
- Hiragana: ガランピじんじゃ
Transcriptions
- Romanization: Garanbi Jinja

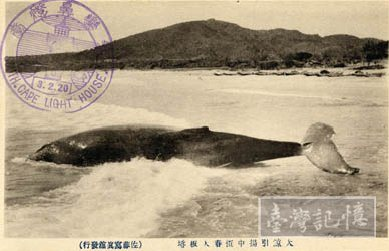
Japanese whaling near Eluanbi in the 1920s

The cape was a major station for the Japanese whaling industry, targeting humpback whales in Banana and South Bays. The site's importance to the whaling industry was underscored by the design of its Shinto shrine, one of only five in the world to use baleen whales' jawbones to form their torii gates.

The fortified lighthouse was seriously damaged again during World War II by Allied bombing; the shrine was destroyed at the same time.

=== Republic of China ===
Cape Eluan Park
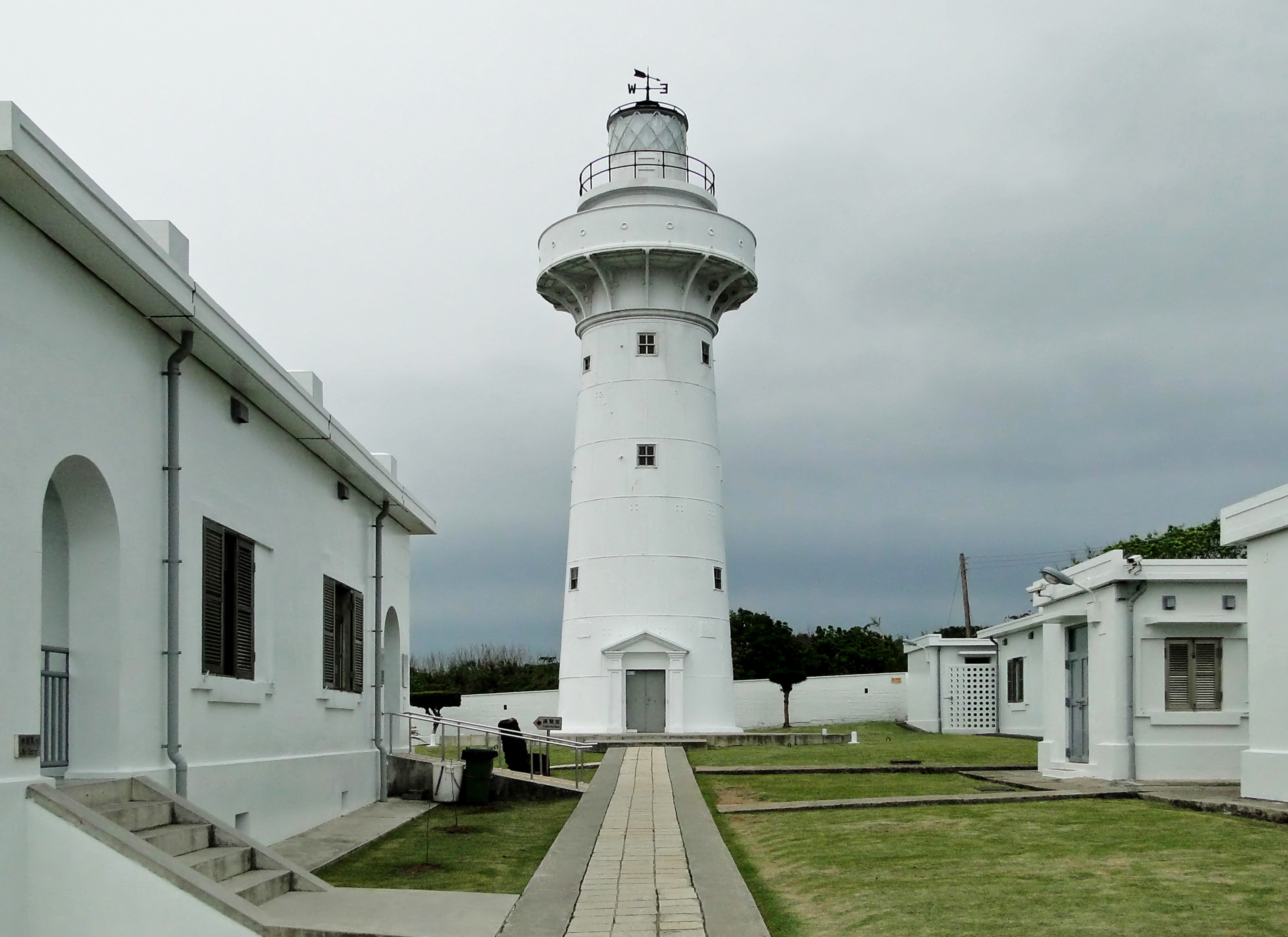
- Eluanbi Lighthouse
- Traditional Chinese: 鵝鑾鼻公園
- Simplified Chinese: 鹅銮鼻公园
Transcriptions
Standard Mandarin
- Hanyu Pinyin: Éluánbí Gōngyuán
- Wade–Giles: O-luan-pi Kung-yüan

The Nationalist government rebuilt the lighthouse in 1947. The accidental exposure of several stone coffins near the lighthouse in 1956 prompted investigation of the area by the archaeologists Sung Wen-tung and Lin Chao-chi that year and again in 1966. The lighthouse grounds were turned into a national park in 1982. During the construction of paths and walkways prior to its opening, further prehistoric relics were found in 1981 and excavated over the next two years by teams under Li Kuang-chou.

In 1992 Eluanbi Lighthouse was among the first lighthouses on Taiwan to be opened to the general public, and its popularity motivated the Maritime and Port Bureau to open others elsewhere. By 2014, it was receiving more than 300,000 visitors a year, many of them tourists from Mainland China.

== Park ==
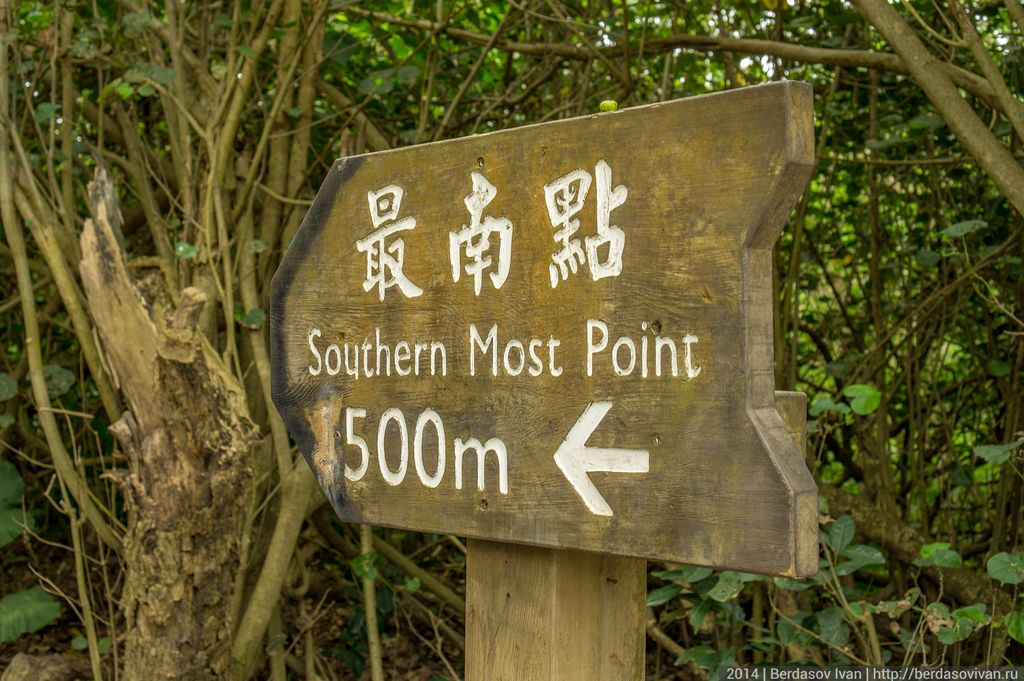
A park sign guiding visitors to the marker

The cape is located within the 59 ha (150-acre) Eluanbi Park, part of the larger Kenting National Park that covers the southern end of the Hengchun Peninsula.

A viewing platform with a rock marker at the island's southernmost point has become a tourist attraction.

Fishing and marine sports are popular in the area, but it also includes some nature reserves such as the Longkeng Ecological Protection Area (龍坑生態保護區). Located around Banana Bay, Longkeng preserves coral reefs and an old-growth forest. The seas around Eluanbi are no longer home to any native whales, but it remains abundantly stocked with smaller cetaceans such as dolphins, with sea turtles, and bull sharks. In particular, the 26 species of terrestrial crabs that inhabit the cape make it the most biologically diverse location for land crabs in the world.

== See also ==
- Geography of Taiwan
- Cape Fugui, the northernmost point on Taiwan
- Geographic Center of Taiwan
- List of countries by southernmost point
- List of Taiwanese superlatives
