= Eluanbi Lighthouse =

Lighthouse in Hengchun, Pintung County, Taiwan

Eluanbi Lighthouse 鵝鑾鼻燈塔
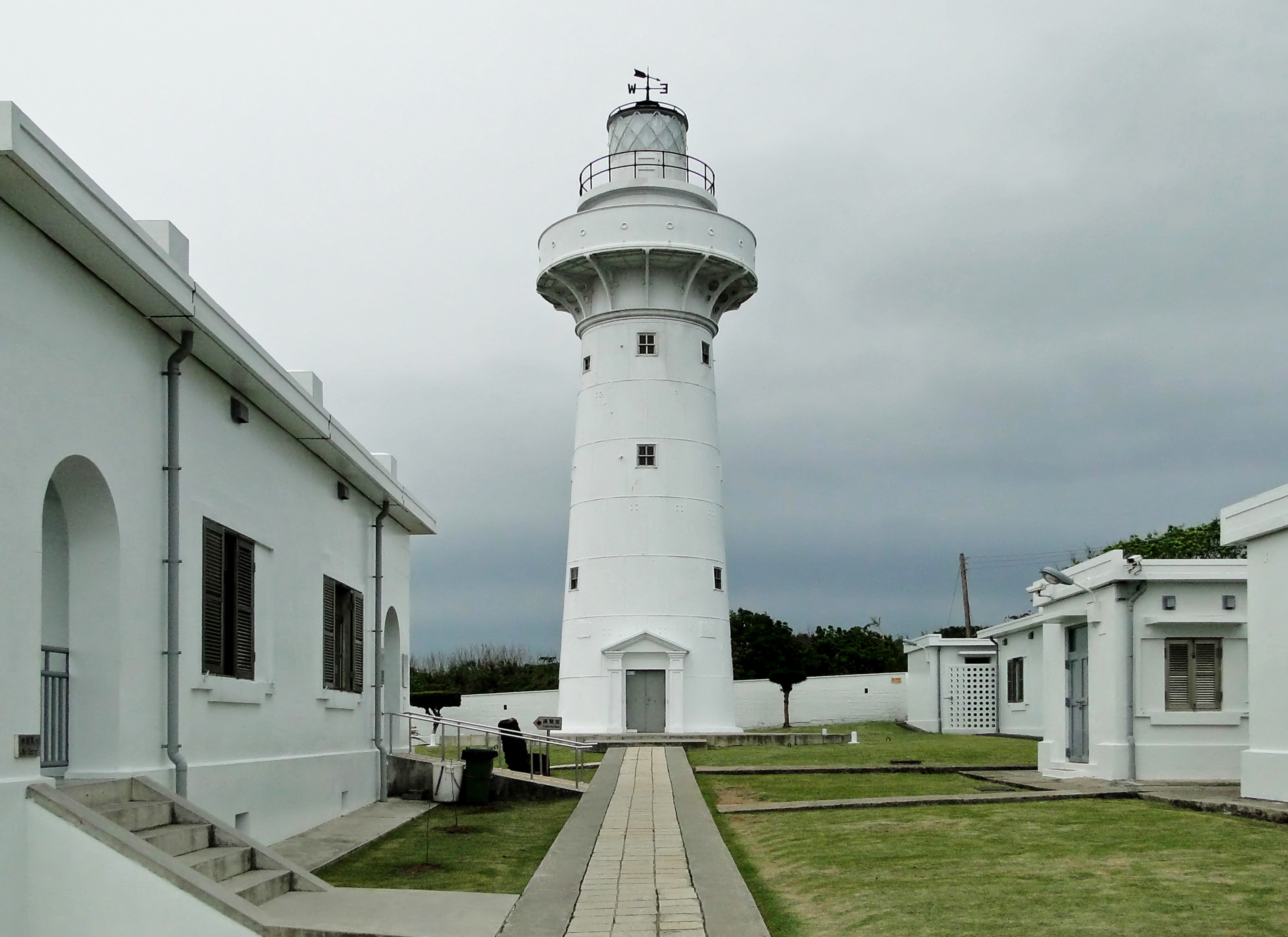
- Location: Eluanbi Village; Hengchun; Pingtung County; Taiwan
- Coordinates: 21°54′08″N 120°51′09″E

Tower
- Constructed: 1883
- Foundation: concrete and granite
- Construction: cast iron tower
- Height: 21.4 m (70 ft)
- Shape: cylindrical tower with balcony and lantern on one-story keeper's house and visitor building
- Markings: white tower, black lantern dome
- Operator: Maritime and Port Bureau

Light
- Focal height: 56.4 m (185 ft)
- Lens: Fourth order fresnel
- Intensity: 1,800,000 candela
- Range: 27.2 nmi (50.4 km; 31.3 mi)
- Characteristic: Fl W 10s.

Eluanbi Lighthouse

Chinese name
- Traditional Chinese: 鵝鑾鼻燈塔
- Simplified Chinese: 鹅銮鼻灯塔
Transcriptions
Standard Mandarin
- Hanyu Pinyin: Éluánbí Dēngtǎ
- Wade–Giles: O-luan-pi Têng-t’a
Southern Min
- Hokkien POJ: Gô-lôan-phīⁿ Teng-thah

Japanese name
- Kanji: 鵝鑾鼻灯台
- Hiragana: がらんびとうだい
Transcriptions
- Romanization: Garanbi Tōdai

Eluanbi Lighthouse is a lighthouse located on Cape Eluanbi, the southernmost point of the main island of Taiwan, which separates Taiwan's South Bay from Banana Bay and the Taiwan Strait and the South China Sea from the Philippine Sea. It is near Eluan Village in the township of Hengchun in Pingtung County, Taiwan. The lighthouse is open to the public all year around.

== Names ==
The lighthouse is named after nearby Cape Eluanbi, the southernmost point on Formosa or Taiwan Island. The name also appears as Eluan and Eluan Pi; as Oluenpi and O-luan Pi from its Wade-Giles romanization; and as Garanbi or Garambi from its Japanese pronunciation.

Eluanbi Lighthouse is also known as "The Light of East Asia" because its light is the most intense of those on Taiwan.

== History ==
=== Qing Empire ===
Shipwrecks were common around Cape Eluanbi in the early modern era owing to the nearby Qixingyan reefs and strong currents. The hostile native reactions to these accidents rose to the level of international incidents in the case of the Rover and a Ryukyu convoy, which prompted invasions from the United States and Japan in 1867 and 1874. In the latter case, the Qing Dynasty explicitly disavowed responsibility for native-held areas on Taiwan Island, creating a power vacuum that threatened Japanese or European colonization of the region. Following the advice of Charles Le Gendre, the American consul at Xiamen (then known as "Amoy"), the Viceroy of Liangjiang, Shen Baozhen, began constructing coastal defenses to improve the situation.

Construction of the Eluanbi Lighthouse fell under the purview of the British diplomat Robert Hart, inspector general of the Imperial Maritime Customs Service. He sent agents to purchase the southern cape from the leaders of the Kuie Chia Chiao (t 龜仔角, s 龟仔角, Guīzǎijiǎo) in 1875.

Construction began in 1881. Although Shen largely favored French officers like Prosper Giquel, Hart placed construction of the Eluanbi works under the English engineer John Reginald Harding and architect W. F. Spindey. Wang Fulu (t 王福祿, s 王福禄, Wáng Fúlù) oversaw the project and the 500 soldiers sent to protect it. Native opposition from the Paiwan and other local indigenous tribes was severe and sustained. The structure was the only armed lighthouse on the island, surrounded by a 6 m (20 ft) fosse provided with caponiers and barbed-wire fencing. It was riddled with gunports to allow its garrison to repel assaults. Work was finished in early 1883 and the tower began operation on 1 April. The total cost was 71,248 Mexican dollars, more than 200,000 silver taels. £5,881 were used for the tower and fort; £3,223 for the light and its housing. A great deal of the rest was used for dynamiting the coral around a nearby creek and constructing a 52 m (170 ft) concrete jetty for landing personnel and supplies; the jetty had proved necessary because of the difficult landing at Eluanbi's beaches owing to their heavy swells.

George Taylor assisted with construction after its first year and served as its first lightkeeper until 1889. He maintained close relations with the Paiwan and even became proficient in their language, but was also protected by 16 Chinese soldiers under a German officer. Their arsenal included two 18-pounder cannons, two Gatling guns, and a Cohon mortar; and they maintained food and water provisions capable of lasting a three-month siege. The station also kept a team of laborers and kitchen staff on site.

The first tower was 15 m (50 ft) high and cast iron. It was 6 m (19.5 ft) in diameter at the base and 4 m (12.66 ft) at the top. The lantern included revolving steel shutters to protect the glass from attack, and its gallery included gunports for rifles and one of the fort's Gatling guns. The foreign staff had spacious brick bungalows whose rooms were connected by bulletproof corridors to the 4 m^{2} (40 sq ft) fort; they stayed in quarters inside the tower during assaults. The Chinese staff lived in the fort at all times and maintained its kitchen, armory, storerooms, and underground cisterns.

The garrison was later reduced to eight men.

=== Imperial Japan ===
During the First Sino-Japanese War, the lighthouse was severely damaged by attack and then from sabotage by its retreating Qing garrison. After the Treaty of Shimonoseki gave Japan control of the island, colonial officials first repaired the lighthouse in 1898 and then installed a stronger light in 1910.

During World War II, the lighthouse was again seriously damaged by American bombing.

=== Republic of China ===
The lighthouse was rebuilt by the Republic of China in 1947. It was refurbished with a powerful Fresnel lens in 1962. The surrounding Eluanbi Park opened to the public on 25 December 1982 and the lighthouse itself welcomed regular visitors ten years later.

On the memorial to Eluanbi Lighthouse as one of the 8 Views of Taiwan, the Chinese "Eluanbi" is sculpted into the surface in Wang Xizhi's calligraphic style.

== Transportation ==
The lighthouse is accessible from Provincial Highway 26.

== Gallery ==
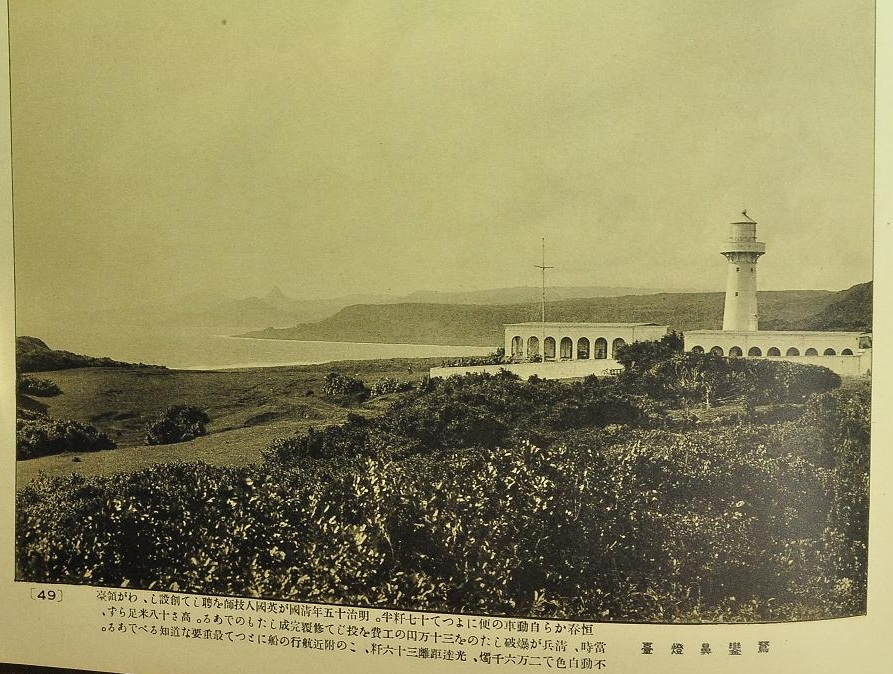
Eluanbi c. 1934

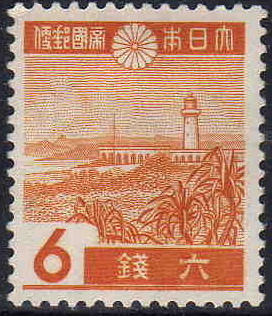
Eluanbi on a 1939 Japanese stamp

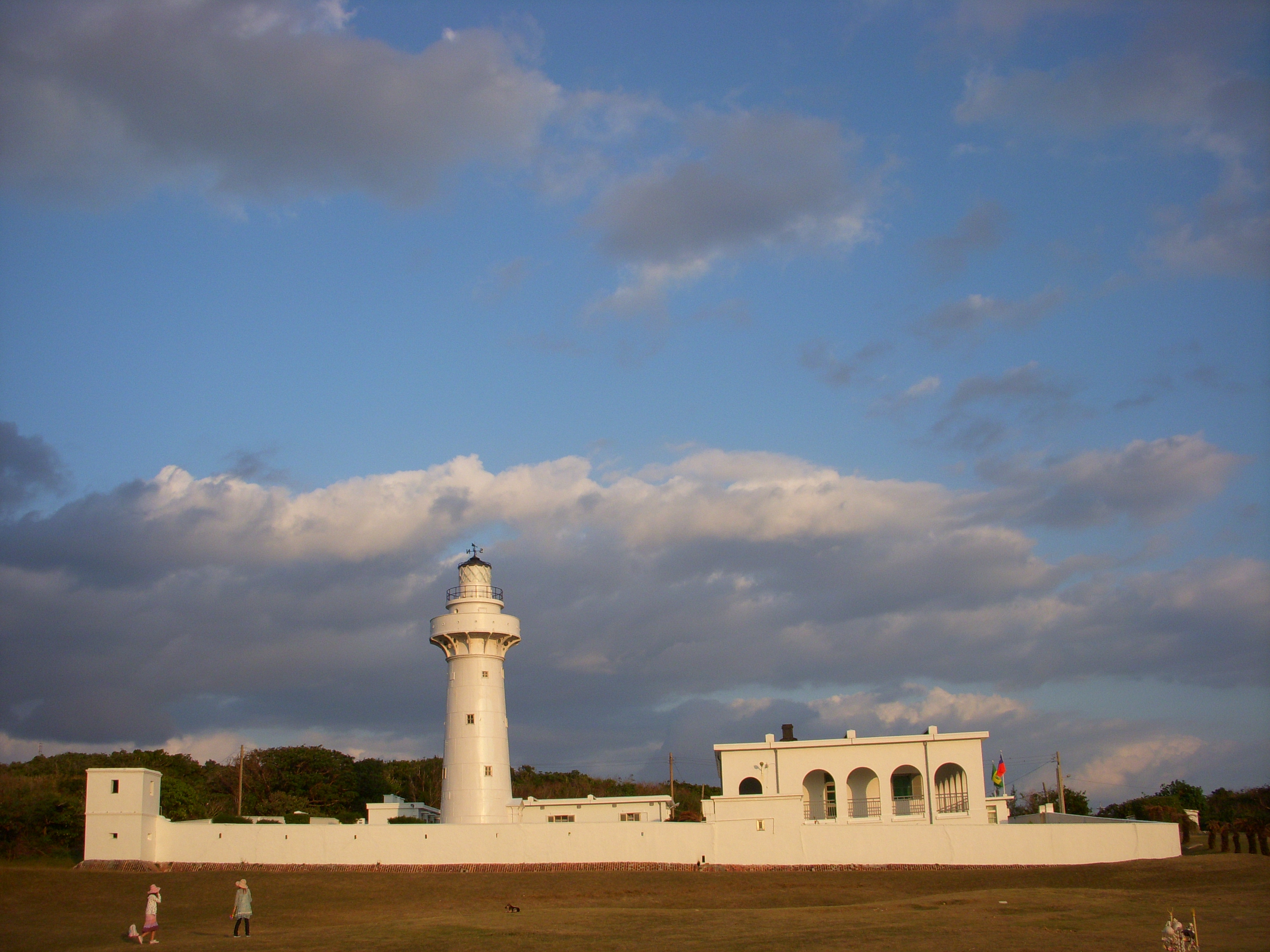
Side view (2010)

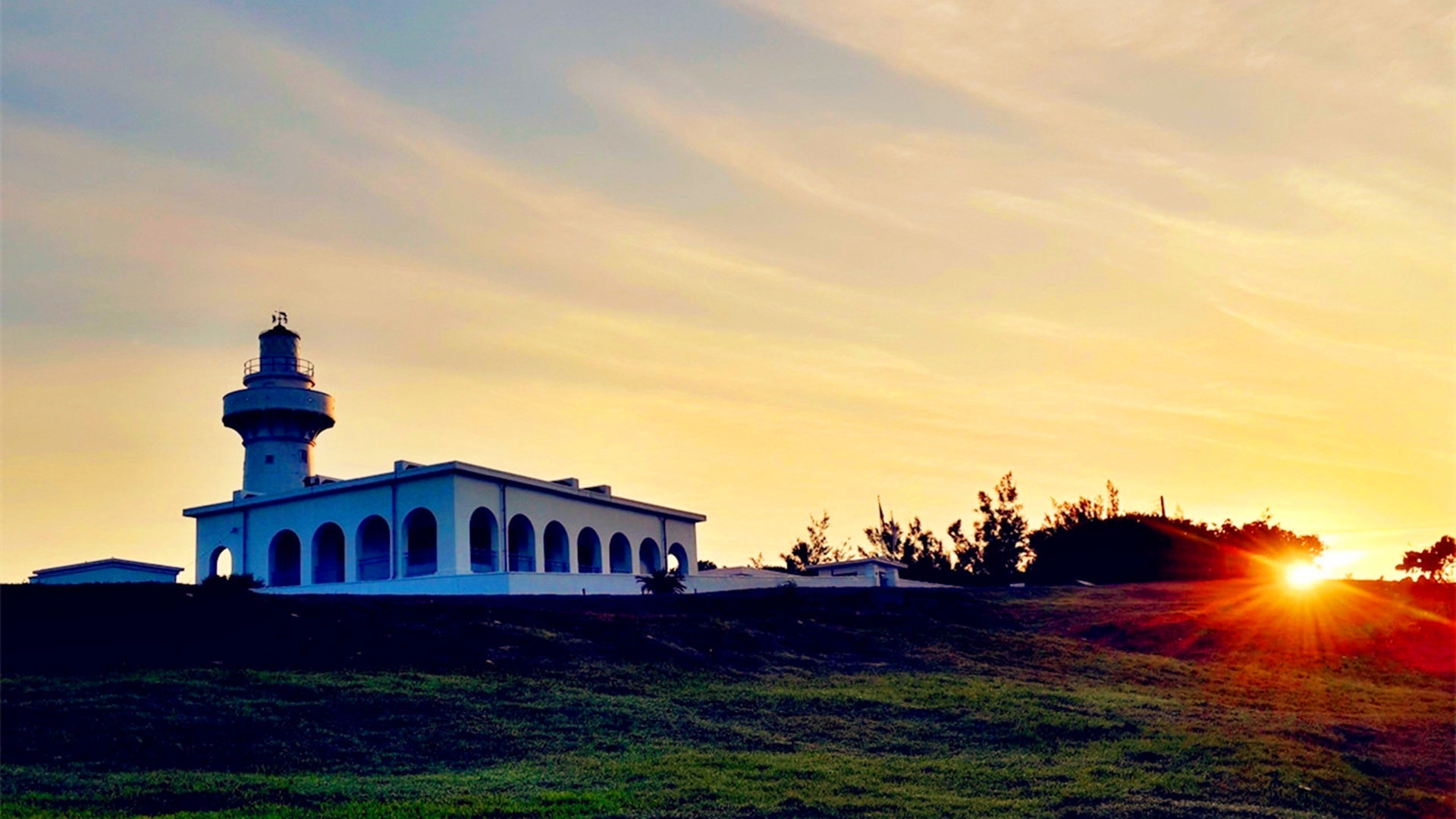
Sunrise on Cape Eluanbi (2016)

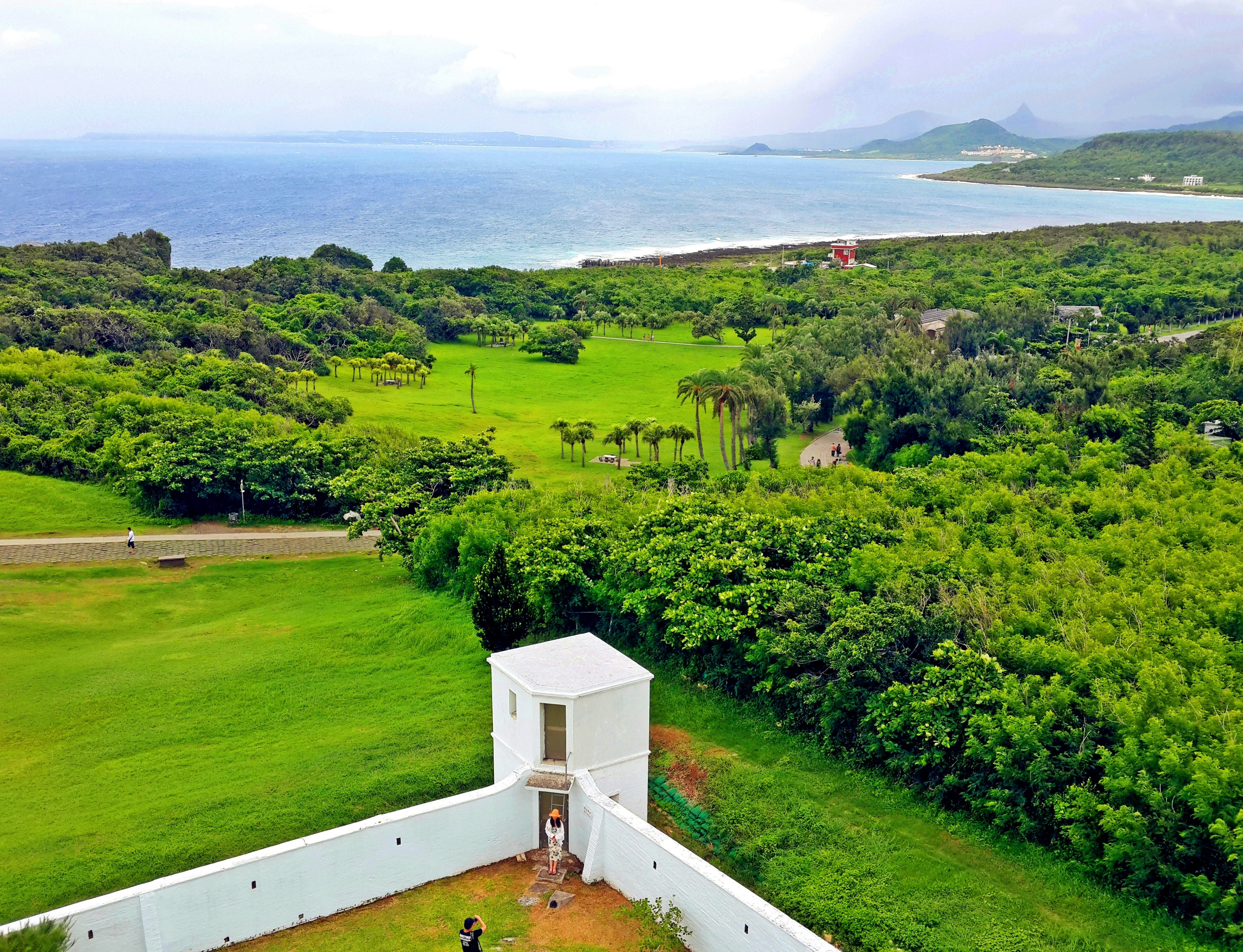
The view from Eluanbi (2017)

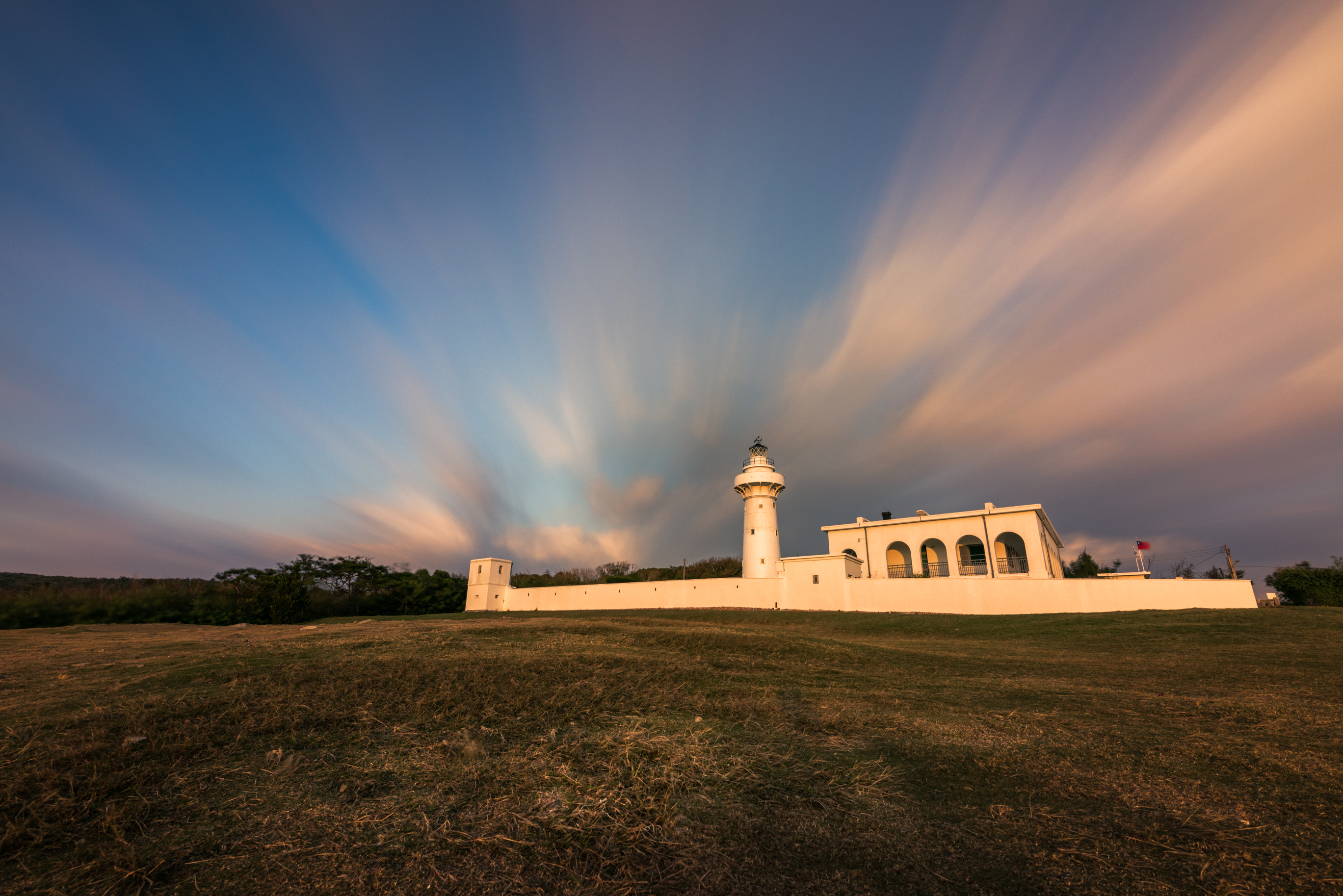
Sunset at Eluanbi (2017)

== See also ==
- List of lighthouses in Taiwan
