= Spring Scream =

Annual music festival in Taiwan

Coordinates: 21.98°N 120.797°E

Spring Scream 春天吶喊
- Genre: Music, Art, Film
- Dates: Qingming Festival, also known as Tomb-Sweeping Day, every April (清明节)
- Location: Kenting National Park (2011)
- Years active: 1995–present

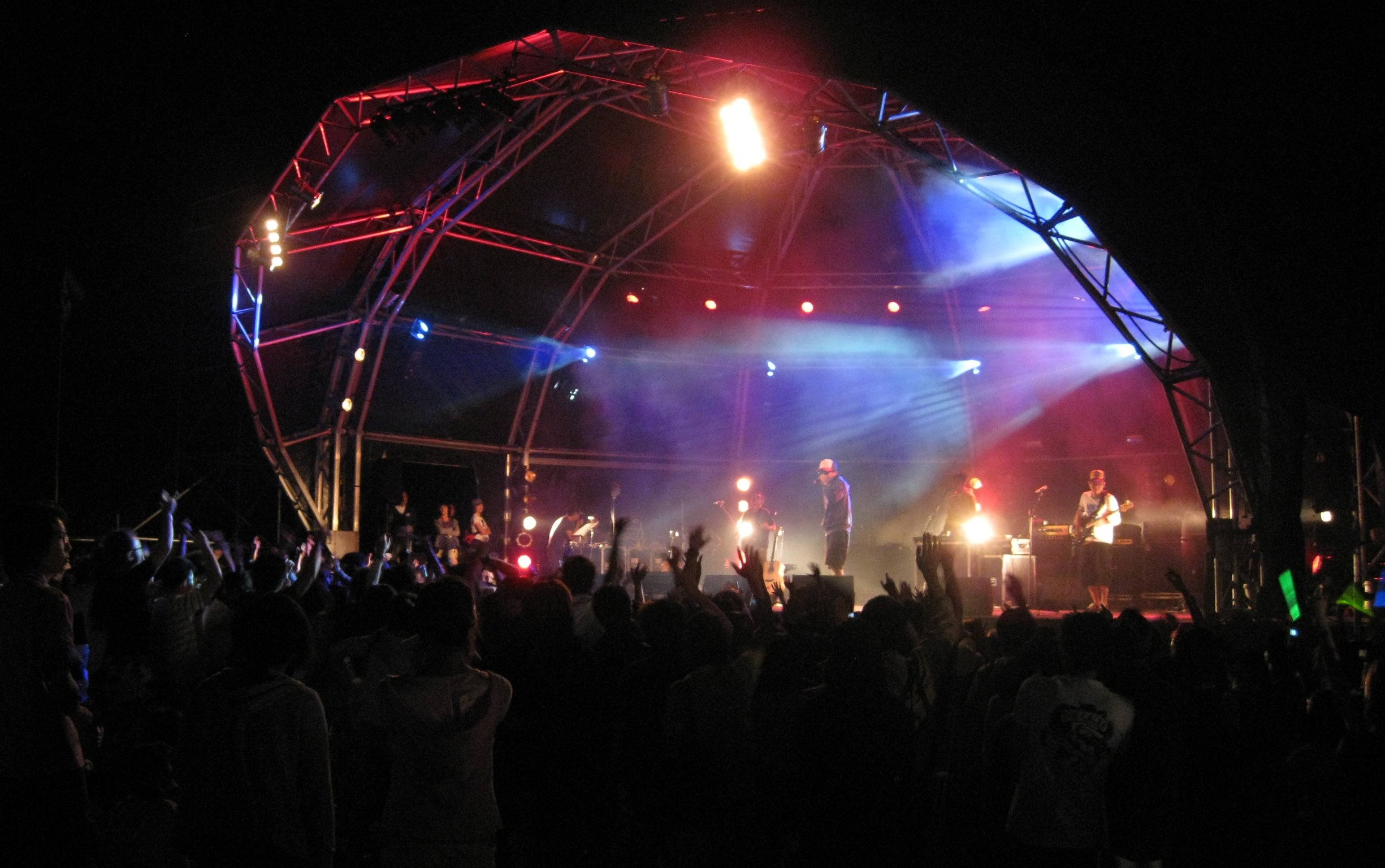
Largest stage of Spring Scream circa 2009

The Spring Scream (Chinese: 春天吶喊) is an outdoor music festival held in early April each year at Kenting, Pingtung County, Taiwan. The festival showcases a variety of music styles from bands both from Taiwan and overseas. Each year the festival adds the name of the current Chinese astrological animal to its name. The festival is organized by two expatriate Americans, Wade Davis and Jimi Moe, and has grown significantly since its beginnings in 1995.

The event length has been between 2 and 11 days and as many as 300 acts on 8 stages. It also features a film festival, art exhibits, DJs, stalls, food vendors and camping.

== Spring Scream History ==
=== 1995 ===
- Year of the Pig (豬年) 3 days, Magic Studios
- Bands had their own stalls, with hand-dyed and printed shirts

=== 1996 ===
- Year of the Rat (鼠年) 2 days, Magic Studios
- Cover:$200
- 30 bands on 2 stages
- Stalls improved, with hand-dyed and printed shirts, and artists-submitted designs for shirts

=== 1997 ===
- Year of the Ox (牛年) 3 days, Beach
- Cover:$200
- 30 bands on 2 stages

=== 1998 ===
- Year of the Tiger (虎年) 3 days, Beach
- Cover:$500
- 70 bands on 2 stages. Broadcast on MTV Asia. Concert enjoyed widespread media coverage
- Organizers required all bands to have at least one original song

=== 1999 ===
- Year of the Rabbit (兔年) 4 days, LiouFu Campground
- Cover:$500
- 80 bands on 5 stages
- Organizers required all music to be only original songs, and handed out free CDs or mp3 demo songs of bands performing
- This was the last year that bands cooked for other bands

=== 2000 ===
- Year of the Dragon (龍年) 4 days, LiouFu Campground
- Cover:$1,000.
- 120 bands.
- Media got free passes.
- Organizers again gave out free CDs of mp3 demo songs of bands performing
- This was the last year the volunteers had to cook and clean toilets

=== 2001 ===
- Year of the Snake (蛇年) 4 days, LiouFu Campground
- Cover:$1,000.
- 120 bands.
- Organizers gave out free CDs of mp3 demo songs plus pictures of bands performing.
- First year some of the stages were covered.

=== 2002 ===
- Year of the Horse (馬年) 4 days, LiouFu Campground
- Cover:$1,000.
- 150 bands.

=== 2003 ===
- Year of the Goat (羊年) 4 days, LiouFu Campground
- Cover:$1,500
- 160 bands

=== 2004 ===
- Year of the Monkey (猴年) 11 days, LiouFu Campground
- Cover:$1,500
- 200 bands
- Organizers gave out free DVDs of mp3 demo songs and pictures from all bands who applied to play
- Start of the film festival contest

=== 2005 ===
- Year of the Rooster (雞年) 4 days, LiouFu Campground
- Cover:$1,500
- 160 Bands
- Start of the poster contest and the logo contest

=== 2006 ===
- Year of the Dog (狗年) 4 days, LiouFu Campground
- Cover:$1,500
- 160 bands

=== 2007 ===
- Year of the Pig (豬年) 4 days, Erluanbi and ShauKenting Rodeo
- Cover:$1,500
- 230 bands
- Added pop artists who do original compositions

=== 2008 ===
- Year of the Rat (鼠年) 4 days, Erluanbi Lighthouse Area.
- Cover: $1,600
- 270 bands

== See also ==
- Taiwanese rock
