= Rover incident =

International incident in Taiwan

- Traditional Chinese: 羅妹號事件
- Simplified Chinese: 罗妹号事件
Transcriptions
Standard Mandarin
- Hanyu Pinyin: Luófāháo shìjiàn
Southern Min
- Hokkien POJ: Lô-mōe-hō Sū-kiāⁿ

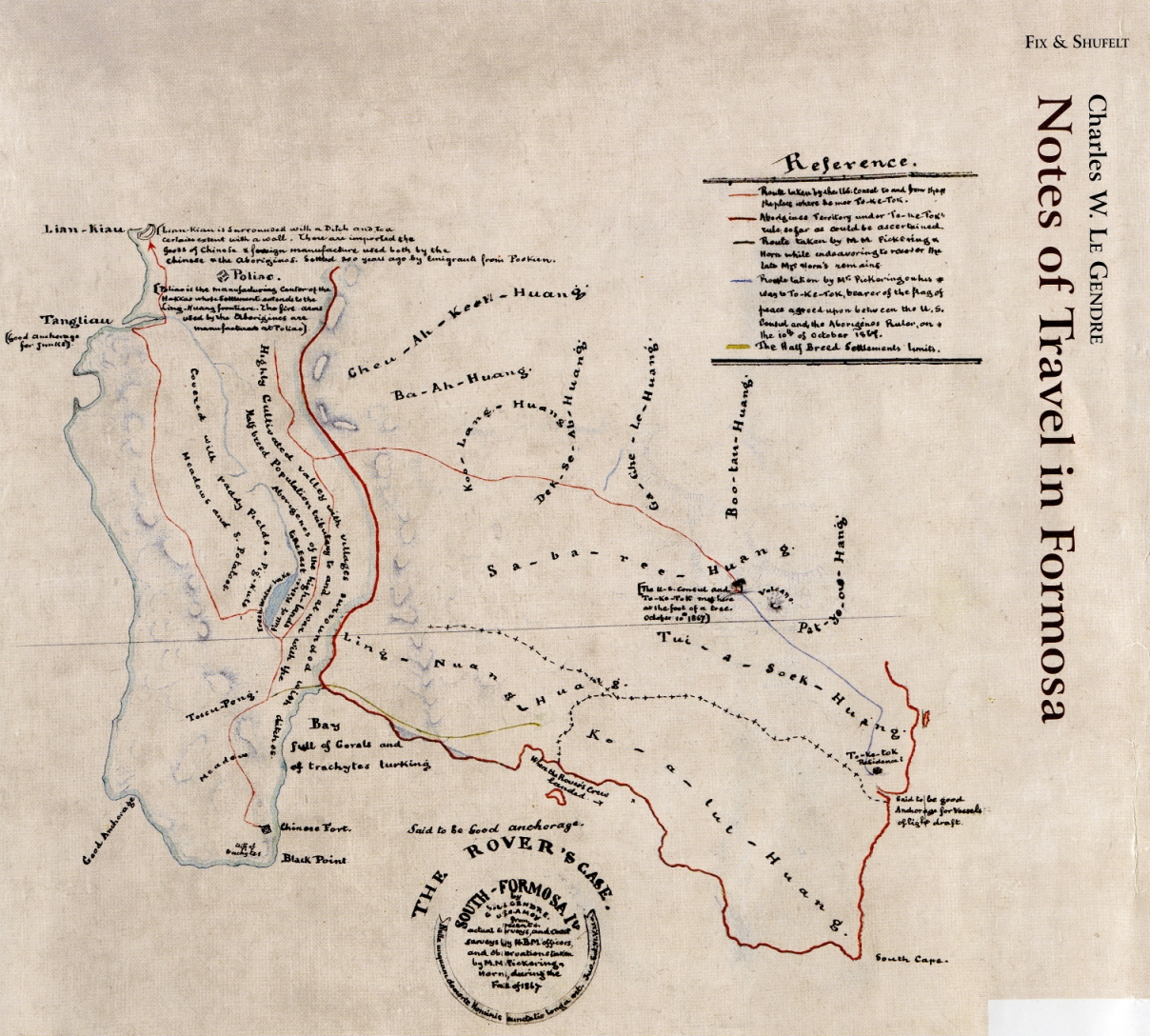
Map of the area drawn by Charles W. Le Gendre showing "Where the Rover's Crew landed" (bottom middle of map).

The Rover Incident (Chinese: 羅妹號事件; Pe̍h-ōe-jī: Lô-mōe-hō Sū-kiāⁿ or Chinese: 羅妹號慘案; Pe̍h-ōe-jī: Lô-mōe-hō Chhám-àn) occurred on 12 March 1867 when the American merchant ship Rover, captained by Joseph Hunt who was accompanied by his wife Mercy G. Beerman Hunt, and en route from Shantou to Niuzhuang, was wrecked off the coast of Taiwan, then ruled by the Qing dynasty. The ship struck a coral reef called Qixingyan near Cape Eluanbi and drifted into the area of Kenting in modern-day Hengchun, Pingtung County, Taiwan. Fourteen American sailors, including Hunt and his wife, were killed by the indigenous Paiwan people in revenge for earlier killings of Kulaljuc (Chinese: 龜仔甪; pinyin: Guīzǐlù) tribe members by foreigners. Subsequently, the U.S. military decided to send a military expedition against the tribe members responsible.

== Shipwreck ==
On 12 March 1867, the American barque Rover shipwrecked at the southern tip of Taiwan. The vessel sank but the captain, his wife, and some men escaped on two boats. One boat landed at a small bay near the Bi Mountains inhabited by the Kulaljuc tribe of the Paiwan people. The Kulaljuc inhabitants captured them and mistook the captain's wife for a man. They killed her. The captain, two white men, and the Chinese sailors save for one who managed to escape to Takau, were also killed. The Cormorant, a British steamer, tried to help and landed near the shipwreck on 26 March. The aborigines fired muskets and shot arrows at them, forcing them to retreat. The American Asiatic Fleet's Henry H. Bell also landed at the Bi Mountains where they became lost, suffered heatstroke, and then was ambushed by the aborigines, losing an officer.

== American reaction ==
Following the wreck of the United States ship and killing of the surviving crew by aborigines, the American Consul to Amoy Charles William Le Gendre quickly traveled to Fuzhou, arriving on 2 April 1867, to persuade the Viceroys of Fujian and Zhejiang to intervene and put pressure on the Chinese authorities in Taiwan to resolve the issue. The Viceroy of Fujian gave Le Gendre permission to go to Taiwan himself and wrote him a letter of introduction to take to the prefect of Taiwan asking him to cooperate with Le Gendre; but the Viceroy also added that "if the consul takes measures to manage the case himself, please invite him not to do so, for these savages might give him more trouble that he thinks." Le Gendre commissioned the United States steamer Ashuelot, under the command of Captain John C. Febiger, in order to visit the scene of the wreck and to try (unsuccessfully) to get foreign officials in Taiwanfu (Taiwan's then-capital and modern day Tainan, where he arrived on 18 April) to act. After a subsequent failed punitive expedition carried out by Rear Admiral Henry H. Bell of the United States Navy, Le Gendre again returned to Taiwan—this time without any reference to his superiors. While in Taiwan, he asserted United States consular authority, selected a deputy consul in north Taiwan, visited the Keelung mines, and gathered information from United States merchants.

On June 19, one hundred and eighty-one officers, sailors, and marines provided with four days' rations and water landed in Taiwan under Commander George Belknap of the USS Hartford who was accompanied by Lieutenant Commander Alexander Slidell MacKenzie, fleet lieutenant as second in command. In the terrible heat, it was "almost impossible to conduct operations in the middle of the day, and many of the party were attacked by sunstroke. The savages, who had taken up a position in the jungle behind rocks and other places invisible...kept up a heavy fire whenever their foes appeared." MacKenzie received a mortal wound to his chest from enemy fire. The American force was "compelled to withdraw in some confusion to the ships and soon departed from the island".

The marines were under the command of Captain James Forney, who submitted the following report to Commander Belknap, dated on board the flagship Hartford, at sea, June 17:

"I have the honor herewith to submit a brief report of the part taken by the Marines on the 13th inst., on the island of Formosa. On the first landing, by your order, I took charge of twenty Marines, deploying them forward as skirmishers. A dense and almost impenetrable thicket of bush prevented the men from advancing very rapidly. I penetrated with them to a creek about half a mile from the beach without meeting any of the enemy, and was then recalled for further orders. You then instructed me to leave a sergeant and five men on the beach, and to advance with the main body, headed by yourself. In consequence of all further operations coming under your own observation, I have nothing further to report, except that the men behaved gallantly, and deserve credit for the manner in which they marched over such a rough and hilly country, and under such intense, scorching heat... The entire number of Marines on shore was forty-three, thirty-one of whom were from this ship, and twelve from the USS Wyoming."

=== Second visit ===
Upon return to South China, Le Gendre managed to persuade the Viceroy in Fuzhou to send a military force to Southern Taiwan. The force, significantly smaller than the 400 to 500 soldiers recommended by Le Gendre, was dispatched on 25 July 1867. Le Gendre then personally requested a gunboat from Admiral Bell, which he was denied, and eventually managed to commission the steamship Volunteer. He embarked for Taiwan on 4 September 1867 telling his superiors that "I am going there as a mere spectator.. . . I have no jurisdiction over the Chinese forces."

Le Gendre quickly assumed de facto command of the mission from General Liu in the course of a long and difficult march into deep aboriginal lands in southern Taiwan (some of which required extensive road construction). Then, with the aid of William A. Pickering and James Horn, Le Gendre negotiated a Memorandum of the Understanding with Tauketok (南岬之盟) guaranteeing the safety of shipwrecked American and European sailors with Tok-a-Tok (c. 1817–1874), (Note: His Paiwan name was written in Chinese characters as 卓杞篤 or 卓其督, both pronounced Tok-ki-tok in Hokkien. These names were also transcribed into English as Toketok or Tauketok.) the chief of 18 Paiwan aboriginal tribes in the area when the Rover had gone ashore.

Tanketok (Toketok), explained that a long time ago the white men came and almost exterminated the Kulaljuc tribe and their ancestors passed down their desire for revenge. They came to an oral agreement that the mountain aborigines would not kill any more castaways, would care for them and hand them over to the Chinese at Langqiao. Le Gendre visited the tribe again in February 1869 and signed an agreement with them in English. It was later discovered that Tanketok did not have absolute control over the tribes and some of them paid him no heed. Le Gendre castigated China as a semi-civilized power for not fulfilling the obligation of the law of nations, which is to seize the territory of a "wild race" and to confer upon it the benefits of civilization. Since China failed to prevent the aborigines from killing subjects or citizens of civilized countries, "we see the rights of the Emperor of China over aboriginal Formosa, such as we have said, are not absolute, as long as she remains uncivilized..." Le Gendre later moved to Japan and worked with the Japanese government as a foreign advisor on their China policy, including the development of the concept of the "East Asian crescent". According to the "East Asian crescent" concept, Japan should control Korea, Taiwan, and Ryukyu to affirm its position in East Asia.

== Influence ==
Following the Rover Incident in 1867, another shipwreck triggered the Mudan Incident which subsequently was the justification for the Empire of Japan to invade and occupy a part of Taiwan in 1874, a decade later the French General Jacques Duchesne defeated the Chinese up the Keelung River. In addition, the Qing court established the Hengchun lighthouse (1888; now Eluanbi Lighthouse) for the protection of the Taiwan Strait and vessels transiting the Bashi Channel.

== TV Mini Series from 2021 ==
In 2021 Public Television Service (PTS) of Taiwan has released a ten part mini-series named Seqalu: Formosa 1867 ( 斯卡羅) about the incident. Seqalu refers to the name of a Paiwan-Puyuma nation that existed from 1600 to 1931.

== See also ==
- Mudan incident
- Small Wars Manual
- Taiwan Expedition of 1874
- Formosa Expedition of 1867
- Princess Babao Temple
