= Sail Rock (Taiwan) =

Rock in Hengchun, Pingtung County, Taiwan

Sail Rock 船帆石
- Sea stack
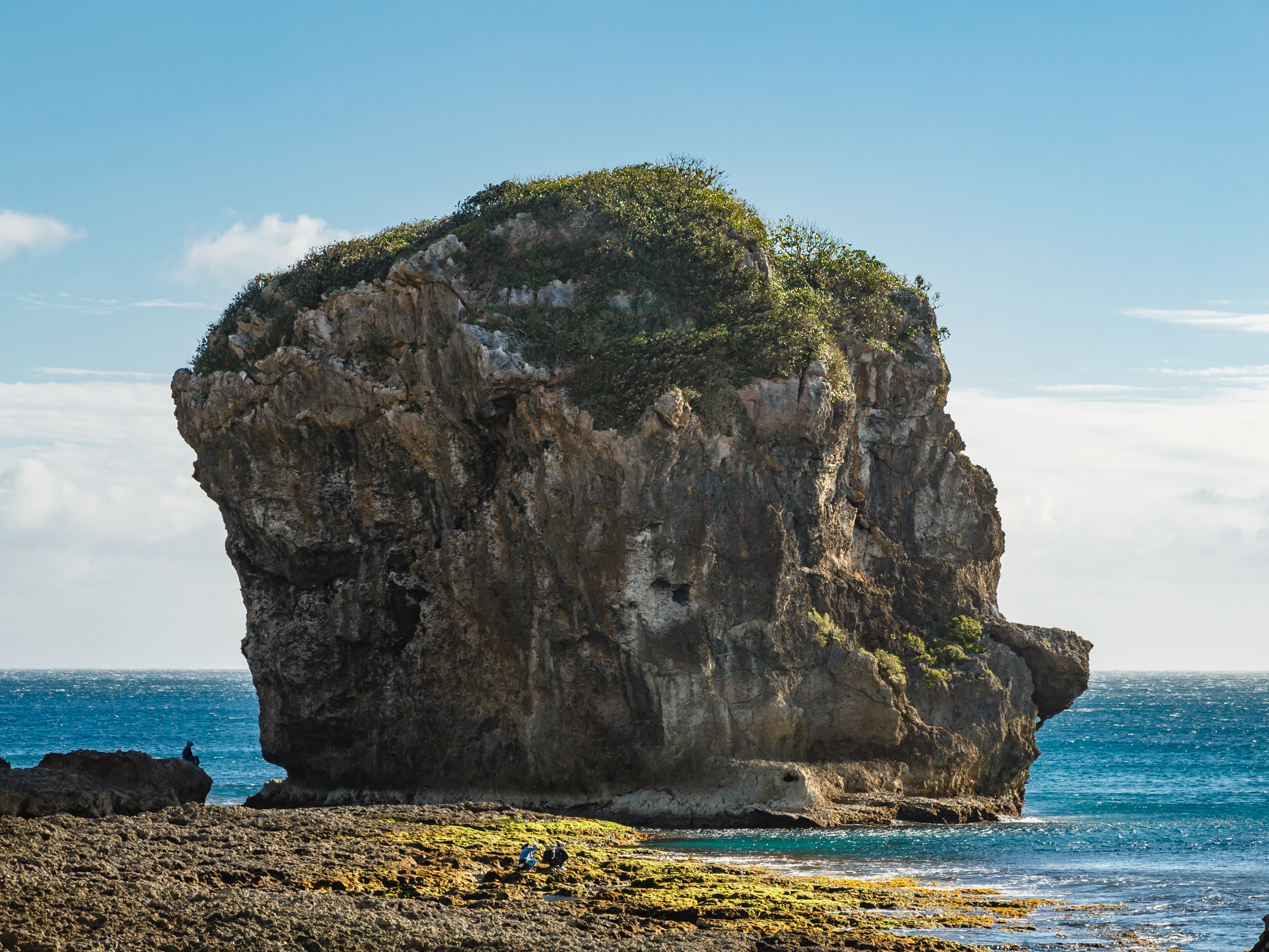

- Coordinates: 21°55′52.3″N 120°49′26.1″E
- Location: Hengchun, Pingtung County, Taiwan
- Geology: rock

The Sail Rock (Chinese: 船帆石; pinyin: Chuánfān Shí) is a rock in Hengchun Township, Pingtung County, Taiwan. The rock is part of Kenting National Park.

== Name ==
The name of the rock is derived from its shape which resembles a sailing ship.

== History ==
The rock broke off from the nearby table connecting it to Pingtung mainland.

== See also ==
- Geology of Taiwan
