= Kenting National Park =

National park on the Hengchun Peninsula, Taiwan

- IUCN category II (national park)
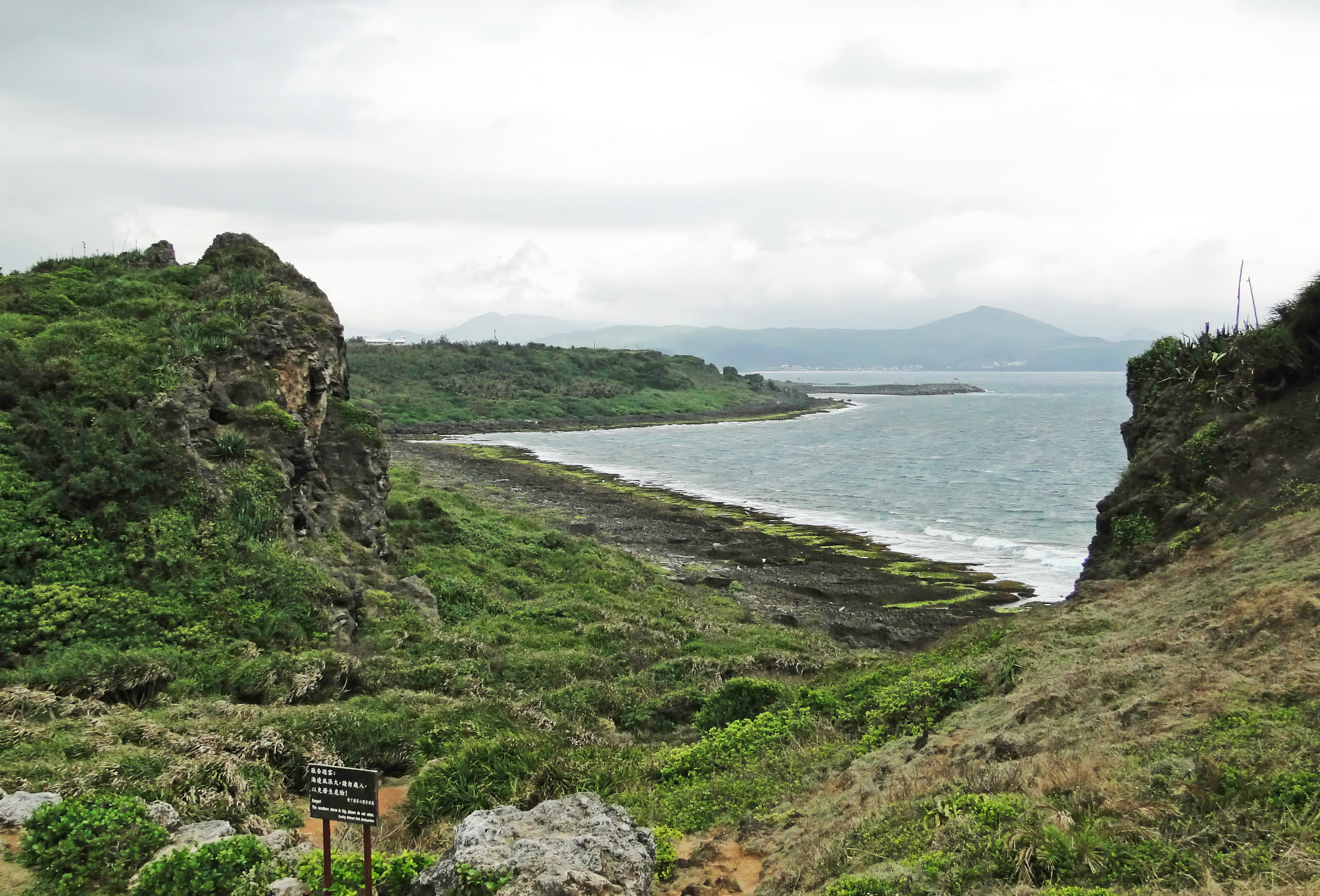
- Cape Maobitou in Kenting National Park

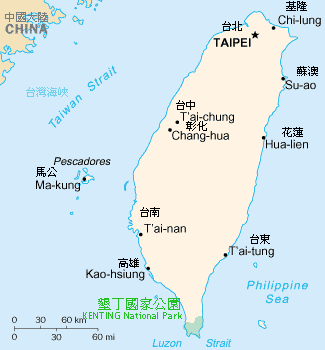
- Location of Kenting National Park in Taiwan
- Location: Taiwan
- Nearest city: Hengchun
- Coordinates: 21.98°N 120.797°E
- Area: 333 km^{2} (129 sq mi)
- Established: 1 January 1984
- Visitors: 8,376,708 (in 2014)
- Governing body: Kenting National Park Headquarters, National Park Service, Ministry of the Interior, Taiwan
- Website: www.ktnp.gov.tw

Kenting National Park
- Traditional Chinese: 墾丁國家公園
- Simplified Chinese: 垦丁国家公园
Transcriptions
Standard Mandarin
- Hanyu Pinyin: Kěndīng Guójiā Gōngyuán
- Wade–Giles: K'en^{3}-ting^{1} Kuo^{2}-chia^{1} Kung^{1}-yüan^{2}
Southern Min
- Hokkien POJ: Khún-teng kok-ka kong-hn̂g

Kenting National Park (Chinese: 墾丁國家公園; pinyin: Kěndīng Gúojiā Gōngyuán), commonly known as Kenting (Chinese: 墾丁; pinyin: Kěndīng), is a national park located on the Hengchun Peninsula of Pingtung County, Taiwan, covering Hengchun, Checheng, and Manzhou Townships. Established on 1 January 1984, it is Taiwan's oldest and the southernmost national park on the main island, covering the southernmost area of the Taiwan island along Bashi Channel. Administered by the National Park Service of the Ministry of the Interior, this national park is well known for its tropical climate and sunshine, scenic mountain and beach, the Spring Scream rock-band festival held in every March, and has long been one of the most popular tourist destinations in Taiwan with 5.84 million visitors in 2016.

== Etymology ==
Kenting (墾丁, Kun-ting in Taiwanese) means pathfinders or pioneers.

== Geography ==
The park covers about 181 square kilometres (70 mi^{2}) of land, 152 square kilometres (59 mi^{2}) of sea, weighing in at 333 square kilometres (129 mi^{2}) combined. Nan Wan and Banana Bay (香蕉灣) is surrounded by the Pacific Ocean, the Taiwan Strait, and the Luzon Strait. The park is 90 kilometres (56 mi) away from Kaohsiung, 140 kilometres (87 mi) away from Tainan.

The landscape boasted by Kenting National Park is divided into two parts by the long and narrow Hengchun Longitudinal Valley Plain that extends from north to south. With coral sea cliffs teemed with fringing reefs along the west coast, the park features a large number of mountains in the north, and coral tablelands and foothills in the south. The plain, which is formed by fault valleys, has a vast lake called Longluan Lake, together with rising coral tablelands and limestone caves to the east. The east side of the coral tablelands features unique sand rivers and sand waterfalls formed by the combined effects of winds and rivers, as well as coral cliffs, sunken caves and stalactites.

=== Climate ===
Kenting is known for its tropical climate with warm to hot weather year-round. Along with the rest of Pingtung, the climate is geographically classified as a tropical monsoon climate.

Climate data for Kenting National Park (1991–2020 normals)
Month	Jan	Feb	Mar	Apr	May	Jun	Jul	Aug	Sep	Oct	Nov	Dec	Year
Mean daily maximum °C (°F)	24.7 (76.5)	25.6 (78.1)	27.3 (81.1)	29.4 (84.9)	30.9 (87.6)	31.6 (88.9)	32.0 (89.6)	31.7 (89.1)	31.3 (88.3)	29.9 (85.8)	28.1 (82.6)	25.5 (77.9)	29.0 (84.2)
Daily mean °C (°F)	21.1 (70.0)	21.7 (71.1)	23.3 (73.9)	25.3 (77.5)	27.2 (81.0)	28.3 (82.9)	28.6 (83.5)	28.3 (82.9)	27.7 (81.9)	26.4 (79.5)	24.7 (76.5)	22.1 (71.8)	25.4 (77.7)
Mean daily minimum °C (°F)	18.5 (65.3)	18.9 (66.0)	20.3 (68.5)	22.2 (72.0)	24.2 (75.6)	25.4 (77.7)	25.7 (78.3)	25.3 (77.5)	24.9 (76.8)	23.9 (75.0)	22.3 (72.1)	19.8 (67.6)	22.6 (72.7)
Average precipitation mm (inches)	35.7 (1.41)	33.0 (1.30)	22.4 (0.88)	42.3 (1.67)	135.5 (5.33)	309.5 (12.19)	343.8 (13.54)	445.7 (17.55)	315.9 (12.44)	149.6 (5.89)	74.7 (2.94)	38.7 (1.52)	1,946.8 (76.66)
Average precipitation days	7.0	5.6	3.4	4.5	8.6	12.7	13.8	14.8	12.5	8.3	5.6	5.7	102.5
Average relative humidity (%)	73.6	74.5	74.3	75.8	78.4	83.3	83.2	83.0	80.4	74.1	72.9	72.2	77.1
Mean monthly sunshine hours	172.1	167.5	196.4	197.1	183.2	171.4	187.7	171.9	186.3	203.4	186.2	164.5	2,187.7
Source: Central Weather Administration (precipitation days 1995–2020)

== Biodiversity ==
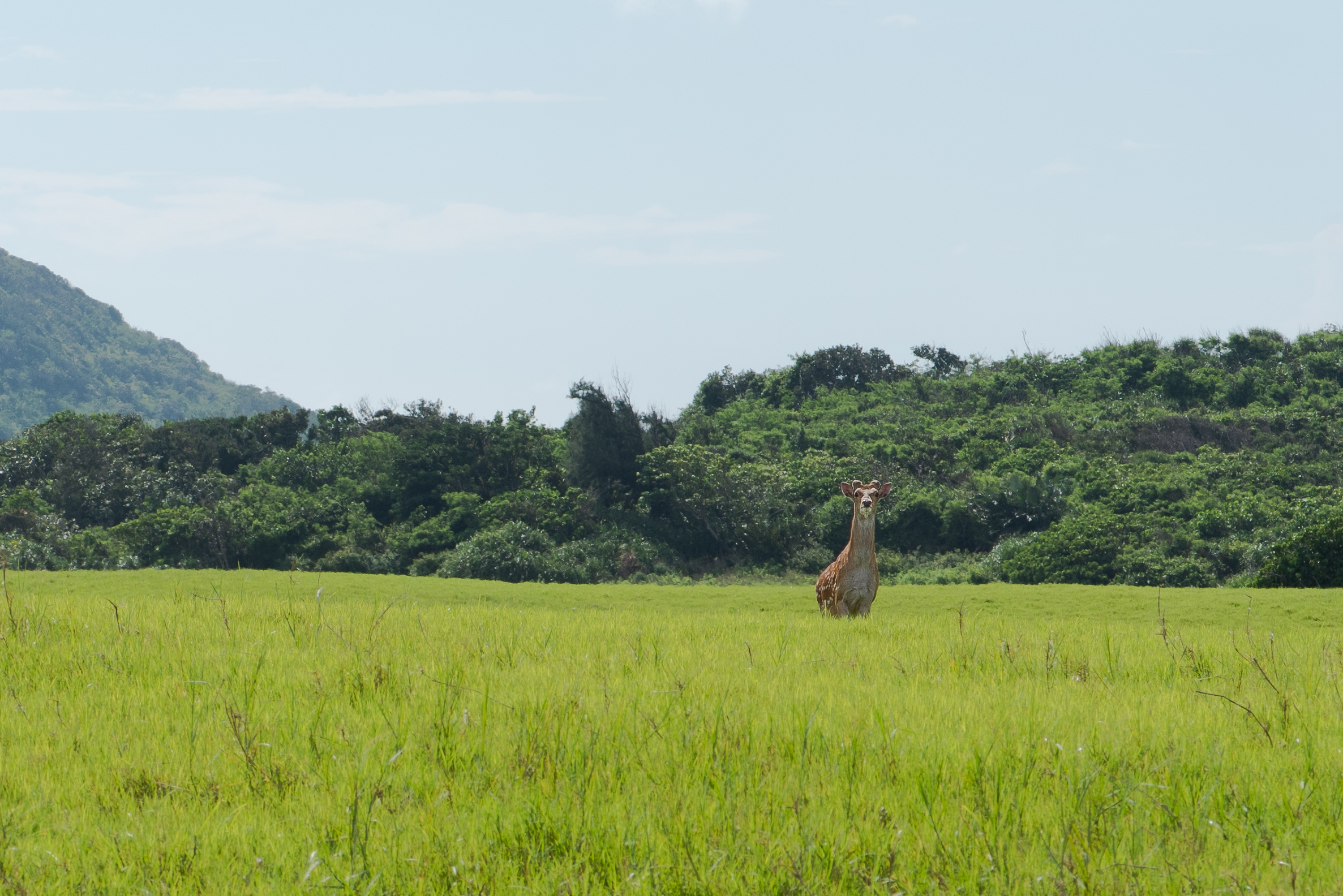
Formosan sika deer

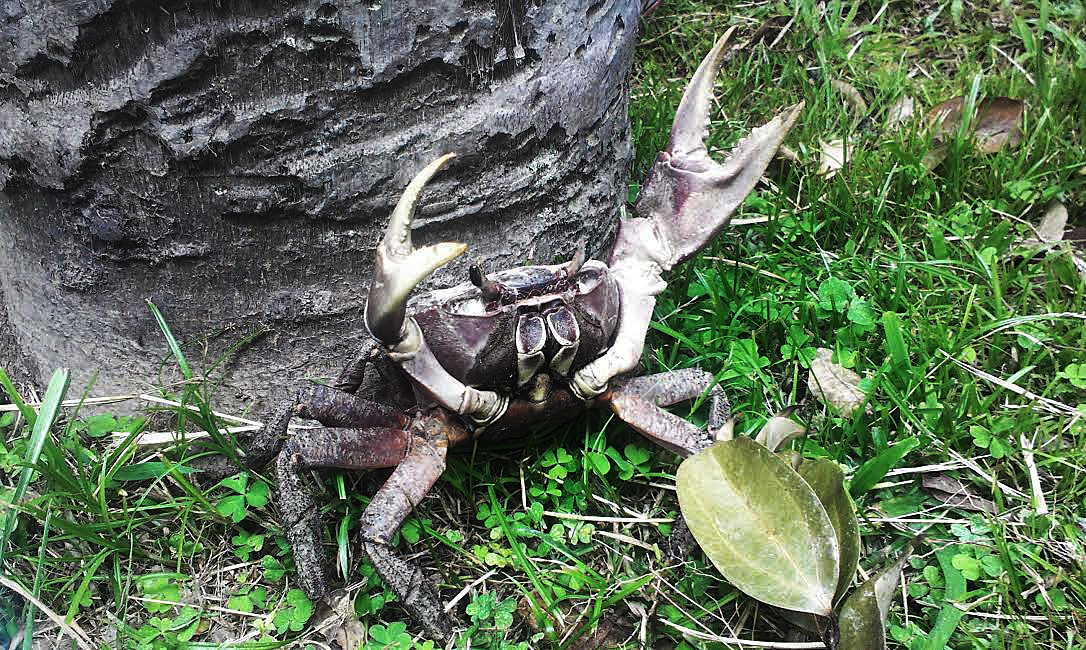
Terrestrial crab

The park hosts rich terrestrial biodiversity of fauna and flora including 15 species of mammals, 310 species of birds, 59 species of reptiles and amphibians, 21 species of freshwater fish, 216 species of butterflies, and various insects.

Eluanbi Park or Oluanpi Park (鹅鑾鼻公園) is located at Cape Eluanbi. Nature reserves such as the Longkeng Ecological Protection Area (龍坑生態保護區) protecting coral reefs and virgin forest of Banana Bay and Hengchun Peninsula. 26 species of land crabs inhabit in the area and which is the highest diversity of terrestrial crabs in single areas in the world. 34 species of terrestrial mammals have been recorded, including 5 that are locally extinct (such as the Formosan clouded leopard) and 4 that are introduced (such as the water buffalo). Formosan sika deer which became extinct in the wild in 1969, were first reintroduced into Kenting National Park in 1994. Aside from sika deer, It was thought that 6 species of terrestrial mammals were extinct in the area, but the critically endangered Chinese pangolin was rediscovered a decade later.

Ocean currents which flows off the park provides rich diversities of marine ecosystems including sea birds, sea turtles including critically endangered hawksbill turtles, sharks such as bull sharksmanta-rays, and whale sharks, and smaller to medium-sized cetaceans. The area was once a major wintering ground for sperm and baleen whales especially humpback whales that migrated into Nan Wan and Banana Bay. Japanese whaling during Japanese colonial days, led to severe depletions or disappearances of whales in consequence. Today, no or very few whales may constantly migrate along Hengchun Peninsula and into the park's waters. Dugongs, thought to be either fully or functionally extinct in Taiwan, were reported in the 1950s and 60s, and these were some of the last report of the species in Taiwanese waters.

The national park is an important stopover on the migration path of the gray-faced buzzard.

== Lighthouse ==
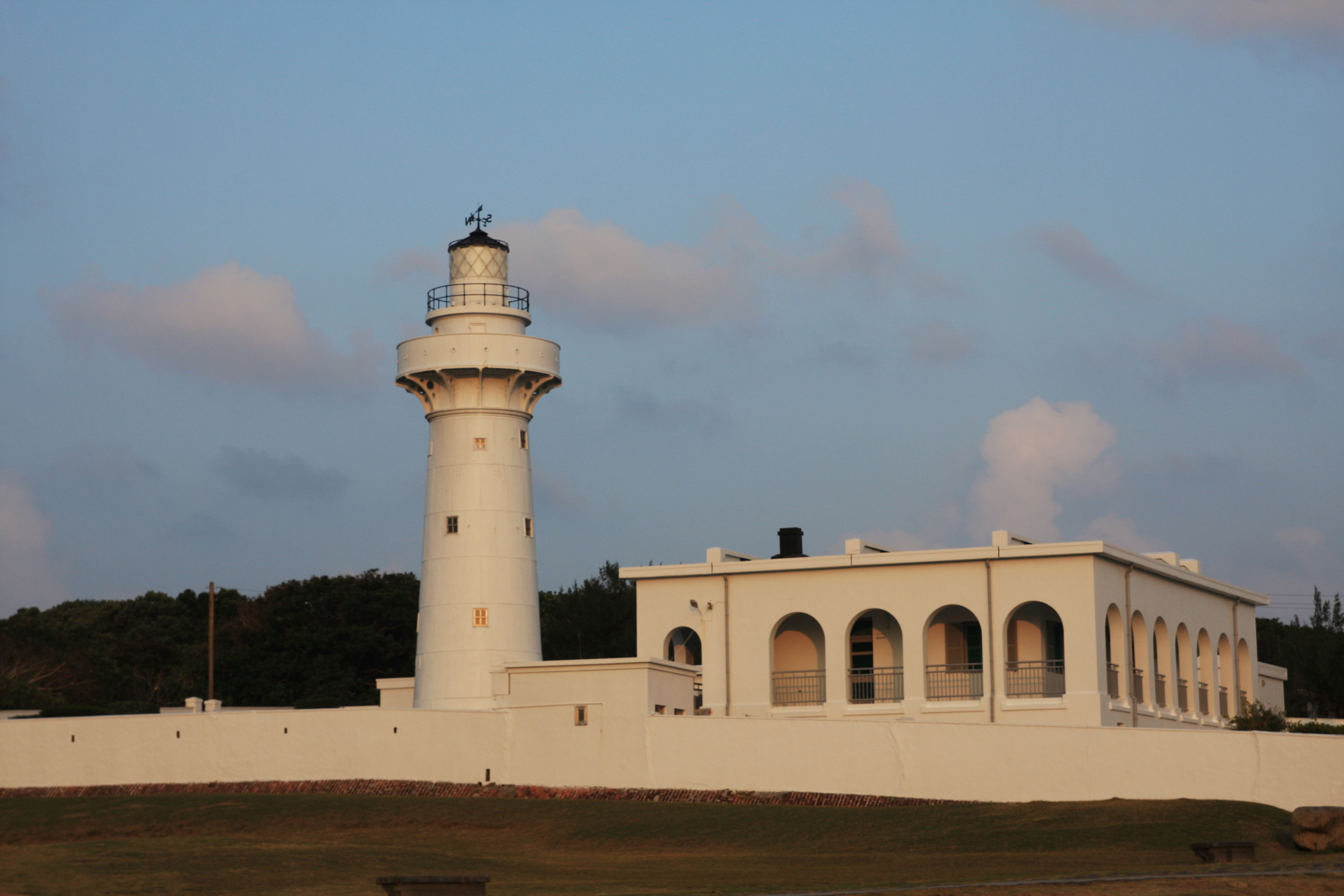
Eluanbi lighthouse

Eluanbi Lighthouse was completed in 1883, following requests from the American and Japanese governments to the Chinese government after several shipwrecks occurred in the 1860s (including the Rover incident). Chinese troops had to be sent to protect the lighthouse during construction from attacks by local tribesmen, and the lighthouse was surrounded by a fort with cannons and a ditch for protection. It is one of the rare examples in the world of a fortified lighthouse. The lighthouse itself is 21.4 metres (70 ft) high and its light is 56.4 metres (185 ft) above the tidal high water. The light flashes every 10 seconds and its range is 27.2 nautical miles (50.4 km).

== Transportation ==
- Bus: Frequent buses link this park with Kaohsiung International Airport, Taiwan Railway's Kaohsiung Station and the Taiwan High Speed Rail Zuoying Station, a journey of 2.5 hours.
- Air: This park is served by the domestic Hengchun Airport although flights are rare and are subject to cancellation due to the strong Katabatic wind which is frequent in the Hengchun Peninsula.

== In popular culture ==
- Spring Scream: A well-known international rock-band festival held inside this park since 1995.
- Most parts of the 2008 film Cape No. 7 were filmed inside this park, and nearby Hengchun.
- Part of the 2012 film Life of Pi was filmed inside the park, which is not far from its director Ang Lee's birthplace.

== Gallery ==
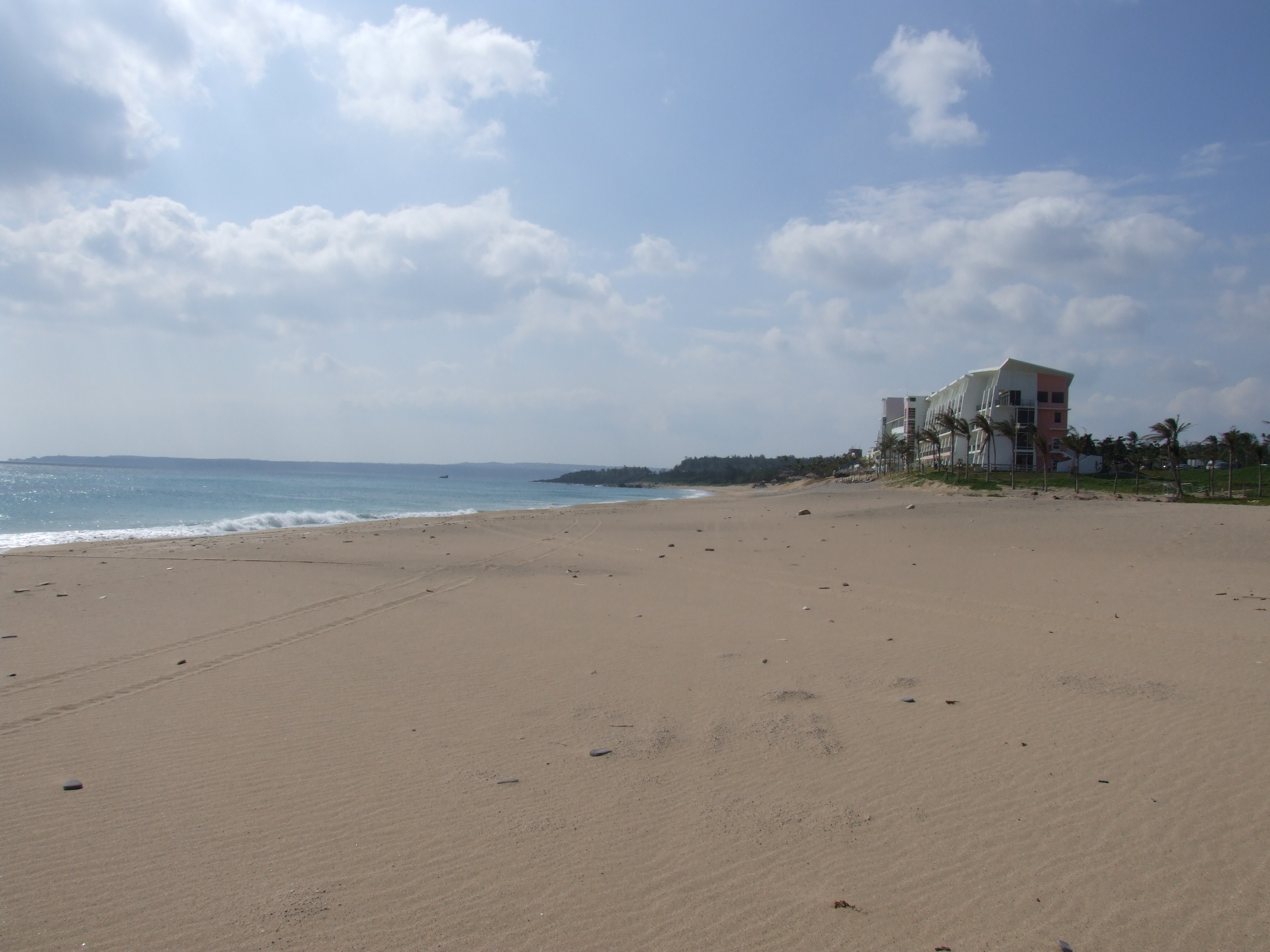
Beach view from Kenting beach

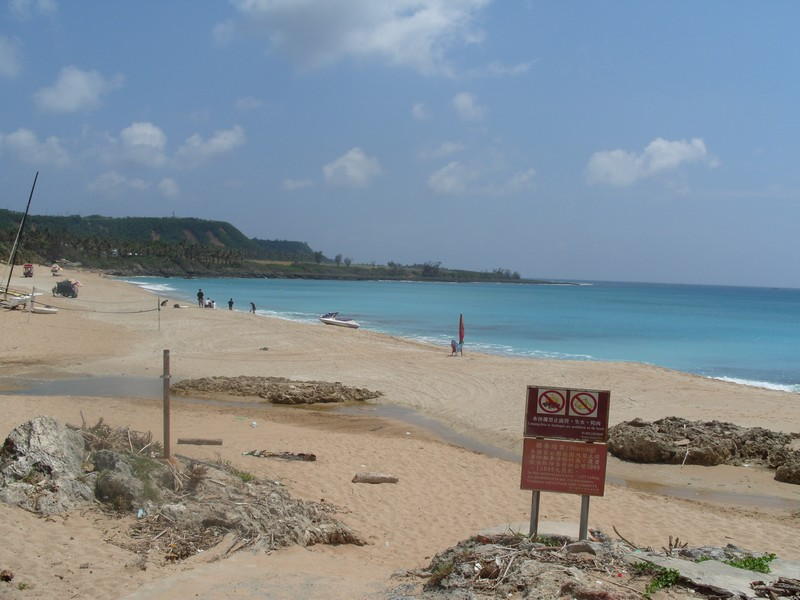
Another beach in Kenting, Baishawan, White Sand beach

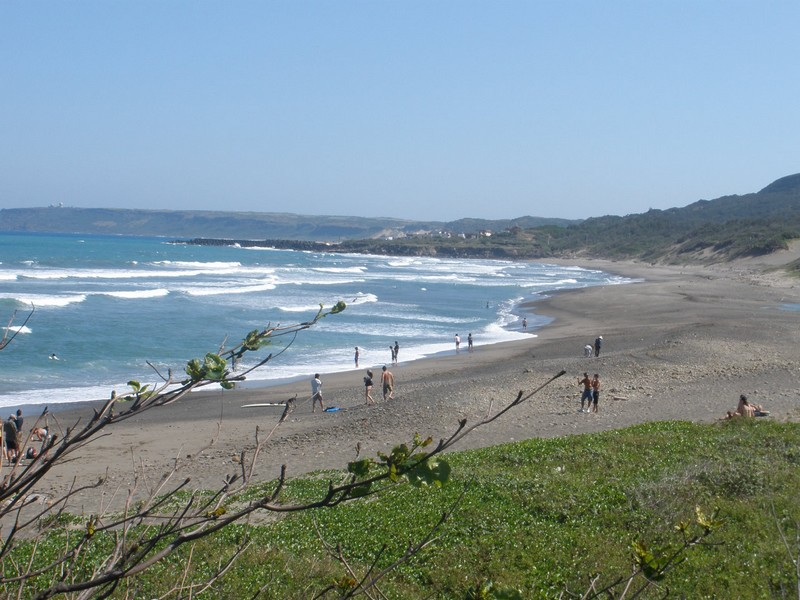
Jialeshui beach in Kenting, the surfer beach

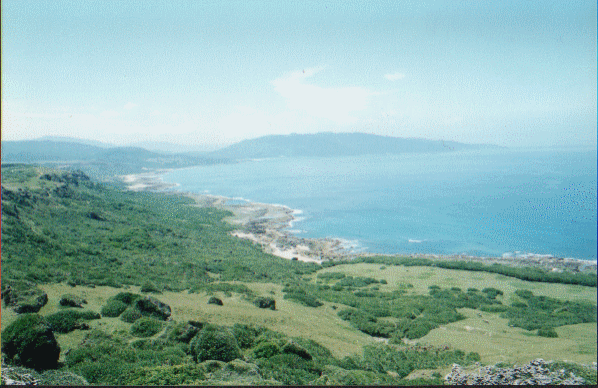
East Coast in Kenting National Park

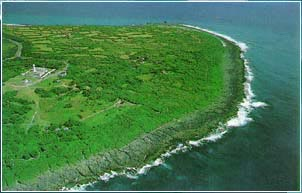
Cape Eluanbi

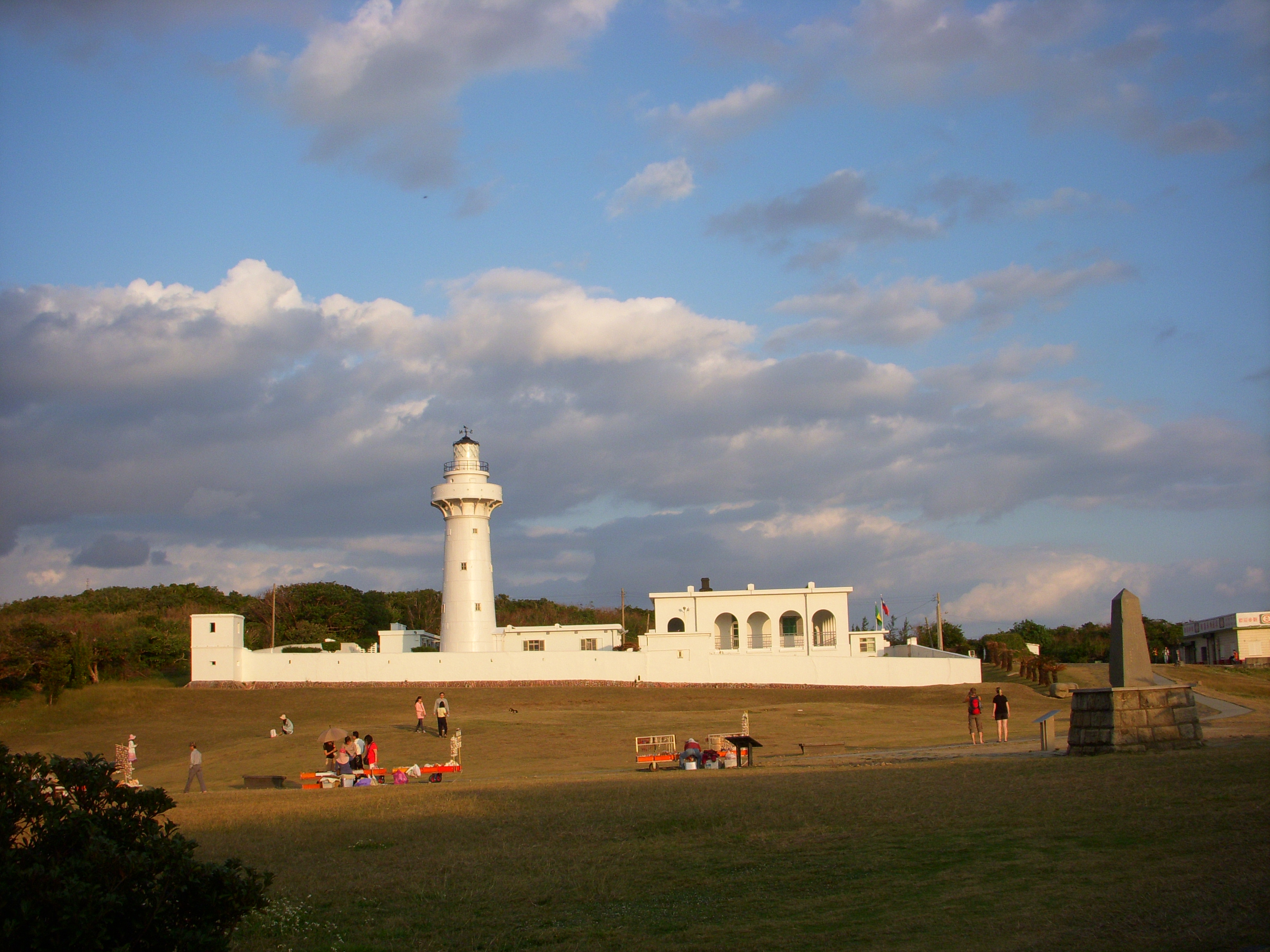
Eluanbi Lighthouse

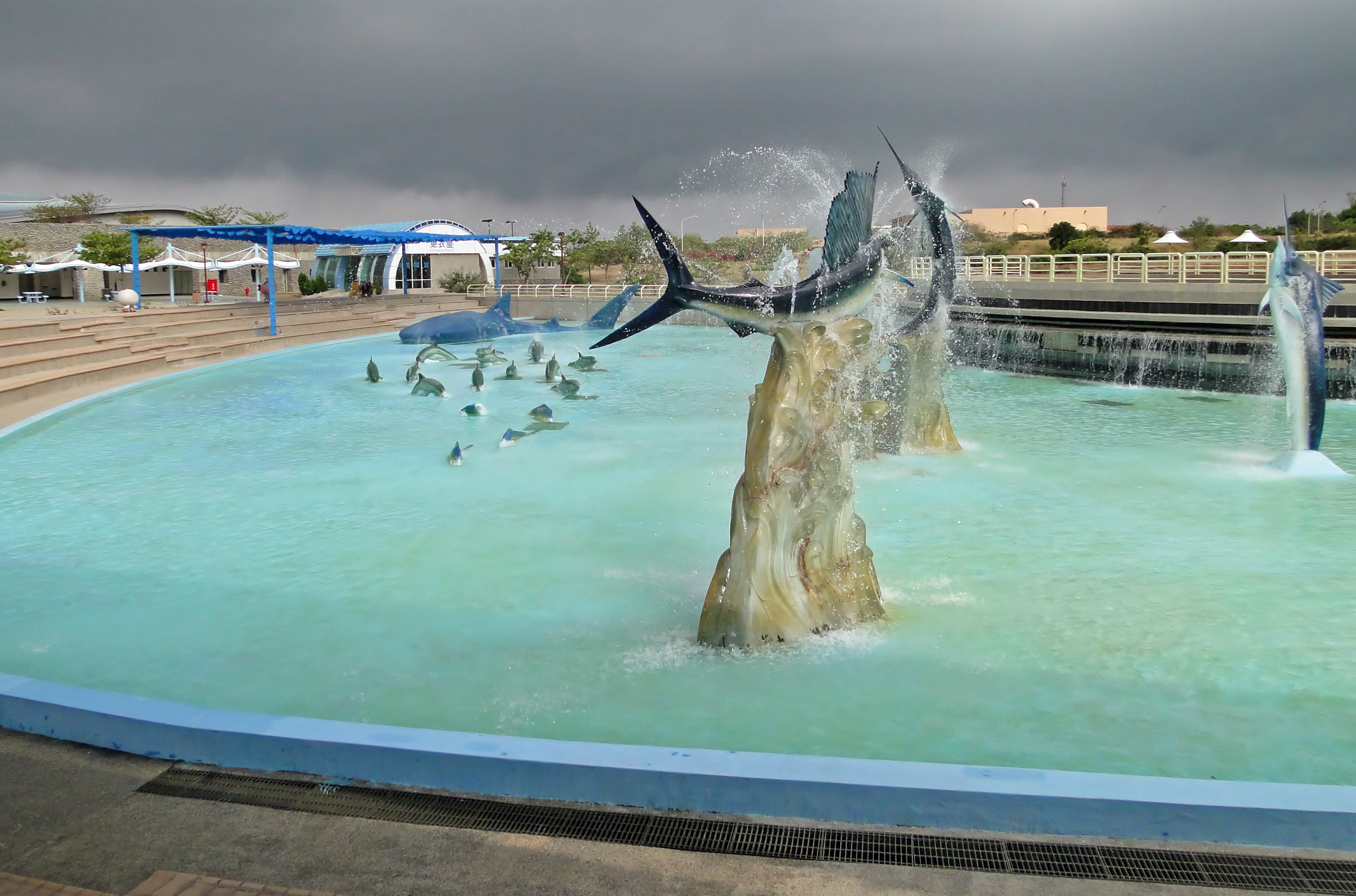
National Museum of Marine Biology and Aquarium

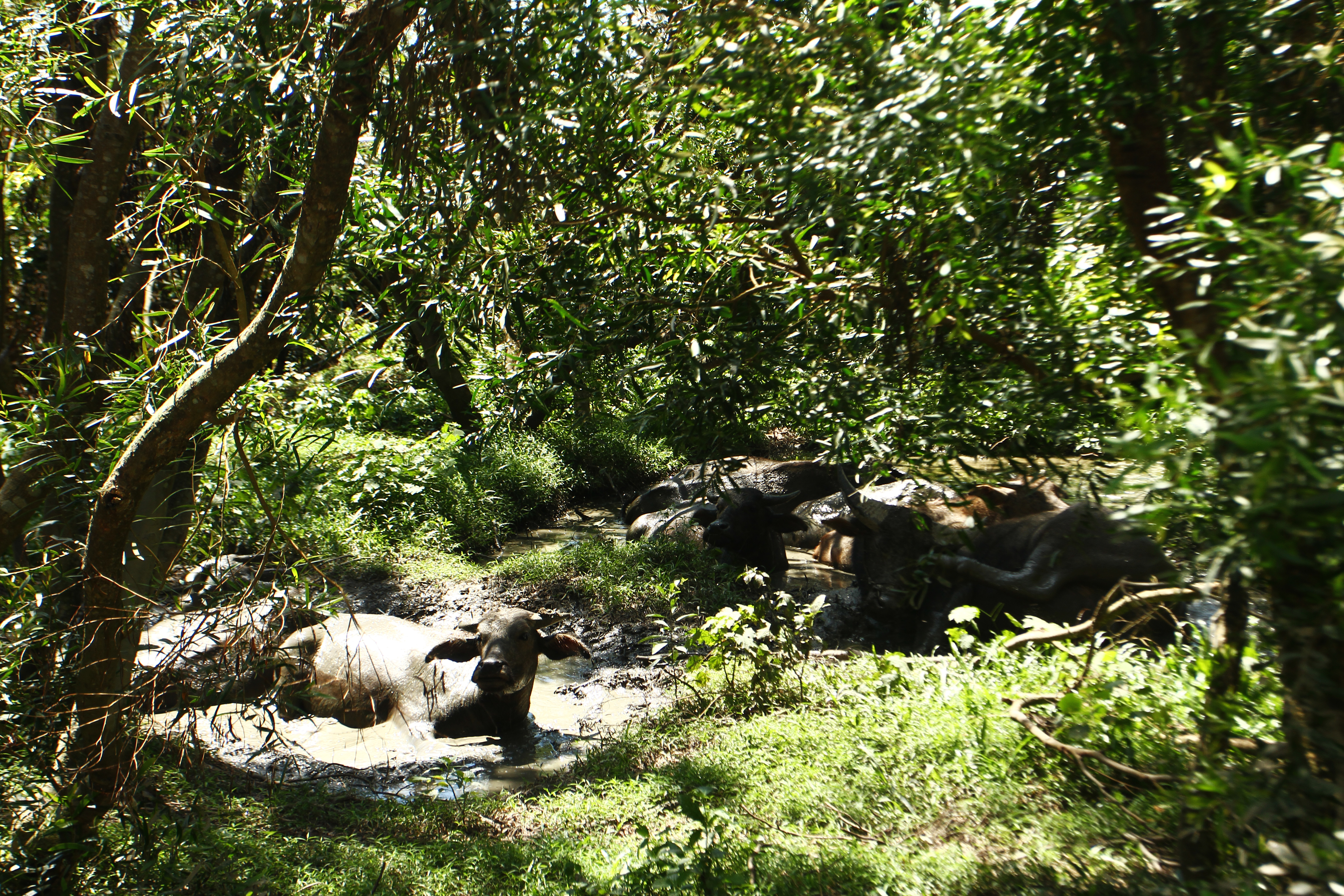
Water Buffaloes

== See also ==
- Amorgos oil spill
- List of national parks in Taiwan
- Rover incident
