= Amorgos oil spill =

2001 oil spill in Taiwan

The Amorgos oil spill began on 14 January 2001 near Kenting National Park, off the southern coast of Taiwan.

Local Taiwanese residents manually collect fuel oil after the "Amorgos" oil spill incident

== Cause ==
On 14 January 2001, the Greek merchant vessel Amorgos, lost power while en route from India to North China. The carrier was transporting approximately 60,000 tons of iron ore and an estimated 1,000 to 1,150 tons of fuel oil when the ship suffered engine failure near Kenting National Park, off the southernmost tip of Taiwan. The crew subsequently abandoned the ship, and all 25 crew members were rescued by the Coast Guard Administration (CGA) of Taiwan. Due to deteriorating weather and sea conditions, the hull of the Amorgos split, and oil began to leak from the vessel beginning 18 January 2001.

== Spillage and ecological effects ==
Approximately 1,300 tons of fuel oil leaked from the Amorgos into the sea surrounding Kenting National Park, causing major damage to the maritime and local environment.

Kenting National Park is an ecological attraction that draws millions of tourists each year due to its warm climate and its many natural phenomena, including limestone caves, monsoon forests and coastal rainforests.

Around 4 to 5 kilometers of the Kenting National Park shoreline was oiled by the spillage, creating a hazardous environment for the 200 bird species and estimated 2,200 plant species within the park. Park officials reported that contaminated coral and dead fish, crabs, shrimp, and clams have washed ashore.

== Delayed response ==
There were many factors that contributed to the delayed response and subsequent clean-up efforts concerning the Amorgos incident.

The spill took place about two months after the Marine Pollution Control Act (MPCA) of Taiwan was publicized. As a result, the spill occurred during a transitional period in which the Ministry of Transportation and Communications (MOTC) and its Salvage Council for Maritime Disasters was delegating its authority to the Environmental Protection Administration (EPA). The jurisdiction among the MOTC, CGA, and the EPA was unclear; therefore, it took longer for the EPA to open an investigation into the spill, allowing more time for the oil to cover a larger area and lay waste to maritime and coastal species.

The second factor was the observance of the Lunar New Year holidays, making it difficult for companies to hire local residents to clean up the mess. After the 5-day holiday, 40 local workers were hired in addition to 8000 soldiers commissioned to take part in the clean-up operations.

The third factor was the severe weather conditions that hampered efforts to clean up the oil. As a result, clean-up was restricted to manual retrieval of oil using buckets, hand nets, and scoops.

== Clean-up timeline ==
Of the 1,300 tons of fuel oil that was spilt, some has been lost due to natural dispersion and evaporation by means of severe weather and rough seas. The oil was later emulsified due to the wave patterns which subsequently increased the area and volume of the spill. Despite these occurrences, most of the oil reached the Lungkeng Ecological Preservation Area within the Kenting National Park.

The affected shoreline consists of fossilized coral and various channels, making access to the oiled areas difficult. As a result, manual collection of oil was the only feasible option. Shoreline clean-up began on 25 January 2001, and lasted until about 14 February 2001, in which an estimated total of 300 tons of oil had been collected.

== Lawsuit and settlement ==
In 2003, the EPA sued Assuranceforeningen Gard—the Norwegian insurer of the Amorgos as a result of the damage caused by the oil spill. Instead, the EPA settled with Assuranceforeningen Gard in March 2006, resulting in the ship's owner agreeing to pay a total of NT$34 million (US$1.05 million).
