= Formosa Expedition =

1867 failed American expedition in Taiwan

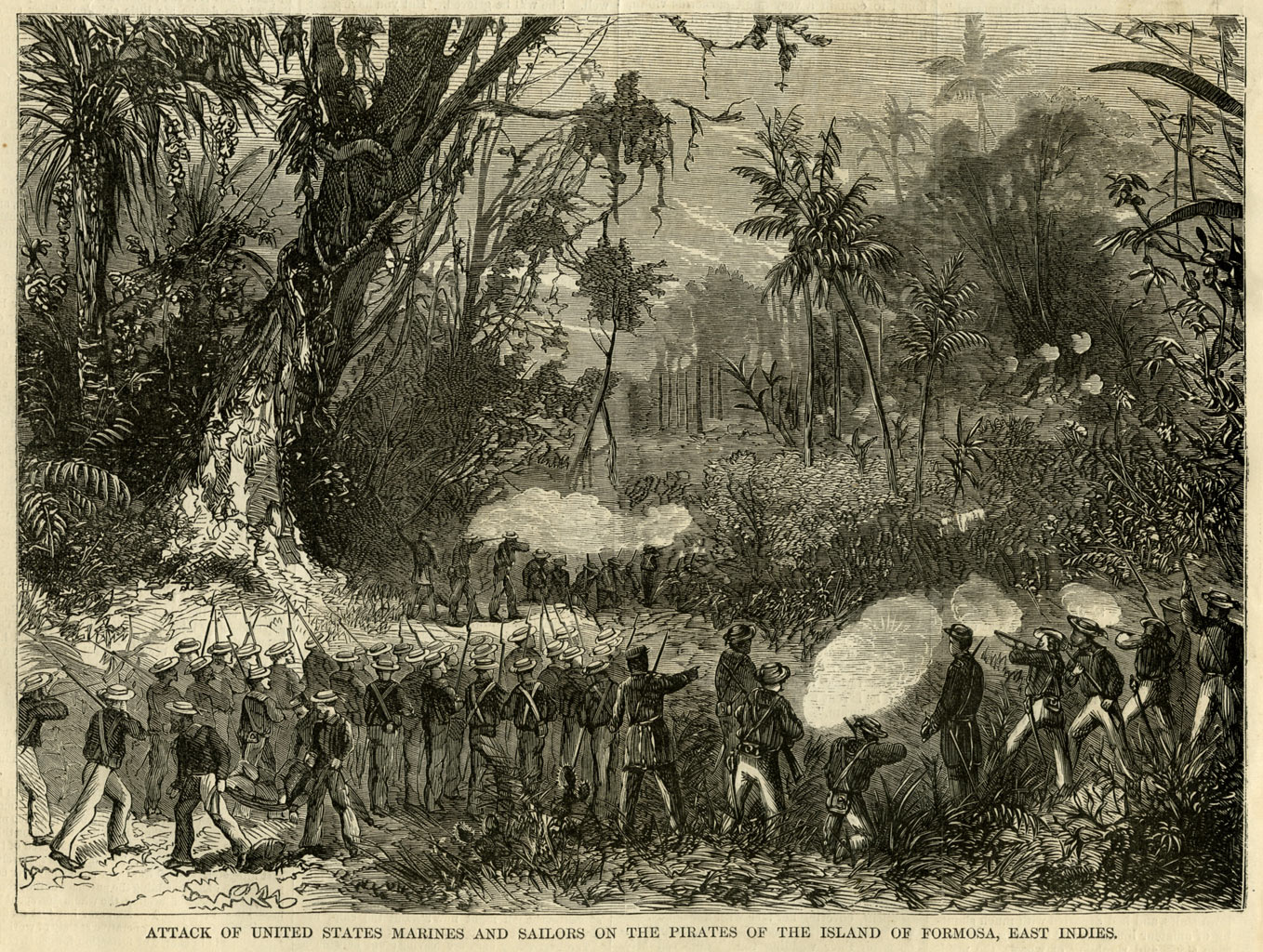
- Attack of United States Marines and Sailors on the pirates of the island of Formosa, East Indies, Harper's Weekly
Date	13 June 1867
Location	Hengchun, Taiwan, Qing China
Result	Paiwan victory

Belligerents
Paiwan	United States

Commanders and leaders
Tok-a-Tok	Henry H. Bell; Alexander Slidell MacKenzie †

Strength
Unknown	181; 2 sloops-of-war

Casualties and losses
Minimal, if any	1 killed Several incapacitated

The Formosa Expedition (Chinese: 美國福爾摩沙遠征; pinyin: Měiguó Fú’ěrmóshā Yuǎnzhēng; Pe̍h-ōe-jī: Bí-kok Hok-nī-mô͘-sa Oán-cheng), or the Taiwan Expedition of 1867, was a punitive expedition launched by the United States against the Paiwan, an indigenous Taiwanese tribe. The expedition was undertaken in retaliation for the Rover incident, in which the Rover, an American bark, was wrecked and its crew killed by Paiwan warriors in March 1867. A United States Navy and Marine company landed in southern Taiwan and attempted to advance into the Paiwan village. The Paiwan responded with guerrilla warfare, repeatedly ambushing, skirmishing, disengaging and retreating. Eventually, the Marines' commander was killed and they retreated to their ship due to fatigue and heat exhaustion, and the Paiwan dispersed and retreated into the jungle. The action is regarded as an American failure.

== Background ==
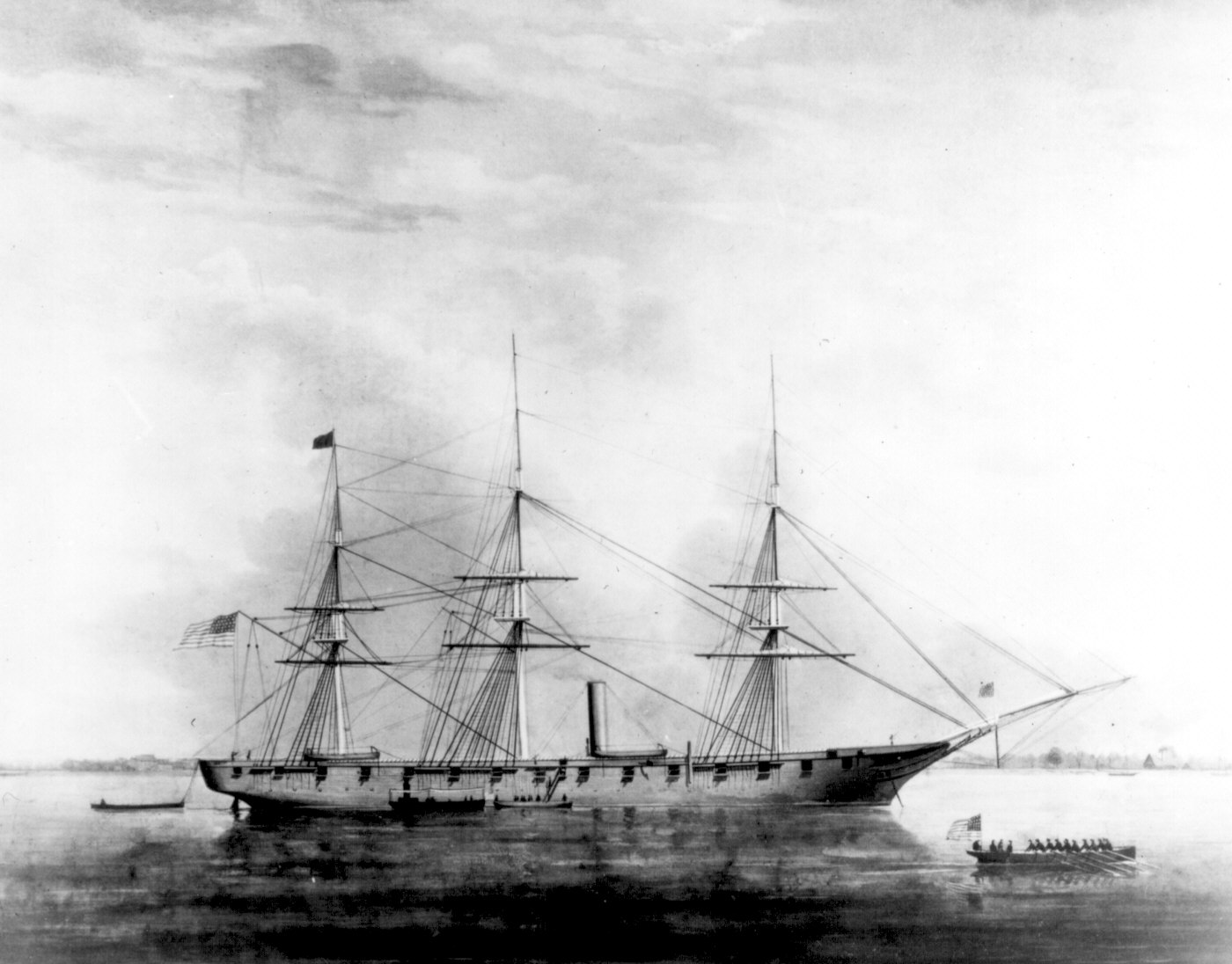
An 1864 painting of Hartford.

On 12 March 1867, the United States merchantman Rover was sailing off Cape Eluanbi, the southernmost point of Taiwan, when she wrecked on an uncharted reef and began drifting out to sea. Her crew of over two dozen safely made it ashore but were attacked and killed by the Paiwan. The Royal Navy ship HMS Cormorant reached the "Koalut country" on 26 March, discovered the fate of the Rover, and informed the American East India Station. Squadron commander Rear Admiral Henry H. Bell ordered Commander John C. Febiger in the newly commissioned gunboat USS Ashuelot to proceed from Fuzhou to the island to investigate the incident.

Upon Febiger's arrival, Qing authorities assured him that the attack was carried out by warriors of a village that did not respect Qing laws. Febiger returned and notified Rear Admiral Bell of this. The American consul to Xiamen, C. W. Le Gendre, had spent April trying to establish communication with the Paiwan, but they remained hostile.

At this point, diplomatic pressure proved a failure. After a delay of three months and "a good deal of red tapeism in Washington", a punitive expedition was decided on. Bell, with the screw sloop-of-war Wyoming and his flagship Hartford, left Shanghai in June for southern Taiwan.

== Expedition ==
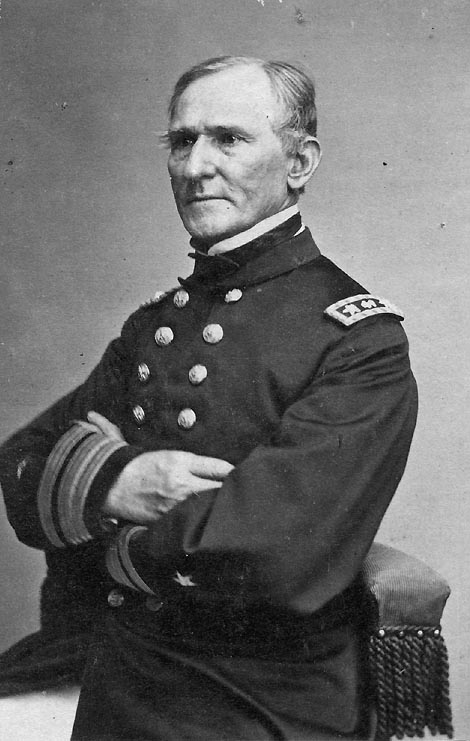
Rear Admiral Henry H. Bell

The passing from Shanghai to Taiwan was uneventful, and the two American warships arriving off the southeastern coast on 13 June 1867. The sloops anchored a half-mile off the shore and made preparations for landing. 181 officers, sailors and Marines landed by boat. They were commanded by Commander George E. Belknap of Hartford and seconded by Lieutenant Commander Alexander Slidell MacKenzie. When on land the company was broken up into two forces, one commanded by Belknap and the other by Mackenzie. Captain James Forney directed the Marines, twenty of whom were deployed as skirmishers in the front of the columns. Their objective was to defeat the Paiwan decisively and to capture their village. Taiwan is a tropical island, hot and humid in the summer, which made the march through the jungle difficult for the Americans, who wore heavy uniforms designed to keep men warm at sea.

After nearly an hour, the Paiwan attacked with muskets from concealed positions on top of a hill directly in front of the American columns. Though the Americans found it difficult to see them, they later reported that the Paiwan warriors wore colorful face paint and were armed with spears as well as firearms. MacKenzie's force engaged first by charging the Paiwan ambush but they fled before the Americans had climbed the hill. The expedition continued further and was ambushed again, so once more the Americans charged and captured the position without inflicting losses on the enemy. As the expedition continued on to the village, the Paiwan ambushed the Americans several times but did not kill any of them.

It was not until the last action that the only American casualty was sustained: the Paiwan warriors fired a musket volley and a ball hit Lieutenant Mackenzie, mortally wounding him. After the volley the Paiwan retreated again but the Americans chose not to pursue. By this time, after six hours of marching, several men had either grown delirious or passed out from the heat, so the expedition returned to the ship.

== Aftermath ==
When they arrived back at shore, the sailors and Marines boarded their ships and then sailed back to mainland China, having failed to complete their objectives. Paiwan casualties were minimal, if any; the Americans found no bodies.

Rear Admiral Bell and other American officers stated in their reports that the only way to make the region safe would be to drive out the Paiwan and put the area under control of a powerful ally. C.W. Le Gendre persuaded the Governor-General of Fujian and Zhejiang to send his own expedition to Taiwan (then a part of Fujian Province). He also requested that Rear Admiral Bell send a gunboat to support the operation but this was denied. Le Gendre took command of the Chinese troops and left Fuzhou for southern Taiwan on 25 July 1867. In September, Le Gendre arrived at the prefectural capital Taiwan (now known as Tainan) to announce the object of his visit and take delivery of the Governor-General's promises of assistance. According to his report, Le Gendre marched to the Paiwan capital and negotiated a Memorandum of the Understanding (南岬之盟) with Chief Tok-a-Tok (c. 1817–1874) (Note: His Paiwan name was written in Chinese characters as 卓杞篤 or 卓其督, both pronounced Tok-ki-tok in Taiwanese. These names were also transcribed into English as Toketok or Tauketok.) to assure the safe conduct of shipwrecked sailors throughout Paiwan territory.

However, indigenous Taiwanese continued to attack wrecked merchant ships. The Mudan Incident of 1871, where 54 shipwrecked Ryūkyūan sailors were captured and beheaded at the southeastern tip of Taiwan, resulted in the Taiwan Expedition of 1874 in which the Japanese military campaigned against the Paiwan. The Japanese succeeded in engaging the Paiwan warriors in battle and received compensation from the Qing government for the massacre.

== See also ==
- Shimonoseki campaign
- 1874 Japanese expedition to Taiwan
- United States expedition to Korea
