= Charles Le Gendre =

French-American diplomat (1830–1899)

Charles William Joseph Émile Le Gendre
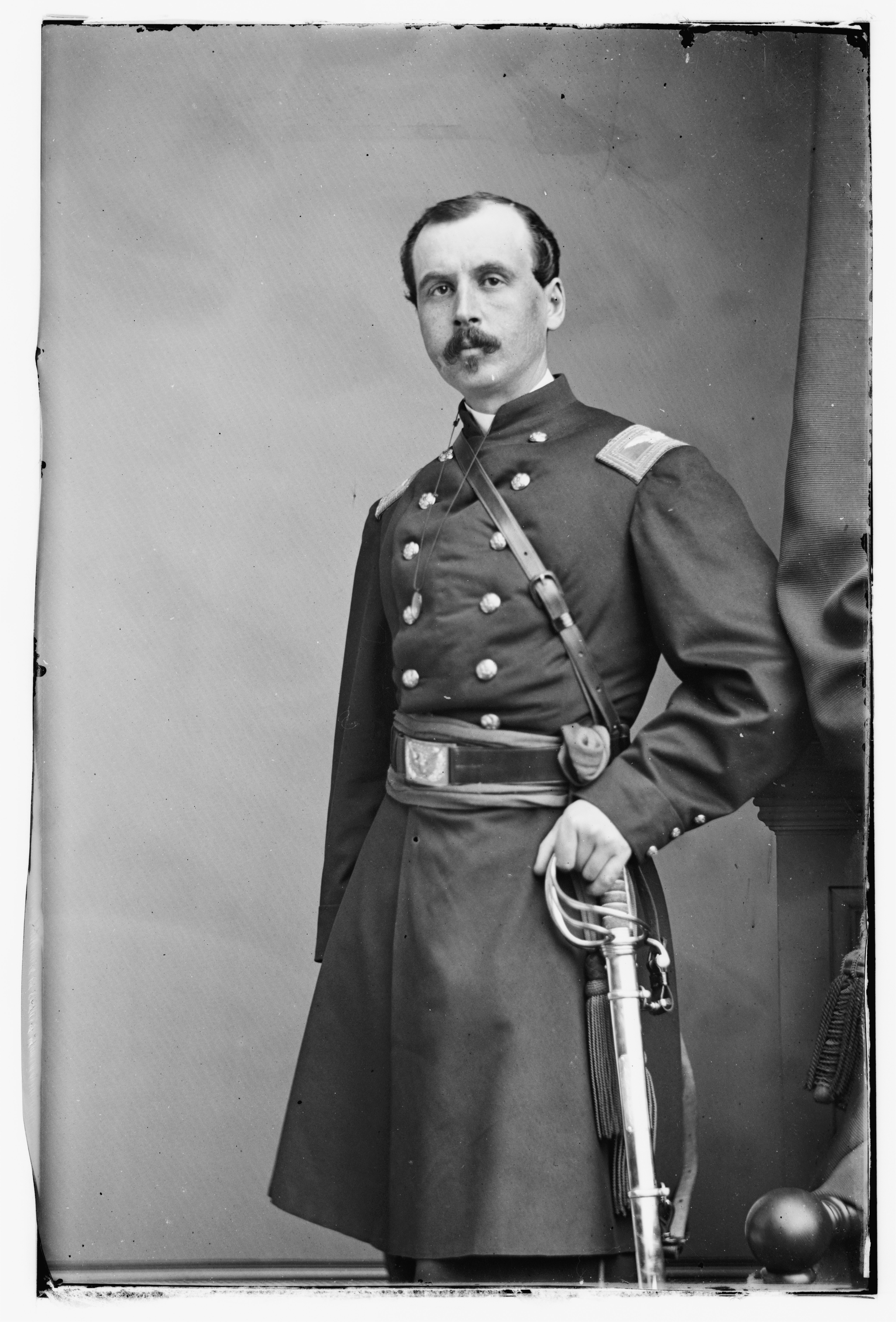
- Born: August 26, 1830; Oullins, France
- Died: September 1, 1899 (aged 69); Seoul, Korea
- Education: Royal College of Reims, University of Paris
- Occupations: Army officer and diplomat
- Spouse(s): Clara Victoria Mulock (Ito Ikeda)

Charles William or Guillaum Joseph Émile Le Gendre (August 26, 1830 – September 1, 1899) was a French-born American officer and diplomat who served as advisor to the Ministry of Foreign Affairs of the Empire of Japan from 1872 to 1875 and as advisor to Emperor Gojong of the Korean Empire from 1890 to 1899.

== Biography ==
=== Early life ===
Le Gendre was born in Oullins, France. He was the son of Jean-François Legendre-Héral, a noteworthy painter, sculptor and professor at the École de Beaux-Arts. Le Gendre was educated at the Royal College of Reims, but he eventually graduated from the University of Paris. At the age of 24, he married Clara Victoria Mulock in Brussels. She was the daughter of a well-known New York lawyer and soon after their marriage Le Gendre moved to the United States and became a naturalized citizen.

=== Civil War military career ===
With the outbreak of the American Civil War in 1861, Le Gendre helped recruit the 51st New York Volunteer Infantry; he was commissioned a major of that regiment on October 29, 1861. Le Gendre participated in combat in North Carolina and was present at the capture of Roanoke Island in 1862. However, he was badly wounded at the Battle of New Bern, North Carolina, on March 14, 1862. As a result of his injuries, Le Gendre lost his left eye, and his nose was shot away at the bridge. He later received a citation for his courage.

Despite his injuries, Le Gendre continued with the Army and was promoted to lieutenant colonel on September 20, 1862. In 1863, he was attached to the IX Corps, with which he fought in numerous campaigns. He was promoted to colonel on March 14, 1863, and assumed command of the 51st Regiment under IX Corps and participated in the siege and capture of Vicksburg. At the Battle of the Wilderness in Virginia on May 6, 1864, while serving under General Ulysses S. Grant, Le Gendre was again severely injured, this time shot in the face with the bullet taking off his nose and left eye. Although still hospitalized in Annapolis, Maryland, he helped organize the city's defenses against the last Confederate raid on the city. He was later transferred to New York, where he helped recruit for the IX Corps. He was honorably discharged on October 4, 1864, and was further given the brevet rank of brigadier general on March 13, 1865.

=== Diplomatic career in China and Taiwan ===
On July 13, 1866, Le Gendre was appointed to be American consul at Xiamen (then known by its Hokkien pronunciation "Amoy") in the Fujian Province of the Qing Empire. He left New York for Liverpool in July 1866 and traveled overland through Europe and Asia, eventually arriving in Xiamen in December 1866. As consul, Le Gendre was in control of five of the Treaty Ports open to foreign commerce in China: Xiamen, Keelung, Taiwan (modern-day Tainan), Tamsui, and Kaohsiung (then known as "Takao"). He worked to suppress the illegal trade in coolies, indentured laborers.

Following the wreck of an American ship Rover on Taiwan Island on March 12, 1867, and the subsequent massacre of the surviving crew by Taiwanese aborigines, Le Gendre traveled to Fuzhou to persuade the Governor General of Fujian and Zhejiang to put pressure on the Chinese authorities in Taiwan to resolve the issue. Instead of taking action, the governor general of Fujian gave Le Gendre permission to go to Taiwan himself, writing a letter of introduction that asked the prefect of Taiwan cooperate. Le Gendre commissioned the United States steamer Ashuelot in order to visit the scene of the wreck and to try to get officials in Taiwan to act. Both this and the subsequent American punitive expedition under Rear Adm. Henry Bell were failures; Le Gendre then returned to Taiwan without any reference to his superiors to gather more information.

Upon return to south China, Le Gendre managed to persuade the governor general in Fuzhou to send a military force to southern Taiwan. The force, significantly smaller than the 400 to 500 soldiers Le Gendre recommended, was dispatched on July 25, 1867. Le Gendre had requested a gunboat from Rear Adm. Bell, which was denied but eventually managed to commission a private warship, the Volunteer. He embarked for Taiwan on September 4, 1867, telling his superiors that he was going purely as a spectator.

Le Gendre quickly assumed de facto command of the mission, which entailed a long and difficult march deep into the mountainous interior of southern Taiwan. Le Gendre negotiated an oral agreement guaranteeing the safety of shipwrecked American and European sailors with the chief of the aboriginal tribes in the area.

On September 6, 1871, a Ryukyuan ship was wrecked off the coast of Taiwan and its surviving crew massacred in a situation similar to that of the Rover. On February 29, 1872, Le Gendre left for Taiwan to attempt to have his treaty extended to cover Japanese sailors as well. The mission was unsuccessful, and caused a falling out between Le Gendre and the US minister to Beijing.

=== Career in Japan and Korea ===
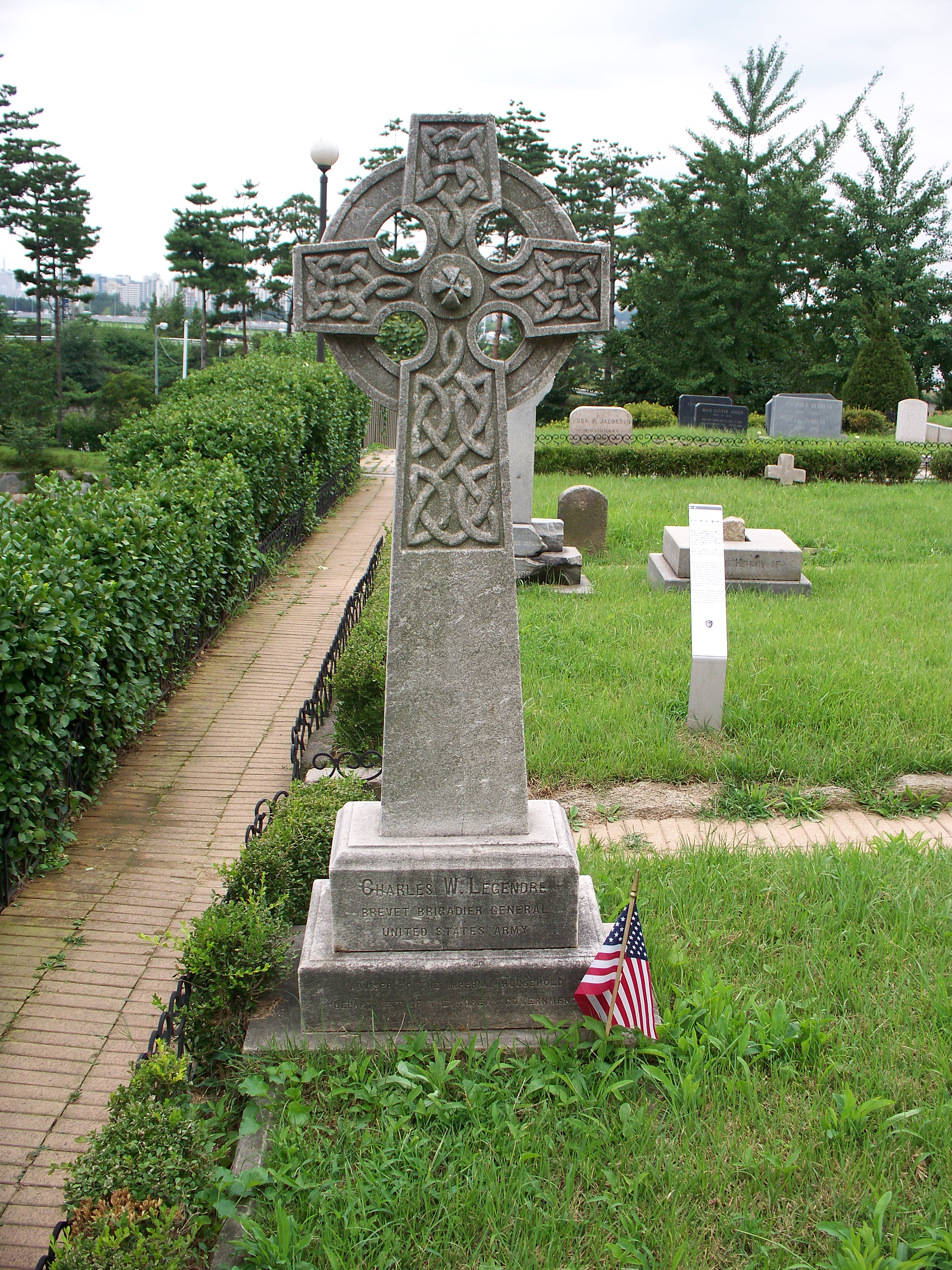
Charles Le Gendre's grave in Seoul, Korea

In December 1872, while traveling from Xiamen back to the United States, Le Gendre stopped off in Japan and was hired by Japanese Foreign Minister Soejima Taneomi as an advisor in both foreign affairs and military affairs, becoming the first foreigner employed in a high-ranking post by the Meiji government.

During his time in Japan, he encouraged the Japanese government to pursue imperial expansion in the region.

Le Gendre participated in the December 1872 diplomatic mission by Soejima to Beijing. After meeting with only partial success in negotiations, Le Gendre helped organize Japan's Taiwan Expedition of 1874, which he intended to personally accompany. However, Le Gendre was unexpectedly imprisoned for a brief time at Shanghai on the orders of the United States Consul-General for deserting the service, and thus never actually made it to Taiwan. In 1875, the Japanese government awarded him the Order of the Rising Sun, Gold and Silver Star, which represents the second highest of eight classes associated with the award. This represented the first time that the Order had been conferred on a non-Japanese recipient. Le Gendre retired later that same year.

Le Gendre remained in Japan until 1890, working in a private capacity as an advisor to Ōkuma Shigenobu. In March 1890 he left Japan to become an adviser to King Gojong of Korea. He remained in the Korean court until his death of apoplexy in Seoul on September 1, 1899. He was buried in the Yanghwajin Foreigners' Cemetery in Seoul.

Le Gendre was author of Progressive Japan: A Study of the Political and Social Needs of the Empire (1878).

A large portion of his private papers are now in the possession of the Library of Congress. Among these are his four-volume Notes of Travel in Formosa (1874–1875), an intelligence report illustrated with photographs and paintings and published only in 2012 by the National Museum of Taiwan History.

=== Family in Japan ===
Never having divorced his American wife, Le Gendre nonetheless married Ito Ikeda in Tokyo sometime in late 1872 or early 1873. Ito Ikeda was the illegitimate daughter of Matsudaira Yoshinaga, a daimyō (大名) regarded as one of the "Four Wise Lords of the Bakumatsu". They had a son and two daughters, only one of whom, Aiko (愛子), survived to adulthood. Their son later became a famous kabuki (歌舞伎) actor, Ichimura Uzaemon XV (十五代目 市村羽左衛門), who died in May 1945, of natural causes. Le Gendre's and Ikeda's granddaughter by Aiko, Seikiya Toshiko (関屋 敏子), was a well-known soprano prior to her suicide in 1941.

== Publications ==
- Les courants humains, ou la circulation du sang de l'homme et de la civilisation à la surface de la terre. 42 vols. Le Gendre papers, Library of Congress, Boxes 6-13.
- Reports on Amoy and the Island of Formosa. Washington: Government Printing Office, 1871.
- How to Deal with China. Amoy, 1871.
- Is Aboriginal Formosa a Part of the Chinese Empire? Shanghai: Lane, Crawford, 1874.
- Progressive Japan: A study of the Political and Social Needs of the Empire. New York and Yokohama: C. Levy, 1878.
- Notes of Travel in Formosa [1867-1875]. Tainan: National Museum of Taiwan History, 2012.

== See also ==
- Li Hongzhang

== External sources ==
- Biography in detail
- Obituary
- Charles LeGendre, American Diplomacy, and Expansionism in Meiji Japan (dissertation)
