= Somers Affair =

Alleged US naval mutiny

The Somers Affair was an incident involving the American brig USS Somers during a training mission in 1842 under Captain Alexander Slidell Mackenzie (1803–1848). Midshipman Philip Spencer (1823–1842) was accused of plotting to overthrow Mackenzie and use the Somers for piracy. Spencer was arrested and executed, along with two other alleged co-conspirators, Samuel Cromwell and Elisha Small, when the ship was just thirteen days away from shore. The three were hanged without a court-martial after the ship's officers agreed with Mackenzie's judgment. The Somers then returned to New York. An official inquiry and a court martial both cleared Mackenzie. There was enormous public attention, most of it unfavorable to Mackenzie, but he remained in the Navy until his death.

The case is particularly notable since Philip Spencer was the son of Secretary of War John C. Spencer.

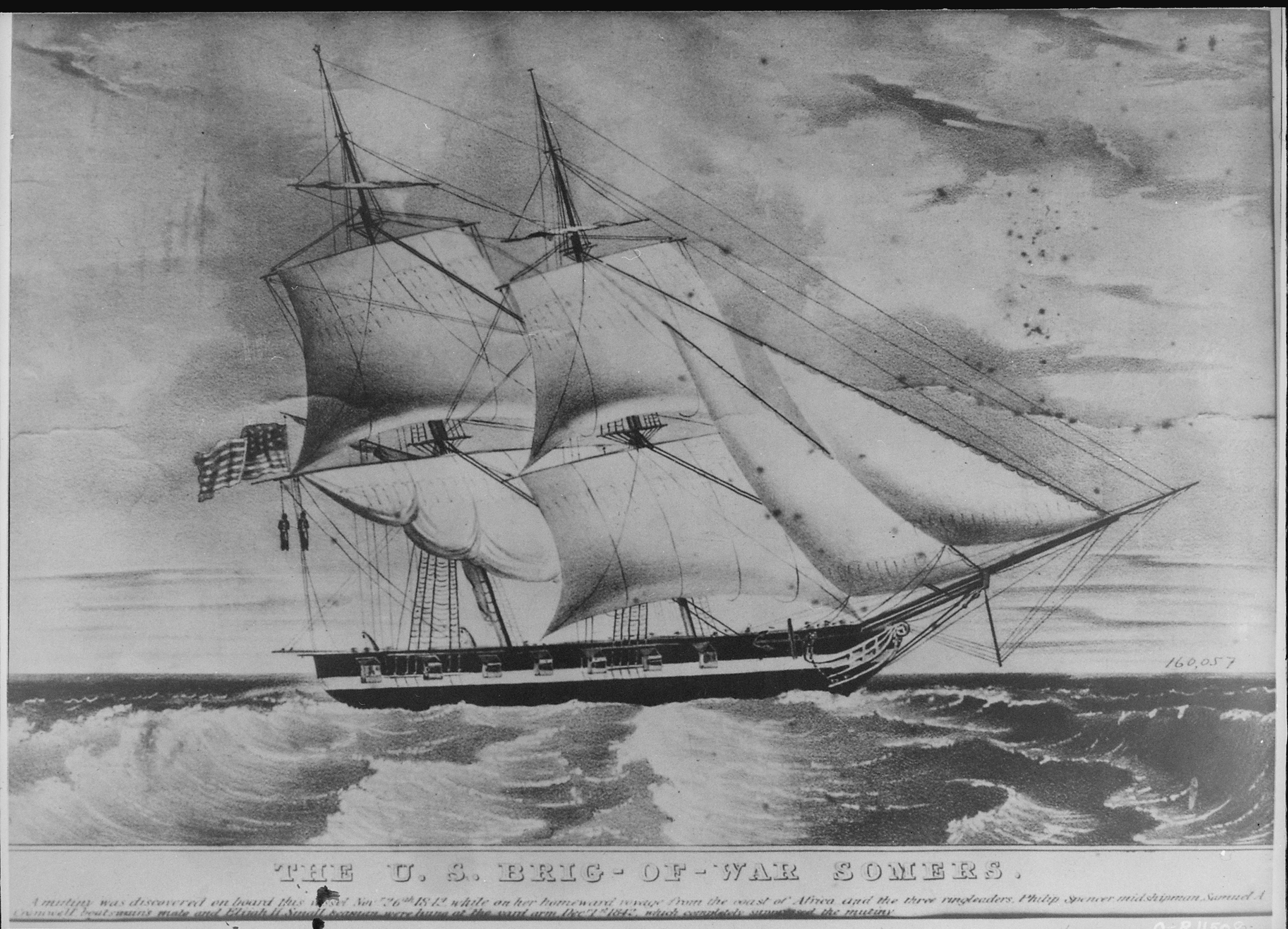
This Lithograph, published circa 1843, shows the mutineers hanging under the US flag.

== Background ==
The brig USS Somers had been newly constructed for a naval "apprentice program" aimed at resolving a serious shortage of manpower for the Navy. It was intended to take children considered “the sweepings of the street,” including orphans and the poor of a nation ravaged by a long economic depression and train them as Navy personnel. This was in keeping with centuries of naval tradition, which held that crew and officers should be trained in their duties while at sea.

Of the 120 crew on board, ninety were in their teens, with half of those between the ages of fourteen and sixteen. Under Captain Mackenzie, they were constantly flogged for "infractions" such as not being fast enough, being "disorderly", not being clean or neat enough, disobeying orders, and masturbating.

Philip Spencer, son of Secretary of War John C. Spencer, was commissioned as one of the Somers's midshipmen after he ran away to work on a whaler at Nantucket following an abortive stay at Union College (where he was a founding member of the Chi Psi fraternity in May 1841). His father located him and convinced him that if a life on the sea was what he wanted, he should live it as "a gentleman"; i.e., as a commissioned officer. Considered "wild and uncontrollable despite displaying signs of high intelligence" during his brief attendance at Geneva College (now Hobart College), his naval career started poorly after he struck a superior officer while serving on the USS North Carolina. Due to his father's influence, he was allowed to resign in disgrace rather than face a court-martial and was quietly reassigned to the Somers.

Spencer proved to be a popular officer, indulging the young sailors in their misbehavior and giving them gifts of money, tobacco, and alcohol. Captain Mackenzie and the other officers, by contrast, held him in contempt for modeling poor behavior to the crew, thus impeding the primary mission of the Somers's voyage.

== Incident ==
On 26 November, Captain Mackenzie was informed by his first lieutenant, Guert Gansevoort, that the Somers's purser, H.M. Heiskell, had learned from ship's steward J.W. Wales that a mutiny was being planned by Spencer. Captain Mackenzie instructed Gansevoort to watch Spencer and the crew for evidence of the suspected mutiny. The lieutenant later reported to Mackenzie that Spencer had been observed taking part in secret nightly conferences with Seaman Elisha Small and Boatswain's Mate Samuel Cromwell.

Captain Mackenzie confronted Spencer with the mutiny allegation that evening. Spencer's reply was that he and Wales were merely joking, but this only further angered the captain. He ordered that Spencer be clapped in irons and held on the quarterdeck while his locker was searched. Papers written in English, but using Greek letters, were found; they were promptly translated by Midshipman Henry Rodgers.

== Spencer's secret note ==
"CERTAIN: P. Spencer, E. Andrews, D. McKinley, Wales
"DOUBTFUL: Wilson (X), McKee (X), Warner, Green, Gedney, Van Veltzor, Sullivan, Godfrey, Gallia (X), Howard (X)
"Those doubtful marked (X) will probably be induced to join before the project is carried into execution. The remainder of the doubtful will probably join when the thing is done, if not, they must be forced. If any not marked down wish to join after the thing is done we will pick out the best and dispose of the rest.
"NOLENS VOLENS: Sibley, Van Brunt, Blackwell, Clarke, Corney, Garratrantz, Strummond, Witmore, Waltham, Nevilles, Dickinson, Riley, Scott, Crawley, Rodman, Selsor, The Doctor
"Wheel: McKee
"Cabin: Spencer, Small, Wilson
"Wardroom: Spencer
"Steerage: Spencer, Small, Wilson
"Arm Chest: McKinley"

As evidence of a conspiracy, however, the document had several problems. For starters, nobody named “E. Andrews” was aboard the Somers. Cromwell, a leading suspect, was not listed, while Wales — the man who had brought the story to his superiors’ attention — was listed as a “certain” conspirator.

A mast failed and damaged some sail rigging on 27 November. The timing and circumstances were regarded as suspicious by Captain Mackenzie, and Cromwell, the largest man on the crew, was questioned about his alleged meetings with Spencer. Cromwell said: "It was not me, sir – it was Small." Small was questioned and admitted that he and Spencer had met in secret. Both Cromwell and Small joined Spencer in being restrained on the quarterdeck. On 28 November, the wardroom steward, Henry Waltham, was flogged for having stolen brandy for Spencer; Captain Mackenzie then summoned the crew and revealed what he claimed was a plot by Spencer to have them murdered. Waltham was flogged again on 29 November for asking a sailor to steal three bottles of wine. Sailmaker's Mate Charles A. Wilson was caught attempting to break into the ship's armory that afternoon, and two crewmen, McKinley and Green, missed muster when their watch was called at midnight.

== Execution ==
Four more men were restrained on the morning of 30 November: Wilson, McKinley, Green, and Cromwell's friend, Alexander McKie. Captain Mackenzie then consulted with the four wardroom officers (First Lieutenant Gansevoort, Passed Assistant Surgeon L.W. Leecock, Purser Heiskell, and Acting Sailing Master M.C. Perry) and three oldest midshipmen (Henry Rodgers, Egbert Thompson, and Charles W. Hayes), asking their opinion as to the best course of action. The seven convened in the wardroom to interview members of the crew.

On 1 December, the officers reported that they had "come to a cool, decided, and unanimous opinion" that Spencer, Cromwell, and Small were "guilty of a full and determined intention to commit a mutiny;" and recommended that the three be summarily executed. Spencer further stated that the accused conspirators "had been pretending piracy". Different accounts state that the captain “badgered” the officers to quickly convict the accused. The three men were hanged that day and buried at sea. In response to others stating that they were only thirteen days to home port and could have just waited to try them at shore, the captain noted the fatigue of his officers, the smallness of the vessel, and the inadequacies of the shipboard confinement to justify the executions.

== Aftermath ==
Somers docked at St. Thomas for resupply on 5 December and returned to New York on 14 December. She remained there during a naval court of inquiry which investigated the alleged mutiny and subsequent executions. The court exonerated Mackenzie, as did a subsequent court-martial, held at his request to avoid a trial in civil court. Nevertheless, the general populace remained skeptical. President John Tyler respected the verdict, but ordered that Mackenzie's record state that he was not "honorably acquitted", but that instead the allegations were "not proven."

No charges were brought against the other alleged mutineers, who were quietly released. Mackenzie remained on active service until his death from heart disease several years later, while Lt. Gansevoort became a captain in his own right and was promoted to the rank of Commodore during the Mexican American War. Thirty-five of the new apprentices later deserted the Somers while she was in port, and the apprentice system, which the brig was intended to establish, was abandoned. Instead, the United States Naval Academy was founded in 1845 to oversee the training of new personnel.
