= USS MacKenzie =

USS MacKenzie may refer to the following ships of the United States Navy:

- USS MacKenzie (TB-17), was the lead ship of MacKenzie-class torpedo boats, commissioned in 1899 and struck in 1916
- USS MacKenzie (DD-175), was a Wickes-class destroyer commissioned in 1919, decommissioned and turned over to the Royal Canadian Navy in 1940 and recommissioned HMCS Annapolis. The ex-MacKenzie was struck from the US Naval list in 1941
- USS MacKenzie (DD-614), was a Benson-class destroyer, commissioned in 1942 and struck in 1971
- USS George K. MacKenzie (DD-836), was a Gearing-class destroyer commissioned in 1945 and struck in 1976
