= Guert Gansevoort =

19th century United States Navy officer

- Born: June 7, 1812; Gansevoort, New York
- Died: July 15, 1868 (aged 56); Schenectady, New York
- Military career
- Allegiance: United States of America
- Branch: United States Navy
- Service years: 1823–1867
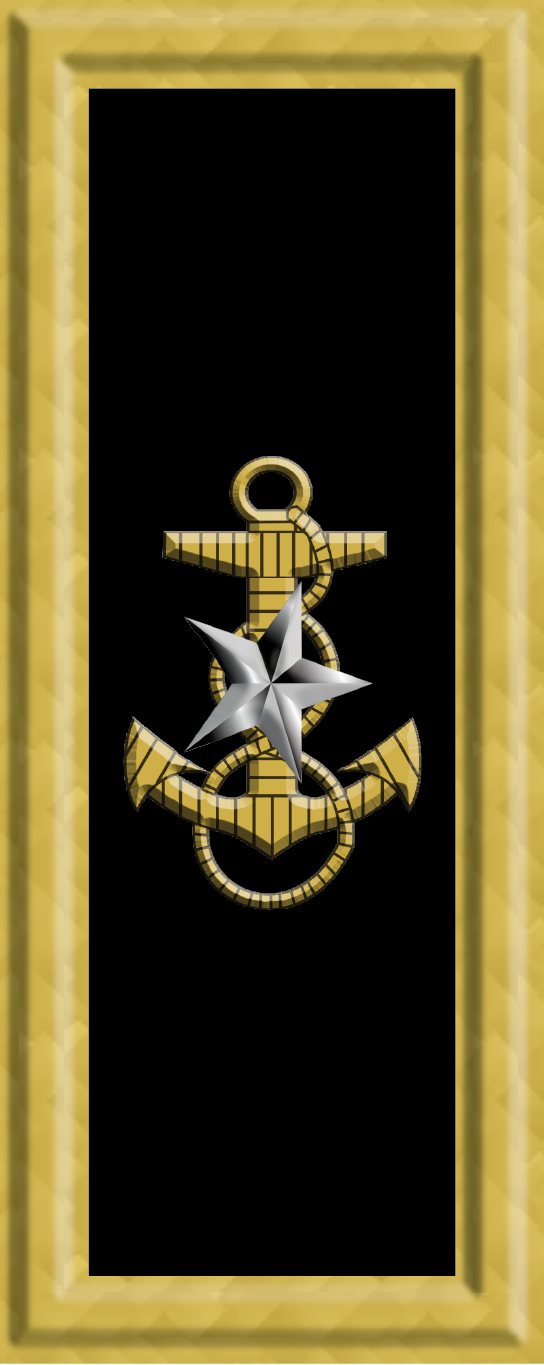
- Rank: Commodore
- Commands: USS Decatur; USS Roanoke
- Conflicts: Mexican–American War; Puget Sound War; American Civil War

Commodore Guert Gansevoort (7 June 1812 – 15 July 1868) was an officer in the United States Navy during the Mexican–American War and the American Civil War.

== Biography ==
He was born into an aristocratic Dutch American family in Gansevoort, New York, near Albany. The area was named for his paternal grandfather, Peter Gansevoort, a prosperous businessman who had served in the Continental Army and later become a brigadier general in the United States Army. Guert was the son of Peter's son Leonard. Peter's daughter, Maria, was the mother of author Herman Melville.

Gansevoort was appointed a midshipman in the Navy on 4 March 1823. Subsequently, he served in the Mediterranean Sea on board Constitution, North Carolina, and Ohio, receiving promotion to passed midshipman on 28 April 1832, and to lieutenant on 8 March 1837.

In 1842 Gansevoort was serving as first lieutenant aboard the brig Somers, under the command of Alexander Slidell Mackenzie, when a planned mutiny was discovered, led by Midshipman Philip Spencer. On the advice of Gansevoort and the other officers Mackenzie sentenced Spencer, Boatswain's Mate Samuel Cromwell and Seaman Elisha Small to death, and on 1 December the three men were hanged from the yardarm. Mackenzie was subsequently court-martialled, but exonerated. Gansevoort's first cousin, Herman Melville, later wrote the novella Billy Budd, inspired by the events.

Gansevoort took part in the First Battle of Tuxpan and First Battle of Tabasco during the Mexican–American War. Promoted to commander on 14 September 1855, Gansevoort landed seamen and marines from Decatur in January 1856 to defend Seattle, Washington Territory from Native Americans during the Puget Sound War.

Between 1861 and 1863, during the Civil War, Gansevoort was in charge of ordnance at the Brooklyn Navy Yard, receiving promotion to captain on 16 July 1862, while helping fit out ships which had been acquired for blockade duty. He commanded the ironclad Roanoke in the last year of the war.

Gansevoort retired on 28 January 1867, and was promoted to commodore on the retired list. He died on 15 July 1868 at Schenectady, New York.

== Namesake ==
The destroyer USS Gansevoort (DD-608) (1942–1946) was named for him.
