= List of Chi Psi chapters =

Chi Psi is an American collegiate fraternity. It was established 1841 at Union College in Schenectady, New York. Its chapters are known as Alphas. In the following list, active chapters are indicated in bold and inactive chapters are in italics.

Chapter	Charter date and range	Institution	Location	Status	Ref.
**Pi**	May 20, 1841 – 1878; 1892–200x ?; 2008	Union College	Schenectady, New York	Active	
Theta	1842–1872, 1875–1963	Williams College	Williamstown, Massachusetts	Inactive	(Note: Chapter formed by absorbing Chi Omega, which was established in 1841.)
Mu	1843–1994	Middlebury College	Middlebury, Vermont	Inactive	
Alpha	1844–1861, 1876–2000, 2013–2023	Wesleyan University	Middletown, Connecticut	Inactive	
Eta	1844–1855, 1863–1869, 1918–1993	Bowdoin College	Brunswick, Maine	Inactive	(Note: Chapter reformed in 1918 by absorbing Phi Theta Psi (local), which was established in 1915.)
**Phi**	1845	Hamilton College	Clinton, New York	Active	
**Epsilon**	1845–2016, 2022	University of Michigan	Ann Arbor, Michigan	Active	
Zeta	1846–1858, 1882–1885	Columbia University	New York City, New York	Inactive	
Delta	1851–1857	Princeton University	Princeton, New Jersey	Inactive	
**Sigma**	1855–1861, 1928	University of North Carolina at Chapel Hill	Chapel Hill, North Carolina	Active	(Note: Reformed in 1928 by absorbing Alpha Chi, which was established in 1923.)
Kappa	1857–1873	College of the City of New York	New York City, New York	Inactive	
**Beta**	1858–1861, 1867–1875, 1883–1897, 1957	University of South Carolina	Columbia, South Carolina	Active	
**Gamma**	1858–1861, 1869–1895,1970–2007, 2015	University of Mississippi	Oxford, Mississippi	Active	(Note: Chapter formed by absorbing Kappa Alpha, which was established in 1855.)
**Upsilon**	1858–1861, 1870–1898, 2025	Furman University	Greenville, South Carolina	Active	
Lambda	1860–1870	Brown University	Providence, Rhode Island	Inactive	
**Omicron**	1860–1870, 1919–2008, 2016	University of Virginia	Charlottesville, Virginia	Active	
Chi	1864–1908, 1985–2017	Amherst College	Amherst, Massachusetts	Inactive	
Tau	1869–1909	Wofford College	Spartanburg, South Carolina	Inactive	
**Psi**	1869–1875, 1885–2014, 2017	Cornell University	Ithaca, New York	Active	
**Nu**	1874	University of Minnesota	Minneapolis and Saint Paul, Minnesota	Active	
**Iota**	1878	University of Wisconsin–Madison	Madison, Wisconsin	Active	
**Rho**	1879–1999, 2005	Rutgers University–New Brunswick	New Brunswick, New Jersey	Active	(Note: Chapter formed by absorbing Alpha Theta, which was established in 1877. Reformed as a colony in 2002.)
**Xi**	1883	Stevens Institute of Technology	Hoboken, New Jersey	Active	(Note: Chapter formed by absorbing the local Alpha Psi.)
Omega	1884–1889	University of Rochester	Rochester, New York	Inactive	
**Alpha Delta**	1890–2009, 2011	University of Georgia	Athens, Georgia	Active	
**Beta Delta**	1894	Lehigh University	Bethlehem, Pennsylvania	Inactive	
Gamma Delta	1895–1971	Stanford University	Stanford, California	Inactive	
Delta Delta	1895–2024	University of California-Berkeley	Berkeley, California	Inactive	
Epsilon Delta prime	1898–1942	University of Chicago	Chicago, Illinois	Inactive, Reassigned	(Note: Chapter was formed by absorbing the local Q. V. Society, which was established in 1895.)
**Zeta Delta**	1912	University of Illinois Urbana-Champaign	Champaign and Urbana, Illinois	Active	(Note: Chapter was established by absorbing Tau Lambda, which was established in 1906. Also absorbed Chi Beta in 1940.)
**Psi Delta**	1920–2004, 2011	University of Colorado Boulder	Boulder, Colorado	Active	(Note: Chapter formed by absorbing the local group, Gargoyle Club, which was established in 1920.)
**Eta Delta**	1921	University of Oregon	Eugene, Oregon	Active	(Note: Chapter formed by absorbing the local club, S. Marelda, which was established in 1919. Also absorbed Becheldorn in 1925.)
**Theta Delta**	1921	University of Washington	Seattle, Washington	Active	(Note: Chapter formed by absorbing Theta Gamma Pi, which was established in 1920.)
**Iota Delta**	1923	Georgia Tech	Atlanta, Georgia	Active	(Note: Chapter formed by absorbing Delta Kappa Chi, which was established in 1921.)
**Kappa Delta**	1924–1963, 2013	Yale University	New Haven, Connecticut	Active	
Epsilon Delta second	1946–2012	Northwestern University	Evanston, Illinois	Inactive	(Note: Chapter formed by absorbing Alpha Epsilon Delta, which was established in 1946.)
Lambda Delta prime	1949–1952	University of California, Los Angeles	Los Angeles, California	Inactive	(Note: Chapter formed by absorbing Alpha Epsilon Delta, which was established in 1947.)
**Tau Delta**	1964	Sewanee: The University of the South	Sewanee, Tennessee	Active	
Lambda Delta second	1967–1993	University of California, Irvine	Irvine, California	Inactive	(Note: Chapter formed by absorbing the local 1841 Club, which was established in 1966.)
**Chi Delta**	1972	Clemson University	Clemson, South Carolina	Active	(Note: Chapter formed by absorbing Beta Sigma Chi, which was established in 1933.)
**Omicron Delta**	1977	Washington and Lee University	Lexington, Virginia	Active	
**Mu Delta**	1977	Rollins College	Winter Park, Florida	Active	(Note: Chapter formed by absorbing the local group, Lambdas, which was established in the 1970s.)
**Xi Delta**	1983–1995, 2000	Texas Tech University	Lubbock, Texas	Active	(Note: Chapter formed by absorbing the Lodge Club, which was established in 1981. It reformed as a colony in 1997.)
**Upsilon Delta**	1986	Wake Forest University	Winston-Salem, North Carolina	Active	
**Sigma Delta**	1989	Duke University	Durham, North Carolina	Active	
Nu Delta	1997–2004	Pennsylvania State University	University Park, Pennsylvania	Inactive	(Note: Formed by absorbing Alpha Chi Sigma, which was established in 1911.)
**Pi Delta**	2001	North Carolina State University	Raleigh, North Carolina	Active	
**Omega Delta**	2003	George Mason University	Fairfax, Virginia	Active	
**Rho Delta**	2005	Miami University	Oxford, Ohio	Active	
**Phi Delta**	2016	University of Kentucky	Lexington, Kentucky	Active	
**Epsilon Tau**	2023	Purdue University	West Lafayette, Indiana	Active	
**Pi Tau**	2023	South Dakota School of Mines and Technology	Rapid City, South Dakota	Active	
**Alpha Nu Tau**	2024	Florida State University	Tallahassee, Florida	Active	
