= Alexander Slidell Mackenzie =

United States Navy officer (1803–1848)

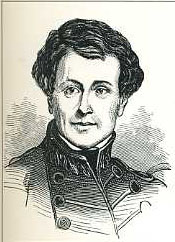
- Born: Alexander Slidell; April 6, 1803; New York City, New York
- Died: September 13, 1848 (aged 45); Scarborough, New York
- Relatives: John Slidell (brother); Matthew C. Perry (brother-in-law); Ranald Slidell Mackenzie (son); Alexander Slidell MacKenzie (son)
- Military career
- Allegiance: United States of America
- Branch: United States Navy
- Service years: 1815–1848
- Rank: Commander
- Commands: USS Somers
- Other work: Author, naval historian

Alexander Slidell Mackenzie (April 6, 1803 – September 13, 1848), born Alexander Slidell, was a United States Navy officer, famous for his 1842 decision to execute three suspected mutineers aboard a ship under his command USS Somers in the Somers Mutiny. Mackenzie was also an accomplished man of letters, producing several volumes of travel writing and biographies of early important US naval figures, some of whom he knew personally.

Mackenzie was the brother of Senator John Slidell of Louisiana, who was later involved in the American Civil War's Trent Affair.

Mackenzie was the captain of USS Somers when it became the only US Navy ship to undergo a mutiny, which led to executions, including Philip Spencer, the 19-year-old son of the Secretary of War John C. Spencer.

Mackenzie's handling of the Somers Mutiny, including its lack of a lawful court martial, was highly controversial and public opinion ran against him. The mutiny proved the need for systematic training of cadets before they went to sea. In 1845, Secretary of the Navy George Bancroft seized on the Somers affair as a reason to establish the United States Naval Academy.

== Early life ==
Mackenzie (then Slidell) was born April 6, 1803, in New York City, to Margery (also spelled Marjorie) (née Mackenzie) and John Slidell. Alexander was one of a large family of children. His older siblings included: Thomas Slidell, chief justice of Louisiana's state Supreme court; John Slidell, US Senator from Louisiana; and Jane Slidell, who married Commodore Matthew C. Perry. Jane's marriage to Perry was to have a particularly profound influence on her younger brother's life, bringing him into close contact with one of the nation's leading naval families, which included Matthew's heroic older brother, Commodore Oliver Hazard Perry, and members of Commodore John Rodgers' family, with whom the Perrys intermarried.

In 1837–1838, Alexander Slidell petitioned the New York State legislature and obtained the right to change his name to Mackenzie, reputedly as a condition of claiming the inheritance of a maternal uncle.

== Naval service ==
Mackenzie entered the U.S. Navy as a midshipman in 1815. A contemporary of Henry Wadsworth Longfellow and a personal friend of Washington Irving, he published a number of books, including A Year in Spain, Life of John Paul Jones, Life of Commodore Stephen Decatur, and Life of Commodore Oliver Hazard Perry (his late brother-in-law). He was promoted to lieutenant on January 13, 1825, and to commander on September 8, 1841.

USS Somers was launched by the New York Navy Yard on April 16, 1842, and was commissioned on 12 May 1842, with Mackenzie in command. After completing a shakedown cruise to Puerto Rico and back, the new brig sailed out of New York Harbor on September 13, 1842, with orders to head for the Atlantic coast of Africa with dispatches for the sloop USS Vandalia. Somers was also acting as an experimental schoolship for naval apprentices on this voyage; the Somers crew was mostly inexperienced sailors and seamen.

After looking for Vandalia at Madeira, Tenerife, and Porto Praia, Somers arrived at Monrovia, Liberia, on November 10, only to discover that the sloop had already sailed for home. The next day, Mackenzie set sail for the Virgin Islands hoping to meet up with Vandalia at St. Thomas before the return journey back to New York.

=== Somers mutiny ===
On the passage to West Africa, some of the Somers officers noticed a steady worsening of morale among the crew. On the way home on November 26, 1842, Mackenzie learned of a plot and arrested Midshipman Philip Spencer, the 19-year-old son of Secretary of War John Canfield Spencer, for inciting mutiny. The other two young plotters arrested with Spencer were Elisha Small and Samuel Cromwell. Mackenzie was not legally empowered to convene a court martial. So he charged his officers with making an investigation. They unanimously concluded that the three sailors were guilty and recommended their immediate execution, which took place at sea on December 1, 1842. Only 13 days later, Somers arrived in New York, where a naval court of inquiry was immediately ordered to investigate the affair.

Mackenzie was completely exonerated at the court of inquiry and at a subsequent court martial. However the controversial incident drew nationwide attention and colored the remainder of his life. It was customary then to commend officers cleared at a court martial, but Mackenzie's court martial made very clear that it was not commending him. The entire affair resulted in a great sensation, and Mackenzie's conduct was as severely criticized by his opponents as it was ardently defended by his supporters. His fiercest detractor was the famous novelist and naval historian James Fenimore Cooper.

=== Naval historian and author ===
Mackenzie was also an accomplished author and naval historian. While his tours of duty in the navy were broadening, he also used several extended leaves to travel in Europe, where he mingled with other literary Americans including Henry Wadsworth Longfellow and fellow New Yorker Washington Irving, a lifelong friend. Mackenzie's first work, A Year in Spain, by a Young American (1829), made him known in America as well as in England. Other works followed: Popular Essays on Naval Subjects (1833), The American in England (1835), Spain Revisited (1836), Life of John Paul Jones (1841), Life of Commodore Oliver H. Perry (1841), and Life of Commodore Stephen Decatur (1846).

Mackenzie also wrote a manuscript, A Journal of a Tour in Ireland, The Case of the 'Seiners'; "Defence of A. S. Mackenzie", 1843.

== Personal life ==
Mackenzie married Catherine Alexander Robinson (b. 1814), eldest daughter of Morris Robinson, a founder of the Mutual Life Insurance Company of New York. Together, they were the parents of: General Ranald Slidell Mackenzie, who, after a successful Civil War career, commanded the 4th Cavalry Regiment (United States), securing the line of settlement in Texas and throughout the West. Ranald Mackenzie was arguably the best Indian fighter of the American West. Another son was Lieutenant Commander Alexander Slidell MacKenzie.

According to a letter written by Captain D.W. Knox, USN (ret.) on July 1, 1938, in response to a query to the Department of the Navy, "Commander MacKenzie died suddenly September 13, 1848, at his residence, near Tarrytown, N.Y., of heart disease. The Department was notified of his death on September 14, by Captain Isaac McKeever, Commandant at New York, who stated that he had been informed of it by Commodore Matthew C. Perry." He was a resident of Scarborough, New York.

== Published works ==
- Mackenzie, Alexander Slidell. (1915) Commodore Oliver Hazard Perry : famous American naval hero, victor of the battle of Lake Erie, his life and achievements (Akron, Ohio: Superior Printing Co.)
- Mackenzie, Alexander Slidell (1840) The life of Commodore Oliver Hazard Perry. (New York, Harper) Volume 1, Volume 2.
- Mackenzie, Alexander Slidell (1841). The Life of Paul Jones. New York: Harper & Brothers.
- MacKenzie, Alexander Slidell (2005). Life of Stephen Decatur: a commodore in the Navy of the United States.
  C. C. Little and J. Brown, 1846 – Biography & Autobiography – 443 pages.

== See also ==
- Alexander Slidell MacKenzie Jr. Civil War Officer
