= USS Sumpter =

Gunboat of the United States Navy

Coordinates: 37.0968°N 75.7040°W

- Parker Vein in merchant service prior to her commission as USS Sumpter

History

United States
- Name: USS Sumpter
- Builder: Hillman and Streaker; Philadelphia, Pennsylvania
- Launched: 1853
- Acquired: by purchase, 26 May 1859
- Fate: Sank following collision, 24 June 1863

General characteristics
- Type: Steamship
- Displacement: 464 long tons (471 t)
- Length: 163 ft (50 m)
- Beam: 24 ft 4 in (7.42 m)
- Draft: 11 ft 9 in (3.58 m)
- Propulsion: Steam engine
- Complement: 64 officers and enlisted
- Armament: 4 × 32-pounder guns; 1 × 12-pounder smoothbore gun; 1 × 20-pounder Parrott rifle

USS Sumpter was a steamship in the United States Navy during the American Civil War.

Sumpter or Sumter, ex-Atlanta, ex-Parker Vein, was built in 1853 by Hillman and Streaker, Philadelphia. The merchant steamer Atlanta was chartered by the Navy on 13 September 1858, to take part in the expedition against Paraguay; purchased outright on 26 May 1859, and renamed Sumpter.

== Service history ==
Under the command of Commander Daniel R. Ridgely, Atlanta and 18 other warships arrived at Asunción, on 25 January 1859, to take action against that country for firing on USS Water Witch in 1855. However, the government of Paraguay offered an apology and paid an indemnity which settled the affair without resorting to violence.

When the squadron returned to the United States, the ship was purchased outright and renamed Sumpter. Sumpter and four other screw steamers were assigned to cruise the coasts of Cuba and Africa to suppress the slave trade. Sumpter sailed from the west coast of Africa, on 10 August 1861, and returned to the United States on 15 September.

On 6 January 1862, Sumpter was ordered to report to Port Royal, South Carolina, and join the South Atlantic Blockading Squadron and on 2 February was reported to have joined the squadron, and the next day sailed to Charleston. On 18 March, she participated in the capture of the British blockade runner Emil St. Pierre off that port. The ship returned to Port Royal, on 23 April, for repairs and departed on the 29th to take station off Wassaw Inlet, Georgia.

Sumpter rejoined the blockade off Charleston in early May and remained there until August. In mid-May, she sent a boat to Port Pulaski to gain information regarding Confederate gunboats; but the boat wandered into St. Augustine Creek, near Fort Jackson, and was captured. She was then ordered to Fernandina, Florida, to join the blockade there. The steamer sailed from there on 6 October en route to New York City for repairs, via Port Royal. After her repairs were completed, Sumpter was assigned to the North Atlantic Blockading Squadron at Hampton Roads. Her duty was to search for Confederate cruisers and blockade runners. She was stationed off Hampton Bar in May 1863 but, the following month, was sent to the Yorktown, Virginia area to search for the Confederate privateer, Clarence. On the morning of 24 June, she collided with the Union transport, USS General Meigs eight or nine miles from the Smith Island lighthouse and sank in seven fathoms (42 feet (13 meters) of water. The officers and crew were rescued by Jamestown and taken to Newport News, Virginia.

As of 2005, no other ship in the United States Navy has borne the name Sumpter, although there was a USS Sumter (APA-52), an attack transport which served with the U.S. Navy during World War II, and a USS Sumter (LST-1181), a tank landing ship decommissioned in 1993.

== See also ==
- Union Navy
- Union blockade
