= USS MacKenzie (TB-17) =

Torpedo boat of the United States Navy

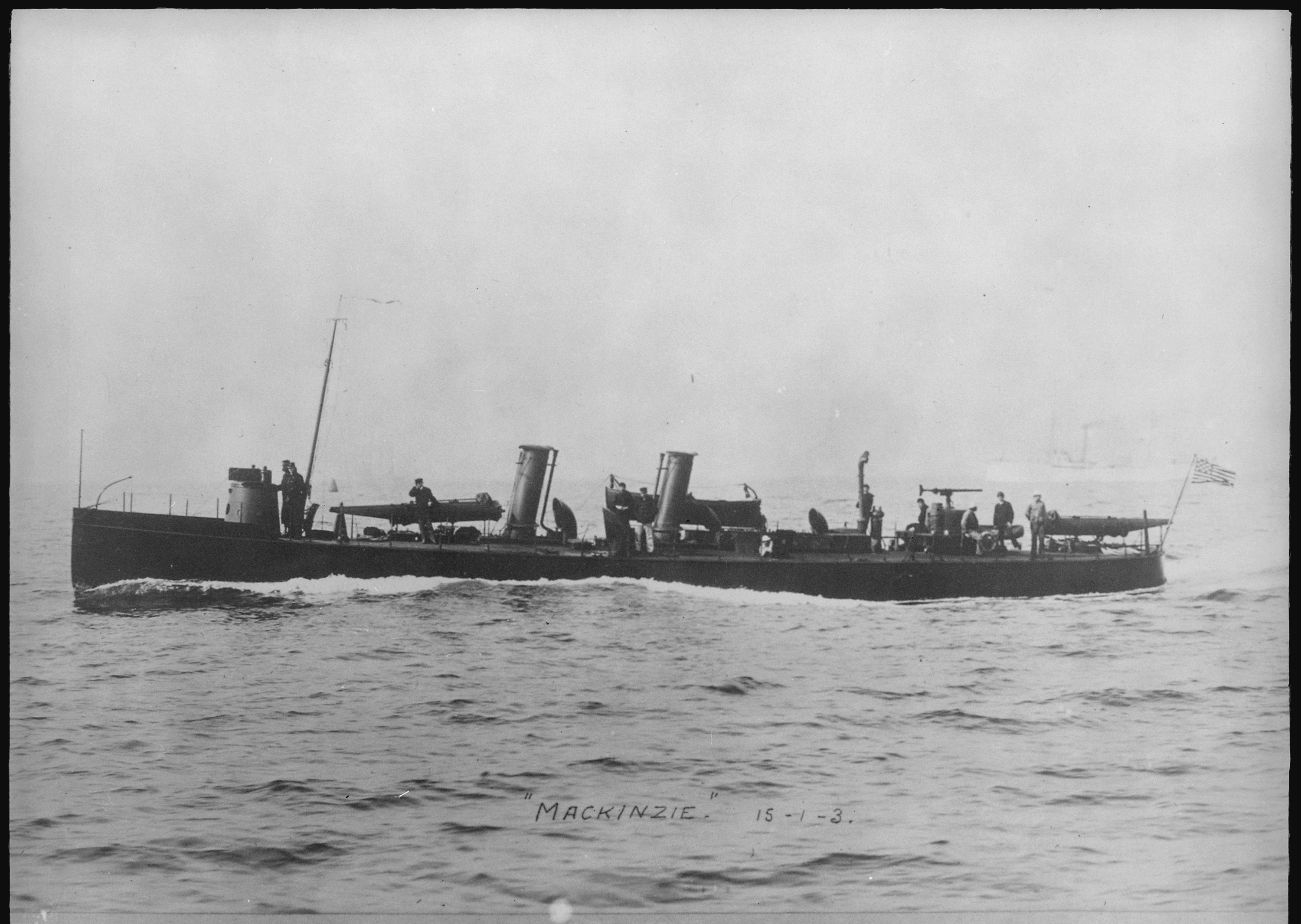
- USS MacKenzie (TB-17) underway, c. 1901

History

United States
- Name: MacKenzie
- Namesake: Lt. Commander Alexander S. MacKenzie
- Ordered: 10 June 1896 (authorised)
- Builder: Hillman & Sons, Philadelphia
- Laid down: 15 April 1897
- Launched: 19 February 1898
- Sponsored by: Master Charles Hillman
- Commissioned: 1 May 1899
- Decommissioned: 10 March 1916
- Stricken: 10 March 1916
- Identification: TB-17
- Fate: Target ship

General characteristics
- Class & type: MacKenzie-class torpedo boat
- Displacement: 65 long tons (66 t)
- Length: 101 ft 6 in (30.94 m)
- Beam: 12 ft 9 in (3.89 m)
- Draft: 4 ft 3 in (1.30 m) (mean)
- Installed power: 2 × Thornycroft boilers; 850 ihp (630 kW)
- Propulsion: vertical triple expansion engine; 1 × screw propellers
- Speed: 20.1 knots (37.2 km/h; 23.1 mph); 20.11 kn (23.14 mph; 37.24 km/h) (Speed on Trial)
- Complement: 14 officers and enlisted
- Armament: 1 × 1-pounder (37 mm (1.46 in)) guns; 1 × 18 inch (450 mm) torpedo tubes

The first USS MacKenzie (Torpedo Boat No. 17/TB-17), was laid down by Charles Hillman Ship & Engine Building Company, Philadelphia, 15 April 1897; launched 19 February 1898; sponsored by Master Charles Hillman; and commissioned 1 May 1899.

Departing League Island 28 May 1899, MacKenzie sailed north to Newport. Arriving on the 31st, she decommissioned and joined other torpedo boats, such as USS Du Pont and USS Winslow, in occasional employment in experimental and training duties. Recommissioned 7 November 1902, she steamed to Norfolk where she joined the Reserve Torpedo Flotilla on the 14th. Serving with that flotilla for the greater part of the next 10 years, she was occasionally used as a training ship at the US Naval Academy, and in 1908 operated off the southeastern seaboard.

She decommissioned at Charleston, South Carolina, 15 April 1912, and departed the next day for Florida. She arrived at Key West 19 April and on 7 May was turned over to the Florida Naval Militia, in which she served until returned to the Navy in November 1914. She cruised off southern Florida for the next year, cruising to Havana in October 1915. In 1916, the torpedo boat was designated as a target ship and 10 March 1916 her name was struck from the Navy list.
