= USS MacKenzie (DD-175) =

Wickes-class destroyer

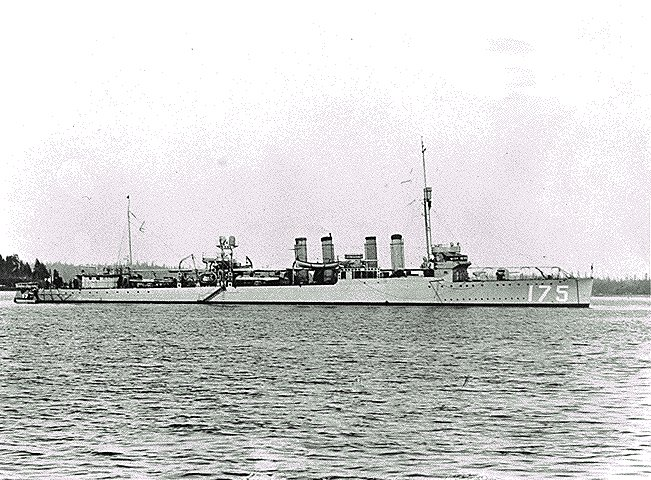
- USS MacKenzie (DD-175)

History

United States
- Name: USS MacKenzie
- Namesake: Alexander Slidell MacKenzie
- Builder: Union Iron Works, San Francisco, California
- Laid down: 4 July 1918
- Launched: 29 September 1918
- Commissioned: 25 July 1919
- Decommissioned: 27 May 1922
- Recommissioned: 6 November 1939
- Decommissioned: 24 September 1940
- Stricken: 8 January 1941
- Identification: DD-175
- Fate: Transferred to Canada, 24 September 1940

Canada
- Name: HMCS Annapolis
- Namesake: Annapolis River of Nova Scotia
- Commissioned: 24 September 1940
- Identification: Pennant number: I04
- Honours and awards: Atlantic, 1941-43
- Fate: Sold for scrapping, 4 June 1945

General characteristics
- Class & type: Wickes-class destroyer
- Displacement: 1,200 tons (full load)
- Length: 314 ft 4 1/2 in (95.82 m)
- Beam: 30 ft 11 1/4 in (9.43 m)
- Draft: 9 ft (2.7 m)
- Propulsion: 27,000 shp (20,000 kW); two shaft geared turbines
- Speed: 35 kn (65 km/h; 40 mph)
- Complement: 145 officers and enlisted
- Armament: 4 x single 4 in (102 mm)/50 cal guns; 1 x 3 in (76 mm) AA gun; 3 x 12.7mm machine guns; 12 x 21 in (533 mm) torpedo tubes (4x3)

USS MacKenzie (DD–175) was a Wickes-class destroyer in the United States Navy following World War I. In 1940, as part of the Destroyers for Bases Agreement she was transferred to the Royal Canadian Navy as the Town-class destroyer HMCS Annapolis.

== Construction and career ==
=== United States Navy ===
The second Navy ship to be named for Alexander Slidell MacKenzie, she was laid down by Union Iron Works, San Francisco, California on 4 July 1918. The ship was launched on 29 September 1918; sponsored by Mrs. Percy J. Cotton. MacKenzie was commissioned on 25 July 1919. On 17 July 1920, she was designated DD-175.

Following commissioning and shakedown, MacKenzie became a unit of the Pacific Fleet and operated with Destroyer Squadrons 2 and 4 until decommissioned at Mare Island on 27 May 1922. MacKenzie remained in reserve until she recommissioned at San Diego on 6 November 1939.

In 1940, the ship was one of 50 destroyers exchanged for strategic bases off the North American coast under the terms of the Destroyers for Bases Agreement. She arrived at Halifax, Nova Scotia on 20 September 1940. She decommissioned and was turned over to the Royal Canadian Navy on 24 September and recommissioned as HMCS Annapolis on 2 October. MacKenzie was struck from the US Navy list 8 January 1941.

=== Royal Canadian Navy ===
Following the Canadian practice of naming destroyers after Canadian rivers, HMCS Annapolis was named after the Annapolis River of Nova Scotia; and, with deference to the U.S. origin, sharing a name of significance to the United States Naval Academy.

Annapolis's no. 4 boiler was damaged during workup and was removed and not replaced, together with a funnel, during repair which continued until February 1941. Until 1944, Annapolis sailed with the Halifax and Western Local Escort Forces escorting convoys from east of St. John's, Newfoundland, to New York. In April 1944, she was attached to HMCS Cornwallis, near Annapolis, Nova Scotia, where she remained as a training ship until the end of the war. On 4 June 1945, she was turned over to the War Assets Corporation and sold to Frankel Brothers, Ltd., of Toronto for scrapping.

The ship's bell of HMCS Annapolis is currently held by the town of Annapolis Royal in Nova Scotia. The Christening Bells Project at Canadian Forces Base Esquimalt Naval and Military Museum includes information from the ship's bell of HMCS Annapolis, which was used for baptism of babies on board ship.
