= USS MacKenzie (DD-614) =

Benson-class destroyer

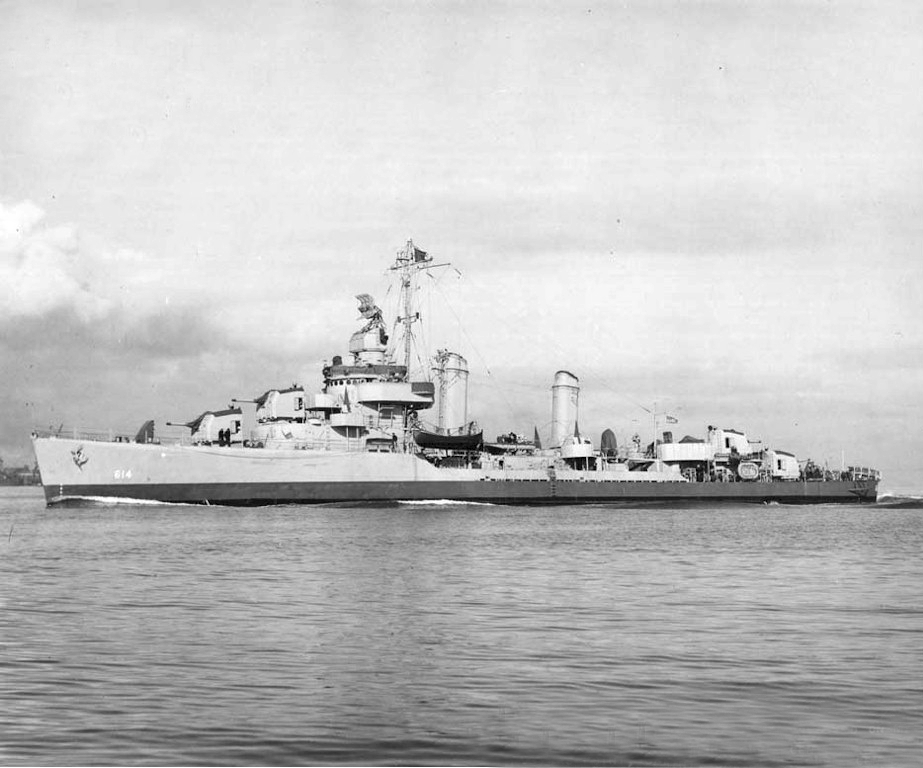
- USS MacKenzie (DD-614) underway off Hunters Point, California, 5 February 1943

History

United States
- Name: USS MacKenzie (DD-614)
- Namesake: Alexander Slidell MacKenzie
- Builder: Bethlehem Shipbuilding, San Pedro, California
- Laid down: 29 May 1941
- Launched: 27 June 1942
- Commissioned: 21 November 1942
- Decommissioned: 4 February 1946
- Stricken: 1 July 1971
- Fate: Sunk in fleet exercises on 1 June 1974

General characteristics
- Class & type: Benson-class destroyer
- Displacement: 1,620 tons
- Length: 348 ft 4 in (106.17 m)
- Beam: 36 ft 1 in (11.00 m)
- Draft: 17 ft 4 in (5.28 m)
- Speed: 37.5 kn (69.5 km/h)
- Complement: 259
- Armament: 4 x 5 in (130 mm)/38 guns, 4 x 40 mm., 7 x 20 mm., 5 x 21 inch (533 mm) tt., 6dcp.

USS MacKenzie (DD-614) was a Benson-class destroyer in the United States Navy during World War II. She was the third ship named for Lieutenant Commander Alexander Slidell MacKenzie.

MacKenzie was laid down 29 May 1941 by the Bethlehem Shipbuilding, San Pedro, California; launched 27 June 1942; sponsored by Miss Gail Nielsen, descendant of Lieutenant Commander MacKenzie; and commissioned 21 November 1942.

== Service history ==
MacKenzie transited the Panama Canal 1 March 1943, after completion of shakedown and training cruises, and continued on to spend her entire World War II career in the Atlantic and Mediterranean theaters. She arrived at Casco Bay, Maine, 13 March and commenced coastwise escort duties. In May, she graduated to transatlantic convoy assignments, completing two voyages to the Mediterranean Sea by the end of June. On 16 May, she made two depth charge attacks on a sonar contact; postwar review of German records proved them successful in the sinking of U-182.

Relieved of transatlantic duties at the end of June, she reported to the staging area for the "Cent" Attack Force, one of three such forces to initiate the Sicilian campaign. On 9 July she departed the north African coast, arriving at Scoglitti, Sicily, the next day to screen the transport vessels and provide fire support. She destroyed 14 tanks and guns along the beach and underwent several bombing attacks that day, and received a battle star for this action. Three days later, the destroyer returned to convoy duty, conducting convoys between the United States and the Mediterranean until 7 October, and then engaging in escort work between North America and the United Kingdom. A collision while shifting berths at Swansea, Wales, on 19 October resulted in a 41 day delay for repairs. After repairs, she made two more ocean crossings escorting convoys from England to the U.S., and in February escorted a convoy to Gibraltar and Oran, Algeria, before beginning operations in the Mediterranean.

On 18 March 1944, MacKenzie steamed into the harbor at Naples to report for screening, fire support and antisubmarine patrol duties in conjunction with the Anzio operation. Starting her Anzio assignments with an assist in the sinking of a two-man submarine on the 19th, she continued to provide support on this front by engaging in beach bombardments and night patrols along the Italian coast, until resuming convoy duties 6 June. Taking up the offensive again in August, MacKenzie took part in Operation Dragoon, providing fire support for this invasion of southern France by covering the landing of the 36th Infantry Division on the French coast and providing fire support for the troops on the beach. On 27 August, she was the destination for 16 Germans who rowed out from their fortifications that were under fire, to surrender. On 15 September, she departed the Mediterranean and headed for Boston, Massachusetts and a 5-month repair and overhaul period.

The destroyer took up duty in the Mediterranean again in February 1945. From 28 March through 21 April MacKenzie spent her days in the bombardment of the Franco-Italian border in support of the 5th Army, and her nights on the blockade of the Gulf of Genoa along with British and French destroyers. In May, having assisted in the continuance of an effective second front, MacKenzie was assigned to convoy duty in the Strait of Gibraltar. She remained in the Mediterranean after the capitulation of the Third Reich, cruising its waters until returning to the United States in July.

Upon her arrival, MacKenzie underwent 30 days overhaul and alterations in Boston, and two weeks of training in Cuba, preparatory to going to the Pacific. She was then ordered to Norfolk, Virginia for duty with the aircraft carrier USS Lake Champlain (CV-39), and acted as plane guard for it until Navy Day. On 4 November she entered the Charleston Navy Yard for inactivation. She decommissioned 4 February 1946 and in January 1947 entered the reserve fleet at Philadelphia, Pennsylvania. She was struck from the Naval Vessel Register on 1 July 1971 and sunk in fleet exercises on 1 June 1974.

== Awards ==
MacKenzie received four battle stars for World War II service:

1. Antisubmarine action of 16 May 1943
2. Participation in the occupation of Sicily (9-15 July 1943)
3. Taking part in the bombardments of the Formia-Anzio areas (12 May-4 June 1944)
4. Participation in the invasion of southern France (15 August-25 September 1944)
