= USS Porcupine (IX-126) =

Armadillo-class tanker of the US Navy

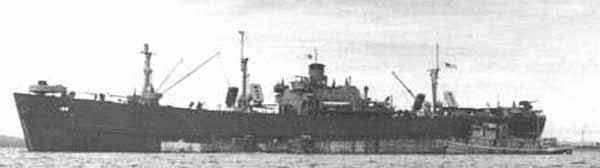
- USS Porcupine (IX-126) at anchor, September 1944, place unknown.

History

United States
- Laid down: 11 October 1943
- Launched: 24 November 1943
- Commissioned: 30 December 1943
- Stricken: 19 January 1945
- Fate: Sunk in action on 30 December 1944 at Mangarin Bay.

General characteristics
- Type: Z-ET1-S-C3 Type (Liberty Ship Tanker)
- Displacement: 3,665 tons
- Length: 441 ft 6 in (134.57 m)
- Beam: 57 ft (17 m)
- Draft: 27 ft 9 in (8.46 m)
- Speed: 11 knots
- Complement: 79 officers and enlisted men
- Armament: 1 × 5-inch 38 caliber dual purpose gun; 1 × 3 in (76 mm) gun; 8 × 20 mm cannons

USS Porcupine (IX-126), an Armadillo-class tanker (aka Z-ET1-S-C3 class Liberty Ship Tanker) designated an unclassified miscellaneous vessel, was the second ship of the United States Navy to be named for the porcupine.

A station tanker, her keel was laid down 11 October 1943 as SS Leif Ericson (MCE Hull 1930) by the Delta Shipbuilding Corporation in New Orleans, Louisiana. She was named Porcupine on 23 October, launched on 24 November, accepted by the Navy 29 December; and commissioned the next day. After shakedown in the Gulf of Mexico, the new Liberty ship was assigned mobile oil storage duties with the Service Force, Pacific Fleet. Transiting the Panama Canal, she arrived Noumea, New Caledonia on 28 March and commenced fuel storage and transportation operations in the area of Nouméa, Langemak Bay, and Milne Bay, New Guinea; and Seeadler Harbor, Manus, Admiralty Islands. By the end of November she was at Hollandia, New Guinea, and during the last days of 1944 she was a unit of resupply convoy "Uncle plus 15," which formed off Dulag, the Philippines, on 27 December and steamed up Leyte Gulf for Mindoro. The one hundred vessels of the convoy, under the command of Captain J. B. McLean, were screened by nine destroyers.

From 0330, 28 December, when the convoy entered Surigao Strait, until it returned to Leyte, it was either under air attack, or hostile aircraft were held on its radars. With sunrise came the report that weather at Leyte was so foul that no Combat Air Patrol (CAP) could come out. Thus no air cover was available until after noon. But the weather was altogether too fair in the waters plowed by the convoy. At 1012 two groups of three planes each from Cebu attacked. One aircraft was immediately splashed, and another, which attempted to crash into aviation-gasoline laden Porcupine, overshot its target, and splashed into the sea. Liberty ships William Sharon and John Burke were less fortunate. Both were hit, and Burke went down with a mighty explosion. Sharon's superstructure was a mass of flame. Firefighters from USS Wilson (DD-408) finally extinguished the fires, and salvage tug USS Grapple (ARS-7) towed Sharon back to Leyte. Thus Mindoro never received Sharon's cargo of TNT, fuel, trucks, rations, and beer.

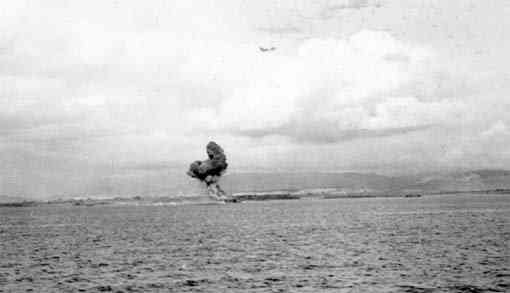
USS Porcupine (IX-126), filled with aviation fuel, is struck by a kamikaze plane about 1549, 30 December 1944, off White Beach, Mangarin Bay, Mindoro, in the Philippines.

An evening air raid resulted in the loss of LST-750. The next day saw Leyte still blacked in, but Mindoro responded to Captain McLean's requests for air cover, and the convoy suffered no damage 29 December. The ships arrived Mangarin Bay on 30 December 1944 at 0710. Captain McLean was eager to offload his ships and head back to Leyte before dark. Until 1540 events ran smoothly, but then five Vals broke through and made a suicide attack. Within two minutes destroyers USS Gansevoort (DD-608) and USS Pringle (DD-477), tender USS Orestes (AGP-10), and Porcupine were hit. Porcupine was hit off White Beach by a low flyer which came in off her port bow. She opened fire with all guns, but was unable to divert the attacking Val from its course. The kamikaze released a bomb over Porcupine’s main deck and crashed in after it. Seven Porcupine sailors died and eight were wounded. Fuel tanks ruptured; the engine room flooded, and the plane's engine passed through the ship's hull, tearing a large hole beneath her water line. Gansevoort, surviving her hit, was towed toward the PT base at Caminavit Point and anchored in 15 fathoms of water. She was soon ordered to blow off Porcupine’s stern in order to prevent flames from reaching the aviation gasoline. One of the destroyer's torpedoes slammed into Porcupine but the flames were not stemmed. The aviation gasoline ignited, and Porcupine burned to the water line. She was struck from the Naval Vessel Register on 19 January 1945. Another report says she was loaded with ammo and blew up when hit by the Kamakaze.
