= Philip Spencer (sailor) =

United States navy officer (1823–1842)

- Philip Spencer by Blendon Campbell, courtesy of the Union College Permanent Collection
- Born: January 28, 1823; Canandaigua, New York, US
- Died: December 1, 1842 (aged 19); Atlantic Ocean, aboard USS Somers
- Cause of death: Execution by hanging
- Occupation: Sailor
- Known for: Somers Affair
- Parent: John C. Spencer

Philip Spencer (January 28, 1823 – December 1, 1842), a midshipman aboard USS Somers, was executed for mutiny without a court-martial, after being suspected of conspiring to kill opposing crewmembers and turn the brig into a pirate ship. He was the son of John C. Spencer, Secretary of War in U.S. President John Tyler's administration, and the grandson of Ambrose Spencer, a New York politician and lawyer.

== Background ==
Spencer was born in Canandaigua, New York. He was described as handsome, despite a "wandering eye" (possibly strabismus) which surgery was unable to correct. As a youth at Geneva College (now Hobart College), he was considered wild and uncontrollable despite displaying signs of high intelligence. His favorite reading matter was pirate stories. After an abortive stay at Union College – where he was a founder of the Chi Psi Fraternity – Spencer ran away and signed on a whaler at Nantucket. His father located him and convinced him that if a life on the sea was what he wanted, to live it as "a gentleman"; i.e., as a commissioned officer.

As Secretary of War, it was easy for Spencer's father to procure his son a midshipman's commission. Spencer proved to be just as intractable as ever, assaulting a superior officer aboard USS North Carolina twice while under the influence of alcohol. Reassigned to USS John Adams, he was involved in a drunken brawl with a Royal Navy officer while on shore leave in Rio de Janeiro. He was allowed to resign rather than face court-martial, but due to his father's position in the Cabinet, his resignation was not accepted. Instead, he was posted to USS Somers.

Aboard Somers, Spencer gained favor with the ratings – many of whom were boys – through his privileged access to tobacco and rum. He also exhibited an irreverent attitude toward the navy and his captain, Alexander Slidell Mackenzie. In November 1842, during the return home from a voyage to Liberia, suspicion arose that Spencer had formed a plan to seize Somers and sail her as a pirate ship. His friendship with crew members Samuel Cromwell and Elisha Small was cited as evidence, as both these men were rumored to have sailed aboard slavers in the past.

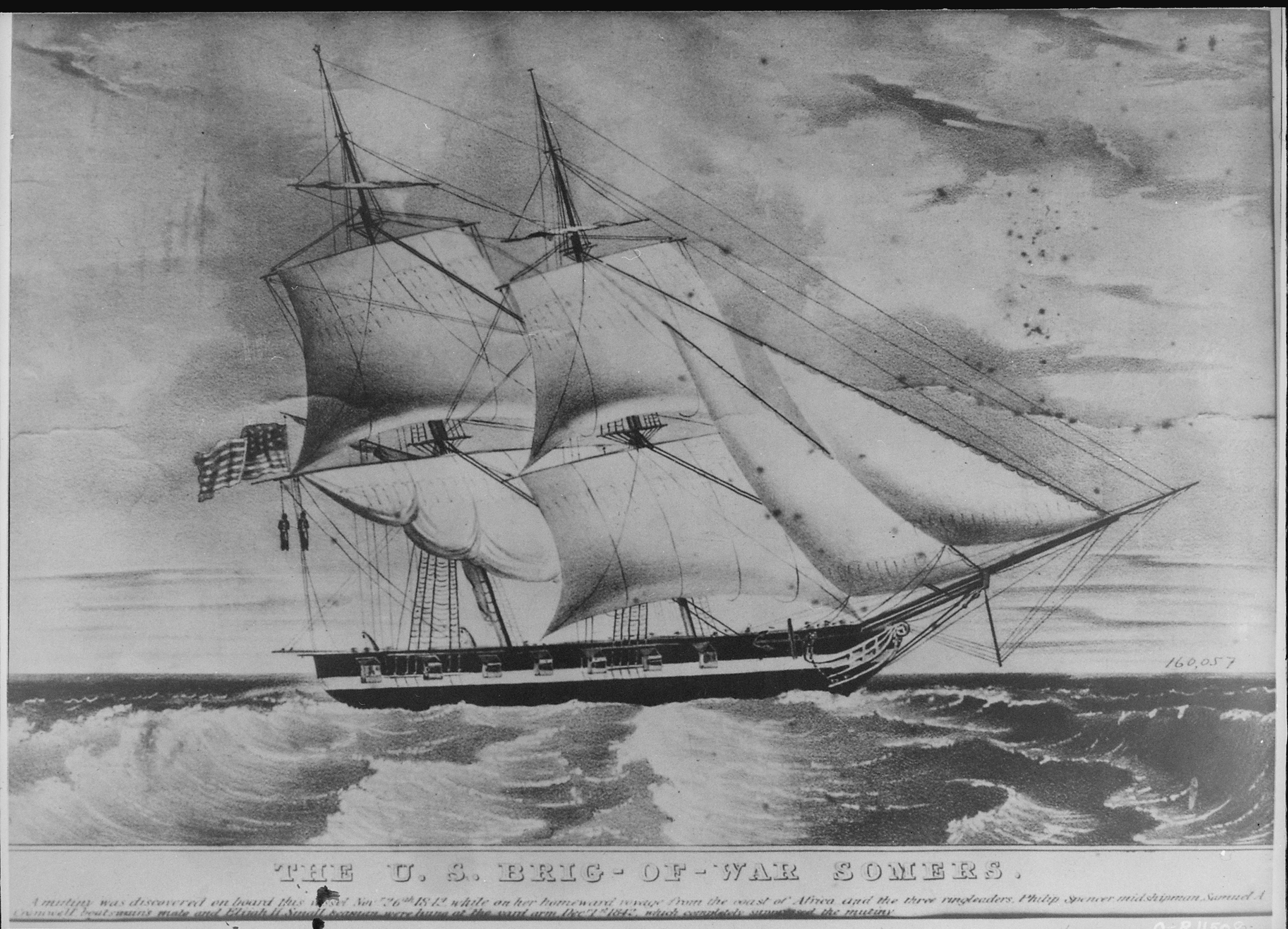
USS Somers, 1842 lithograph, with men hanging from yardarm

On November 26, Spencer was shackled and detained on Somers' foredeck after a list of names was found in his razor case. The names had been written using Greek letters. The following day, Cromwell and Small were also detained on the foredeck. After a meeting of the ship's officers, all three men were hanged on the yardarm on December 1 (at 17°34′28″N 41°24′45″W). Spencer was nearly 20 years old.

=== Court of Inquiry ===
When the brig returned to New York, the Secretary of the Navy convened a court of flag officers to investigate the matter. Following a month of testimony, on January 23, 1843, the court of inquiry exonerated the captain and his officers, ruling the hangings fully justified. Although the commander was exonerated, public opinion was against him. Mackenzie requested a court-martial for himself. The court martial acquitted him on a split vote.

=== Court of public opinion ===
The government accepted the court's decision, but the acquittal did not satisfy public concerns with the case. Many commentators, including James Fenimore Cooper, denounced the hangings as murder and criticized the Navy's handling of the matter.

The circumstance of Spencer, Cromwell and Small's deaths is one reason the U.S. Navy stopped training boys at sea and founded the United States Naval Academy. Philip Spencer and the USS Somers affair were almost certainly a model for much of the story Billy Budd, by Herman Melville, who was the first cousin of Lieutenant Guert Gansevoort, an officer aboard the ship.
