= USS Gansevoort =

Benson-class destroyer

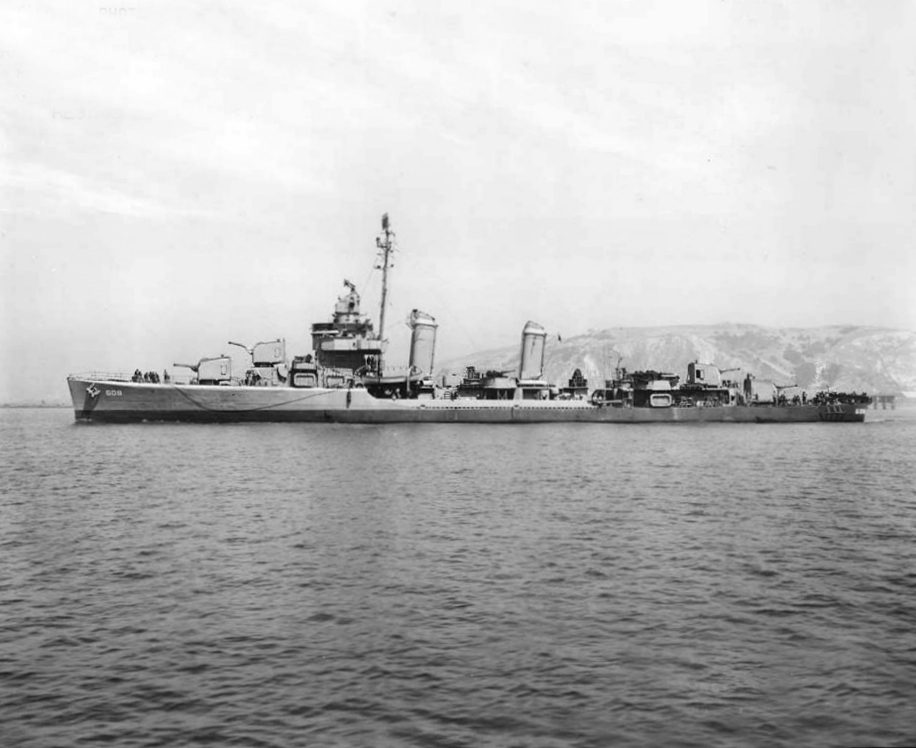
- USS Gansevoort (DD-608) off the Mare Island Naval Shipyard, California, 17 August 1945

History

United States
- Name: USS Gansevoort (DD-608)
- Namesake: Guert Gansevoort
- Builder: Bethlehem Shipbuilding Corporation, San Francisco, California
- Laid down: 16 June 1941
- Launched: 11 April 1942
- Commissioned: 25 August 1942
- Decommissioned: 1 February 1946
- Stricken: 1 July 1971
- Fate: Sunk as target, 23 March 1972

General characteristics
- Class & type: Benson-class destroyer
- Displacement: 1,620 tons
- Length: 348 ft 4 in (106.17 m)
- Beam: 36 ft 1 in (11.00 m)
- Draught: 17 ft 4 in (5.28 m)
- Speed: 37.5 kn (69.5 km/h)
- Complement: 276
- Armament: 4 x 5 in (130 mm)/38 guns, 6 x 20 mm, 5 x 21-inch (533 mm) tt., 6 dcp.

USS Gansevoort (DD-608) was a Benson-class destroyer in the United States Navy during World War II. She was named for Commodore Guert Gansevoort.

== Construction and commissioning ==
Gansevoort was laid down 16 June 1941 by the Bethlehem Steel Corporation, San Francisco, California; launched 11 April 1942; sponsored by Mrs. Robert C. Sofio, wife of a great-grandnephew of Commodore Gansevoort; and commissioned at San Francisco 25 August 1942.

== 1942 and 1943 ==
After shakedown, Gansevoort departed San Francisco 18 November 1942 in the screen of a convoy bound via Hawaii to Nouméa, New Caledonia, where she arrived 9 December. Assigned to the South Pacific forces, she spent the next three months giving convoy protection to troop and supply ships reinforcing Guadalcanal from New Caledonia; the New Hebrides; Wellington and Auckland, New Zealand.

This duty terminated 18 March 1943, when Gansevoort departed Espiritu Santo, New Hebrides, to become a unit of Rear Admiral Charles H. McMorris' Northern Covering Group of cruisers and destroyers in the approaches to Attu, Aleutian Islands. She took part in the preinvasion bombardment of Attu 26 April; made several depth charge attacks on a Japanese submarine in that area 14 May for unconfirmed results; screened convoys on the northern and southern approaches around the Aleutian chain; and twice participated in the bombardment of Kiska, Alaska (2 and 12 August).

She departed Kulka Bay 24 August for repairs in the Puget Sound Naval Shipyard until 28 September, then steamed via Hawaii with Destroyer Division 27 to Wellington, New Zealand. Here, Gansevoort became a unit of Rear Admiral Hill's Southern Attack Force which carried Major General Julian Smith's 2d Marine Division to Tarawa Atoll, Gilbert Islands.

Gansevoort provided continuous gunfire support to Marines during the initial landings on Tarawa 20 November, closing the beach to blast enemy strongpoints with point blank fire. On 24 November, she sped to support Marine forces occupying Apamama Atoll. After embarking Marine wounded, she opened an accurate bombardment that destroyed the entire Japanese garrison on that atoll. She conducted antisubmarine patrol around Tarawa until 4 December, then proceeded via Hawaii to San Francisco where both her high pressure turbines were replaced.

== 1944 ==
Gansevoort departed San Francisco 13 March 1944 to join the screen of a convoy bound from Hawaii to Majuro Atoll in the Marshall Islands where she arrived 1 April. During several months of blockade and antisubmarine patrol in waters off the bypassed enemy garrisons in the eastern Marshalls, she rescued several Marine aviators. Once she closed to within 500 yards of a beach to shell shore batteries while her whaleboat picked up an aviator. She also helped reduce enemy coastal defenses by assisting in the bombardment of Mille Atoll (26 May and 9 June) and Taroa Atoll (8 August). Detached from this duty 19 August, she replenished in Pearl Harbor, then sailed via New Guinea to Manus, Admiralty Islands, to join forces staging for the liberation of the Philippine Islands.

Gansevoort joined Destroyer Squadron 48 in guarding transports of Vice Admiral Theodore S. Wilkinson's Southern Attack Force off the beachhead of Leyte 20–21 October. From 27 October until 13 December she escorted troop and supply convoys between New Guinea and the Philippines. On 27 December she joined a large supply convoy at Dulag, Leyte. Comprising 99 naval and merchant ships, this important supply convoy departed the 27th to carry men and material to Mindoro. Steaming via Surigao Strait, the ships came under heavy, constant attacks from Japanese bombers and torpedo and suicide planes. As the convoy steamed through the Mindanao and Sulu Seas, the enemy attacked by day and night between 28 December and 30 December and created nearly 72 hours of hell and hard work for sailors in nearly a hundred ships.

Called to General Quarters 49 times in 72 hours, Gansevoort's gunners shot down 5 enemy planes and assisted in shooting down 12 others. Although enemy planes sank one merchant ship and one LST and severely damaged another merchant ship and Porcupine, their desperate attacks could not halt this powerful force.

She entered Mangarin Bay, Mindoro, with the convey the morning of 30 December 1944. That afternoon, a kamikaze crashed Gansevoort's main deck to port. A terrific explosion cut steering and electric power, started several fires, and killed or wounded 34 of her crew. Damage control parties could not get aft as her main deck was blown upward.

Destroyers Wilson and Philip helped fight her fires, then she was towed to the Mindoro PT base anchorage. Here, Gansevoort was given the unusual assignment of knocking off the stern of Porcupine with torpedoes, in an attempt to extinguish a fire before it reached the aviation gasoline stowed forward. The water was too shallow for torpedoes to be effective, and in spite of one torpedo hit, fire ignited the gasoline, spreading flames across the water to endanger Gansevoort.

Gansevoort was towed to safety in another anchorage off White Beach by U.S. Army cargo ship FS-367. With living quarters gutted, her crew made temporary camp on shore. Her engineering officer, damage control officer, and some twenty men remained on board working to save the ship. Despite recurring air attacks and several near misses by bombs, the destroyer escaped further damage and was made seaworthy after a full month of hazardous and exhausting repairs.

== 1945, end of World War II and fate ==
Despite periodic air attacks, salvage operations continued until 2 February 1945 when Gansevoort was taken in tow for San Pedro Bay, thence to Ulithi where emergency repairs were completed by 21 April. Steaming via Pearl Harbor, she returned to San Francisco 19 May for battle damage repairs. She then departed San Diego, California for the East Coast 3 October, arriving New York 20 October.

After participating in the Navy Day celebration in New York, Gansevoort departed 1 November for inactivation overhaul in the Charleston Naval Shipyard. She decommissioned there 1 February 1946 and entered the Atlantic Reserve Fleet. She was then berthed at Orange, Texas. Gansevoort was stricken from the Naval Vessel Register on 1 July 1971 and sunk as a target off Florida on 23 March 1972.

== Awards ==
Gansevoort received four battle stars for World War II service.
