= Alexander Slidell MacKenzie =

United States Navy officer from Civil War era

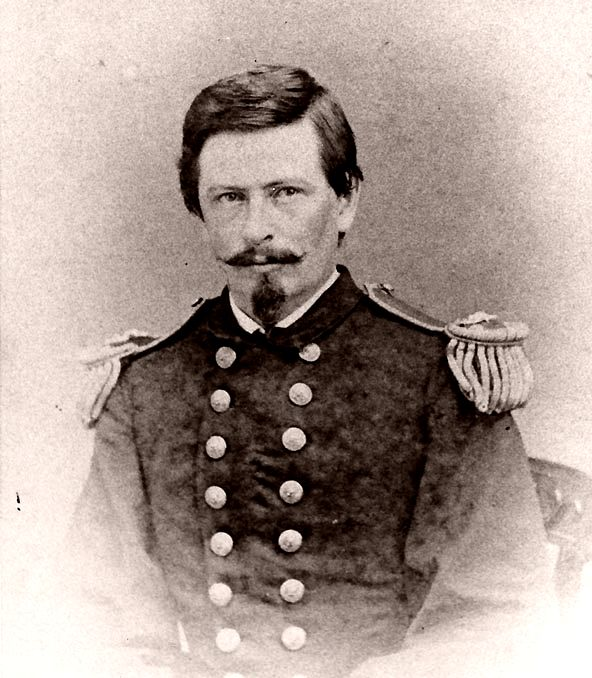
- Born: January 24, 1842
- Died: June 13, 1867 (aged 25); Kenting, Taiwan
- Relatives: Alexander Slidell Mackenzie (father); Matthew C. Perry (uncle); Ranald S. Mackenzie (brother)
- Military career
- Allegiance: United States of America; Union
- Branch: United States Navy
- Service years: 1859–1867
- Rank: Lieutenant commander
- Commands: USS Winona
- Conflicts: American Civil War; Formosa Expedition †

Alexander Slidell MacKenzie (January 24, 1842 – June 13, 1867) was an officer in the United States Navy during the American Civil War.

== Early life ==
He was the son of Catherine Alexander (Robinson) and Alexander Slidell Mackenzie, both of whom were natives of New York City. His father was a well-known naval officer whose career had been surrounded in controversy; his uncles included William Alexander Duer, John Slidell, and Matthew C. Perry. By the time of his birth, his parents had purchased a farm on the Hudson between Tarrytown and Sing Sing. His father died suddenly September 13, 1848, at his residence, near Tarrytown, N.Y., of heart disease.

== Military service ==
Appointed to the U.S. Naval Academy in 1855, he graduated in June 1859 and was assigned to the newly completed steam sloop of war Hartford. During the next two years, Midshipman MacKenzie served in that ship with the East India Squadron. Promoted to lieutenant in August 1861, he was an officer of the gunboat Kineo during the conquest of the lower Mississippi River in 1862. During 1863 and 1864 he later transferred to the South Atlantic Blockading Squadron, MacKenzie served off Charleston, South Carolina, in the steam frigate Wabash and monitor Patapsco, taking part in combat operations against Fort Sumter and Morris Island. Later in the Civil War he commanded the USS Winona, also in the waters off South Carolina. In July 1865 MacKenzie received the rank of lieutenant commander and soon began a second Far Eastern deployment in Hartford.

After the end of the war, he returned to the East Asia in Hartford, in which he served until June 13, 1867, when he was killed in action at Kenting, Taiwan, while leading a punitive expedition against the massacre of the entire crew of an American merchant bark Rover.

== Namesakes ==
Three ships of the Navy have been named USS MacKenzie in his honor.

== See also ==
- Alexander Slidell MacKenzie, Sr.
- Rover incident
- Ranald S. Mackenzie (brother)
