= Birely, Hillman & Streaker =

Shipbuilding company

Coordinates: 39°58′5.77″N 75°7′30.68″W

- Type: Defunct (taken over, 1888)
- Industry: Shipbuilding
- Founded: 1866
- Headquarters: Kensington, Philadelphia, USA
- Products: Wooden steamships
- Total assets: $85,000 (1880)
- Number of employees: 150 (1880)

Birely, Hillman & Streaker was a Philadelphia shipbuilding firm through the latter part of the 19th century. The shipyard specialized in the manufacturer of large wooden paddle steamers and wooden steamboats for the domestic American market.

== History ==
The company had its origins in two earlier Philadelphia shipyards, Birely & Sons (founded by John Birely) and Hillman & Streaker, both of which were established in the 1840s during the "golden age" of American wooden shipbuilding. In this period, Birely & Sons was Philadelphia's busiest shipyard, building seven modern screw steamers between 1849 and 1853 (including the S. S. Lewis, a transatlantic steamer built for the Boston & Liverpool Line).

Following the Civil War however, the shipbuilding industry experienced a severe slump. All Philadelphia shipbuilders engaged exclusively in the manufacture of wooden vessels were forced out of the industry, with the exception of Birely & Sons and Hillman & Streaker, which survived by pooling resources and merging in 1866 to become Birely, Hillman & Streaker. The new company's shipyard was located at the foot of Montgomery Avenue, Philadelphia.

In the following decades, the company mainly targeted the American domestic market, aided by government policies which protected domestic shipping routes to the end of the century. The company built both oceangoing ships for coastal trade as well as riverboats and ferries for inland transport. For example, it built the steamers Goldsboro and Delaware for the Clyde Line's North–South trade in the 1880s, as well as the side-wheeler City of Richmond for Clyde's steamboat line connecting Richmond and Norfolk. In lean times, the company would also occasionally take on military contracts, such as when it built the Haitian gunboats St. Michel and 1804 in 1875.

By 1880, Birely, Hillman & Streaker had net assets of $85,000, a workforce of 150 with annual wage costs of $66,412, raw materials costs of $67,756 and an annual output of $176,000. The company was able to keep asset costs low because it remained a specialized wooden shipbuilder, contracting out all its engine requirements—with their much larger capital investment—to local manufacturers of marine engines. In its early years, the main providers of engines for the company were the firms of I. P. Morris and Neafie & Levy, but after the 1870s, the company relied almost exclusively on engines built by Neafie & Levy, while Neafie & Levy returned the favour by subcontracting large wooden hulls to Birely for its own shipbuilding contracts. After 1871, Birely, Hillman & Streaker was the only Philadelphia shipbuilder to continue outsourcing its ship engines.

=== Buyout and closure ===
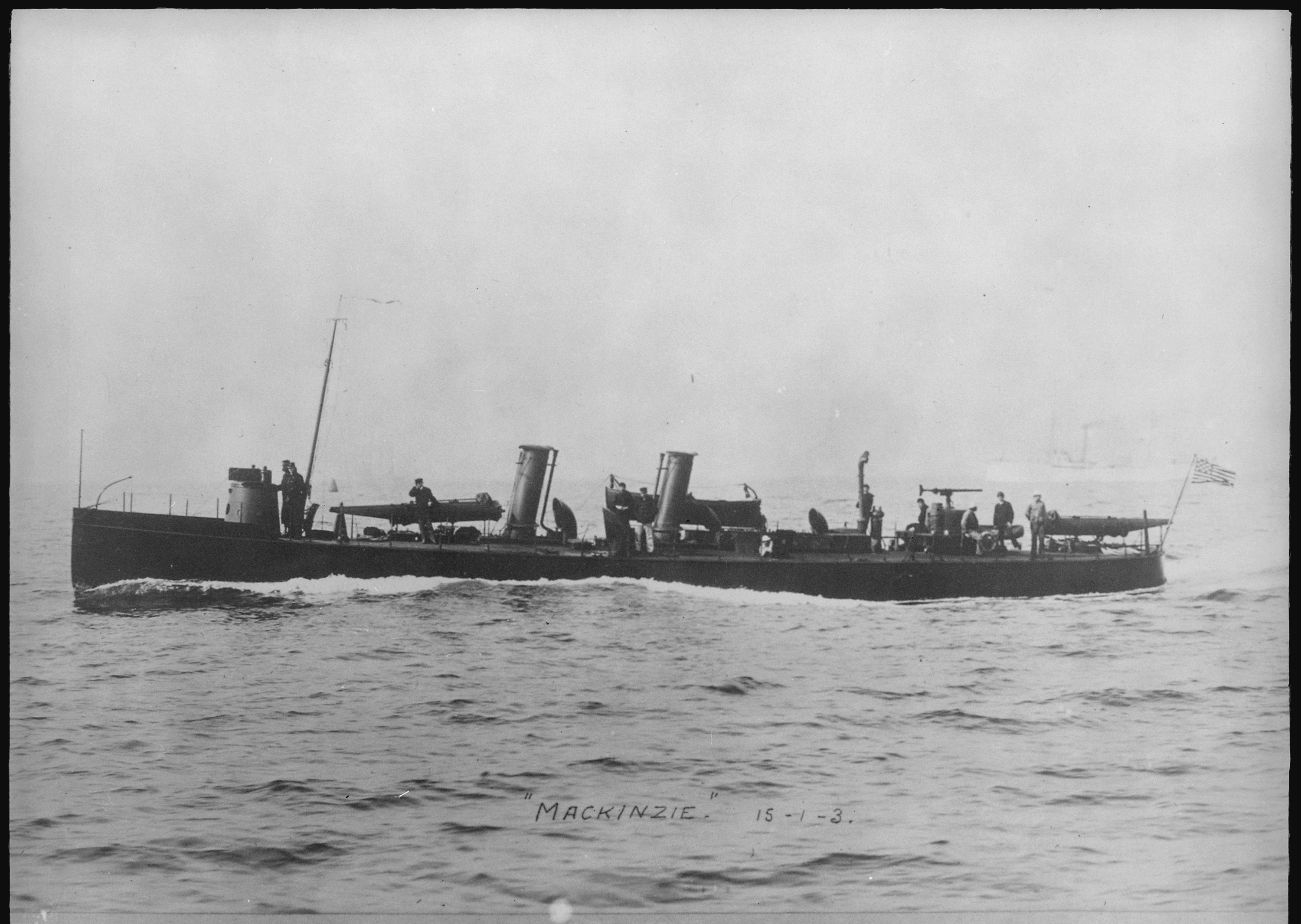
Delays in construction of USS MacKenzie (TB-17) bankrupted Hillman & Sons in 1899

In 1888, Charles Hillman and his three sons Bart, Josiah and Jonathan bought out the other two partners, Jacob Birely and David Streaker, and the firm became known as the Charles Hillman Ship & Engine Building Company, or just Hillman & Sons. The Hillmans had recognized the need for the firm to make the move to iron shipbuilding, and they quickly set up a plant for the manufacture of tugboat engines, which commenced production in 1889. By 1893 the company was ready to launch its first iron steamer, the Anthony B. Groves, for the Baltimore and Philadelphia Steamboat Company.

Delays in the construction of a torpedo boat for the US Navy, the USS MacKenzie, bankrupted the new company in 1899. Hillman & Sons was an example of the "naval contract syndrome" that drove a number of well established U.S. shipyards to closure in this era. The Hillman shipyard was subsequently acquired by William Cramp & Sons in 1900.

== Recurring references ==
- Heinrich, Thomas R. (1997): Ships for the Seven Seas: Philadelphia Shipbuilding in the Age of Industrial Capitalism, Johns Hopkins University Press, ISBN 0-8018-5387-7.
