= USS Somers (1842) =

Brig in the United States Navy

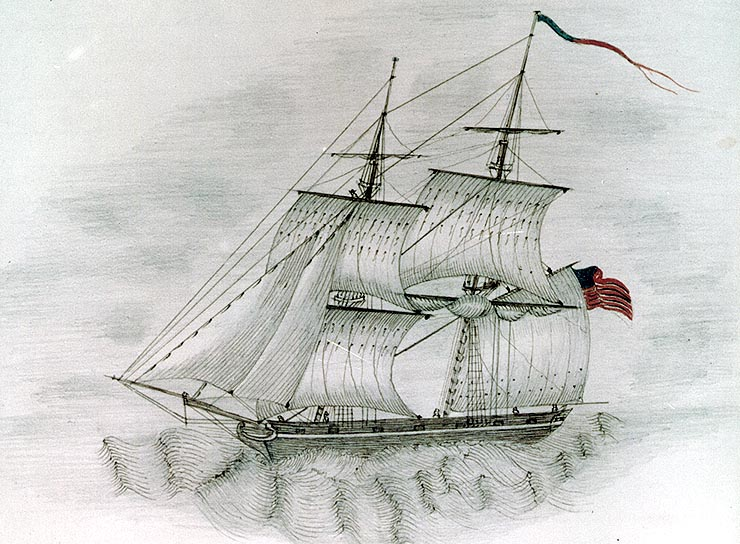
- USS Somers

History

United States
- Name: USS Somers
- Launched: 16 April 1842
- Commissioned: 12 May 1842
- Fate: Sank, 8 December 1846

General characteristics
- Displacement: 259 long tons (263 t)
- Length: 100 ft (30 m)
- Beam: 25 ft (7.6 m)
- Draft: 14 ft (4.3 m)
- Propulsion: Sail
- Complement: 13 officers and 180 men
- Armament: 10 × 32 pdr (15 kg) carronades

The second USS Somers was a brig in the United States Navy during the administration of President John Tyler. It became infamous for being the only U.S. Navy ship to undergo a mutiny which led to executions.

Somers was launched at the New York Navy Yard on 16 April 1842 and commissioned on 12 May 1842, with Commander Alexander Slidell Mackenzie in command.

== Initial cruise ==
After a shakedown cruise in June–July to the Spanish colony of Puerto Rico and back, the new brig sailed out of New York harbor on 13 September 1842 bound for the Atlantic coast of Africa with dispatches for frigate Vandalia. On this voyage, Somers was acting as an experimental schoolship for naval apprentices.

After calls at Madeira, Tenerife, and Praia, looking for Vandalia, Somers arrived at Monrovia, Liberia on 10 November and learned that the frigate had already sailed for home. The next day, Cdr. Mackenzie headed for the Virgin Islands hoping to meet Vandalia at St. Thomas before returning to New York.

== The "Somers Affair" ==
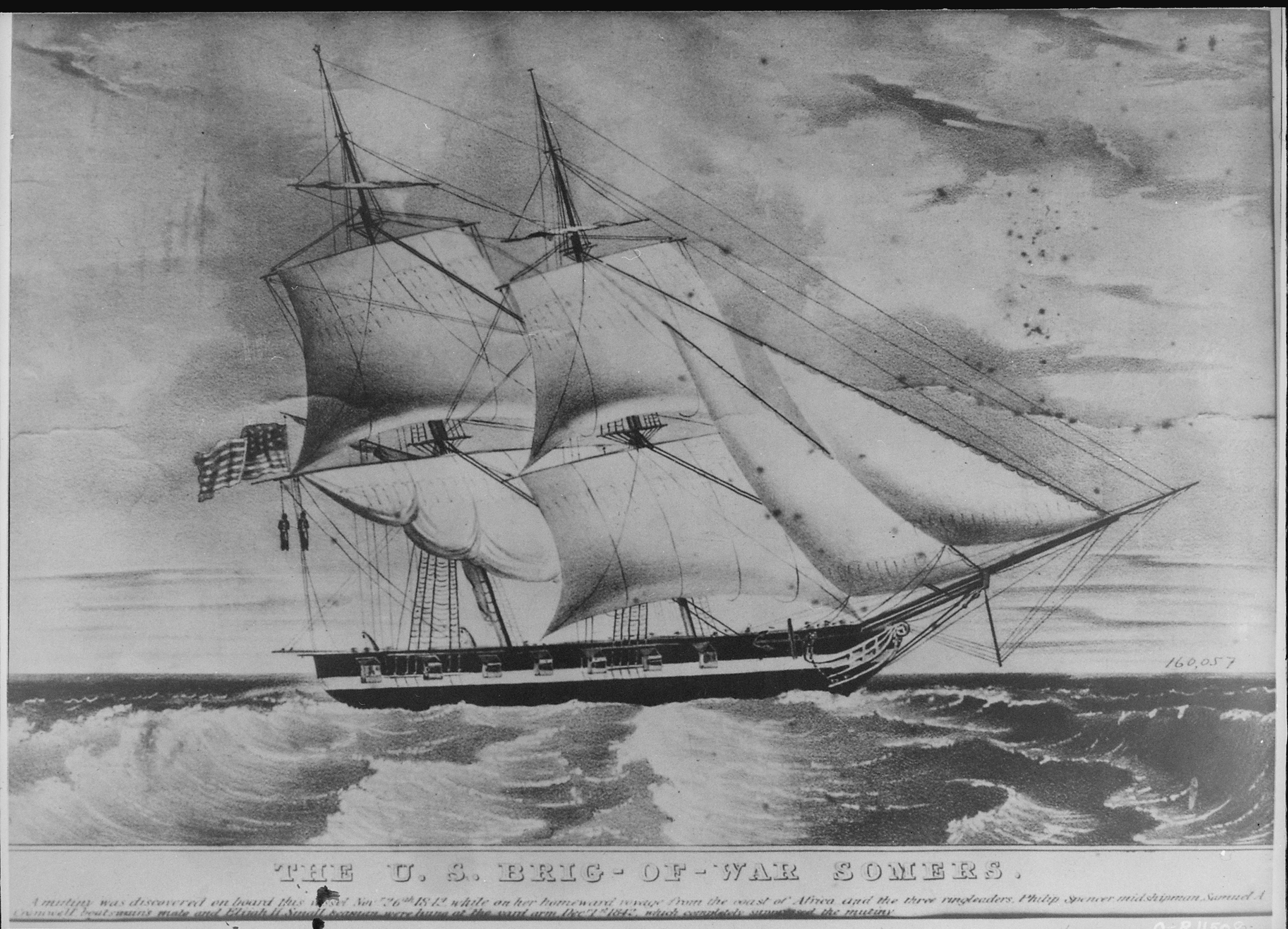
This lithograph, published circa 1843, shows the mutineers hanging under the US flag.

On 25 November 1842, during passage to the West Indies, Midshipman Philip Spencer, the son of Secretary of War John C. Spencer, allegedly told purser's steward J.W. Wales of a planned mutiny by approximately 20 members of Somers crew, who intended to use the ship for piracy from the Isle of Pines. Seaman Elisha Small was involved in the conversation, and Wales was threatened with death if he revealed Spencer's plan.

On 26 November, Wales notified Captain Mackenzie of the plan through his chain of command via purser H.M. Heiskell and First Lieutenant Guert Gansevoort. Captain Mackenzie was not inclined to take the matter seriously, but instructed Lt. Gansevoort to watch Spencer and the crew for evidence of confirmation. Lt. Gansevoort learned from other crew members that Spencer had been observed in secret nightly conferences with seaman Small and Boatswain's Mate Samuel Cromwell. Captain Mackenzie confronted Spencer with Wales' allegation that evening. Spencer replied that he told Wales the story as a joke. Spencer was arrested and put in irons on the quarterdeck. Papers written in Greek were discovered in a search of Spencer's locker and translated by Midshipman Henry Rodgers. The papers read:

"CERTAIN: P. Spencer, E. Andrews, D. McKinley, Wales
"DOUBTFUL: Wilson (X), McKee (X), Warner, Green, Gedney, Van Veltzor, Sullivan, Godfrey, Gallia (X), Howard (X)
"Those doubtful marked (X) will probably be induced to join before the project is carried into execution. The remainder of the doubtful will probably join when the thing is done, if not, they must be forced. If any not marked down wish to join after the thing is done we will pick out the best and dispose of the rest.
"NOLENS VOLENS: Sibley, Van Brunt, Blackwell, Clarke, Corney, Garratrantz, Strummond, Witmore, Waltham, Nevilles, Dickinson, Riley, Scott, Crawley, Rodman, Selsor, The Doctor
"Wheel: McKee
"Cabin: Spencer, Small, Wilson
"Wardroom: Spencer
"Steerage: Spencer, Small, Wilson
"Arm Chest: McKinley"

A mast failed and damaged some of the ship's sail rigging on 27 November. The timing and circumstances were regarded as suspicious, and Cromwell, the largest man on the crew, was questioned about his alleged meetings with Spencer. Cromwell said: "It was not me, sir – it was Small." Small was questioned and admitted meeting with Spencer. Both Cromwell and Small joined Spencer in irons on the quarterdeck.

On 28 November, wardroom steward Henry Waltham was flogged for having stolen brandy for Spencer, and, after the flogging, Captain Mackenzie informed the crew of a plot by Spencer to have them murdered. Waltham was flogged again on 29 November for suggesting theft of three bottles of wine to one of the apprentices. Sailmaker's mate Charles A. Wilson was detected attempting to obtain a weapon that afternoon, and Landsman McKinley and Apprentice Green missed muster when their watch was called at midnight.

Four more men were put in irons on the morning of 30 November: Wilson, McKinley, Green, and Cromwell's friend, Alexander McKie. Captain Mackenzie then addressed a letter to his four wardroom officers (First Lieutenant Gansevoort, Passed Assistant Surgeon L.W. Leecock, Purser Heiskell, and Acting Master M.C. Perry) and three oldest midshipmen (Henry Rodgers, Egbert Thompson, and Charles W. Hayes), asking their opinion as to the best course of action. The seven convened in the wardroom to interview members of the crew.

On 1 December, the officers reported that they had "come to a cool, decided, and unanimous opinion" that Spencer, Cromwell, and Small were "guilty of a full and determined intention to commit a mutiny," and they recommended that the three be put to death, despite Spencer's claim that the accused conspirators "had been pretending piracy". The plotters were hanged that day and buried at sea. Some noted that Captain Mackenzie could have waited to take action since the ship was only thirteen days from reaching home port. In response, Mackenzie noted the fatigue of his officers, the ship's small size, and the inadequacies of the confinement as reasons for moving forward with the executions.

Somers reached St. Thomas on 5 December and returned to New York on 14 December. She remained there during a naval court of inquiry that investigated the alleged mutiny and subsequent executions. The court exonerated Mackenzie, as did a subsequent court-martial that was held at his request to avoid a trial in civil court.

However, according to maritime historian Samuel Eliot Morison, false accusations that Mackenzie was an incompetent martinet whose brutality brought on the mutiny continued to appear for years afterwards. Morison attributes the origin of the smear campaign to Whig politics, and a print vendetta by novelist James Fenimore Cooper, because Mackenzie and others had published articles criticizing Cooper's history of the Battle of Lake Erie.

== In the Home Squadron ==
On 20 March 1843, Lt. John West assumed command of Somers and the brig was assigned to the Home Squadron. For the next few years, she served along the Atlantic coast and in the West Indies.

== Mexican–American War ==
Somers was in the Gulf of Mexico off Veracruz at the opening of the Mexican–American War in the spring of 1846, and, except for runs to Pensacola, Florida, for logistics, remained in that area on blockade duty until the winter. On the evening of 26 November, the brig, commanded by Lt. Raphael Semmes (later the celebrated commanding officer of the Confederate commerce raider CSS Alabama), was blockading Veracruz when the Mexican schooner Criolla slipped into that port. Somers launched a boat party that boarded and captured the schooner. However, a calm wind prevented the Americans from getting their prize out to sea, so they set fire to the vessel and returned through gunfire from the shore to Somers, bringing back seven prisoners. Unfortunately, Criolla proved to be a US spy ship operating for Commodore David Conner.

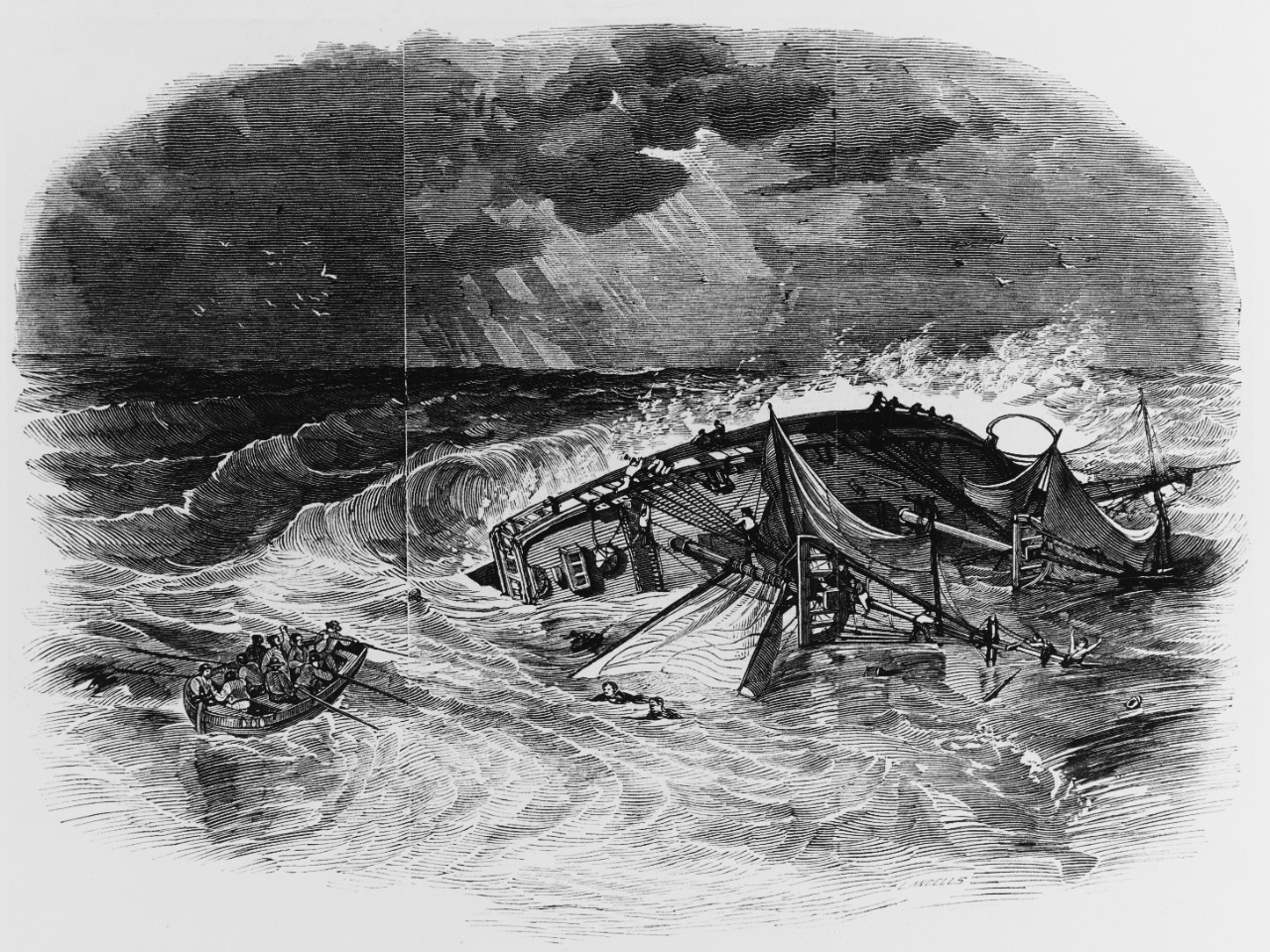
Loss of USS Somers off Veracruz

On 8 December 1846, while chasing a blockade runner off Veracruz, Somers capsized and foundered in a sudden squall. Thirty-six of her 80 crew were lost. Eight survivors were rescued by HMS Endymion. Eight more swam to shore and were taken prisoner. English and French vessels rescued the other survivors. On 3 March 1847, Congress authorized gold and silver medals to the officers and men of French, British, and Spanish ships-of-war who aided in the rescue.

== Legacy and wreck ==
Herman Melville – whose first cousin, Lt. Guert Gansevoort, was an officer aboard the brig at the time of the Somers Affair – may have been influenced by the notorious events involving the Somers mutineers. Melville may have used elements of the story in his novella Billy Budd.

The incident is detailed in the novel Voyage to the First of December by Henry Carlisle, written from the viewpoint of the naval surgeon on duty (from his old journals). It is also described in detail in the novel The Big Family by Vina Delmar.

The story of the Somers Affair and the subsequent trial is dramatized in the penultimate episode of the sixth season of the television series JAG. The presentation takes place as a dream by Lt. Col. Sarah MacKenzie, while she prepares to give a lecture at the United States Naval Academy, which came into existence as a result of the Somers Affair. The regular cast portrayed the people involved. Trevor Goddard played the role of Mackenzie, and Catherine Bell (in a play on the identical surname of her usual role in JAG) played Mrs. Mackenzie.

In 1986, an expedition led by George Belcher, an art dealer and explorer from San Francisco, California, discovered the wreck, and in 1987 archaeologists James Delgado and Mitchell Marken confirmed the identification of the wreck. In 1990, Delgado, along with Pilar Luna Erreguerena, co-directed a joint Mexican-US expedition, which involved archaeologists and divers from the US National Park Service, the Armada de Mexico, and the Instituto Nacional de Antropología e Historia. The project determined that unknown people had looted the wreck sometime after the 1987 expedition. The wreck remains as a site protected by legislation.

The most notable legacy of the Somers Affair is the US Naval Academy, which was founded as a direct result of the affair. Appalled that a midshipman would consider mutiny, senior naval officials ordered the creation of the academy so that midshipmen could receive a formal and supervised education in naval seamanship and related matters.
