= Chi Psi =

American collegiate fraternity

- ΧΨ
- Founded: May 20, 1841; 185 years ago Union College
- Type: Social
- Affiliation: NIC
- Status: Active
- Scope: National
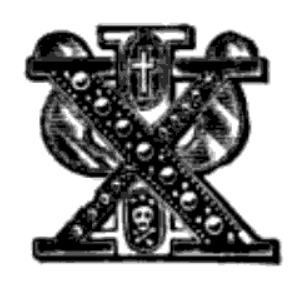
- Member badge
- Colors: Purple and Gold
- Flag
- Publication: The Purple and Gold
- Chapters: 34 active, 15 dormant
- Headquarters: 45 Rutledge Street; Nashville, Tennessee 37210; United States
- Website: www.chipsi.org

Chi Psi (ΧΨ) is a fraternity consisting of active chapters at 34 American colleges and universities. Chi Psi was founded in 1841 at Union College in Schenectady, New York. It was the first Greek-letter organization to be founded on the grounds of fraternal bonds, rather than the literary characteristics of the seven then-existing fraternities.

Chi Psi was the first fraternity in the nation to establish a fraternity house. This was a building at the University of Michigan, which was said to resemble a hunting lodge; hence, Chi Psi now refers to all its houses as lodges.

== History ==
Chi Psi was founded on May 20, 1841, by ten students at Union College. The founding members were Philip Spencer, Robert Heyward McFaddin, Jacob Henry Farrell, John Brush Jr., Samuel Titus Taber, James Lafayette Witherspoon, William Force Terhune, Alexander Peter Berthoud, James Chatham Duane, and Patrick Upshaw Major.

Chi Psi was founded as a brotherhood that embraces related values that were adopted at its founding in 1841. A revision of the values was adopted at 122nd National Convention in 1963. Chi Psi also embraces the idea of being a true gentleman, by following the definition of a gentleman as put forward by John Walter Wayland's "The True Gentleman":

The True Gentleman is the man whose conduct proceeds from goodwill and an acute sense of propriety and whose self-control is equal to all emergencies; who does not make the poor man conscious of his poverty, the obscure man of his obscurity, or any man of his inferiority or deformity; who is himself humbled if necessity compels him to humble another; who does not flatter wealth, cringe before power, or boast of his own possessions or achievements; who speaks with frankness but always with sincerity and sympathy; whose deed follows his word; who thinks of the rights and feelings of others rather than his own; and who appears well in any company; a man with whom honor is sacred and virtue safe.

In 1846, Chi Psi was the first fraternity in the nation to establish a fraternity house. This was a building at the University of Michigan, which was said to resemble a hunting lodge; hence, Chi Psi now refers to all its chapter houses as lodges. The Chi Psi newsletter, The Purple & Gold, was first published in November 1883, and was named for the fraternity's official colors. The fraternity's national headquarters is in Nashville, Tennessee.

== Activities ==
The Chi Psi Educational Trust has funded the Program for Excellence, consisting of workshops that instill the fraternity's members with a respect for themselves, the people they are around, and their community.

== Chapters ==
Chi Psi refers to its chapters as Alphas.

== Leadership ==
=== President ===
The national President of Chi Psi is known as the #7. The first #7 was elected in 1879, thirty-eight years after the founding of Chi Psi. The #7's are:

| President (#7) | Alpha | Initiation Year | Term Start | Term End |
|---|---|---|---|---|
| Dr. Stephen H. Tyng Jr. | Theta | 1858 | 1879 | 1882 |
| Elbridge Thomas Gerry | Zeta | 1857 | 1882 | 1914 |
| Edward C. Swift | Epsilon | 1878 | 1914 | 1919 |
| Albert S. Bard | Chi | 1888 | 1919 | 1921 |
| Vojta F. Mashek | Psi | 1889 | 1921 | 1923 |
| John Wendell Anderson | Epsilon | 1890 | 1923 | 1930 |
| Vojta F. Mashek | Psi | 1889 | 1930 | 1934 |
| Frank Matthiessen | Psi | 1895 | 1934 | 1936 |
| Vojta F. Mashek | Psi | 1889 | 1936 | 1940 |
| Charles E. Merrill | Chi | 1908 | 1940 | 1949 |
| Clifford H. Williams | Theta | 1902 | 1949 | 1952 |
| John P. Mentzer | Epsilon Delta | 1889 | 1952 | 1955 |
| Harold S. Falk | Iota | 1906 | 1955 | 1958 |
| Stanley J. Birge | Chi | 1908 | 1958 | 1961 |
| H. Seger Slifer | Epsilon | 1912 | 1961 | 1967 |
| Temple Hoyne Buell | Zeta Delta | 1916 | 1967 | 1973 |
| Nelson T. Levings | Omicron | 1926 | 1973 | 1977 |
| Oliver R. Rowe | Sigma | 1925 | 1977 | 1985 |
| Robert B. Plunkett | Iota Delta | 1933 | 1985 | 1988 |
| F. Van S. Parr | Alpha | 1929 | 1988 | 1990 |
| Carleton A. Holstrom | Iota | 1957 | 1990 | 1992 |
| Robert C. Preble Jr. | Chi | 1944 | 1992 | 1995 |
| Dr. George W. Ray III | Alpha | 1954 | 1995 | 2001 |
| Malcolm D. Jeffrey | Theta | 1954 | 2001 | 2004 |
| Dr. Daniel B. Ahlberg | Nu | 1967 | 2005 | 2014 |
| Verne G. Istock | Epsilon | 1963 | 2014 | 2019 |
| W. S. "Bill" Hattendorf J. | Alpha Delta | 1969 | 2019 | 2026 |

=== Executive Director ===
The executive director of Chi Psi is known as the #23. The first #23 was appointed in 1921. The #23's are:

| Executive Director (#23) | Alpha | Initiation Year | Term Start | Term End |
|---|---|---|---|---|
| H. Seger Slifer | Epsilon | 1912 | 1921 | 1961 |
| William E. LeClere | Beta Delta | 1957 | 1961 | 1967 |
| James E. Bray | Epsilon Delta | 1963 | 1967 | 1970 |
| Richard D. Elliott | Beta | 1967 | 1970 | 1972 |
| T. Lee Pomeroy II | Chi | 1971 | 1972 | 1979 |
| W. S. "Bill" Hattendorf Jr. | Alpha Delta | 1969 | 1978 | 1983 |
| Herbert P. Carroll | Epsilon | 1945 | 1983 | 1988 |
| Michael C. Illuzzi | Rho | 1977 | 1988 | 1994 |
| Philip L. Smith | Sigma | 1964 | 1994 | 1995 |
| Donald E. Kreger | Epsilon Delta | 1951 | 1996 | 1998 |
| Stephen Gardner | Nu | 1987 | 1998 | 2000 |
| Robert K. Windsor | Eta | 1955 | 2000 | 2002 |
| Samuel C. Bessey | Eta Delta | 1997 | 2002 | 2022 |
| Harold G. Arnwine | Tau Delta | 1986 | 2022 | 2024 |
| Kyle D. Phillips | Pi Delta | 2016 | 2024 | present |

== Chapter or member misconduct ==
A pledge named Gordie Bailey died of an alcohol overdose at University of Colorado Boulder in 2004. He was found face down on the floor of the Chi Psi house, where members had drawn slurs all over his body while he was passed out. The Chi Psi chapter was temporarily suspended. A 2017 USA Today article used Bailey's death to illustrate that fraternity chapters frequently continue operations with little interruption after a death.

In 1971, Chi Psi at the University of Virginia conducted a staged lynching with a group of black-hooded students with rifles surrounding a black-faced mannequin swinging from a tree. A photograph of the spectacle was published in the university's yearbook, where it was rediscovered by journalists at The Cavalier Daily in 2019. The Frank Zappa quote, "You know I'm not black, but there's a whole lot of times I wish'd I wasn't white", was displayed on the opposing page and was part of the Chi Psi yearbook entry. So, the objectionable photo, combined with the quote, appears to have been a poorly executed attempt at condemnation of racism and violence against blacks.

== See also ==
- List of social fraternities
