= Elisha Small =

American sailor

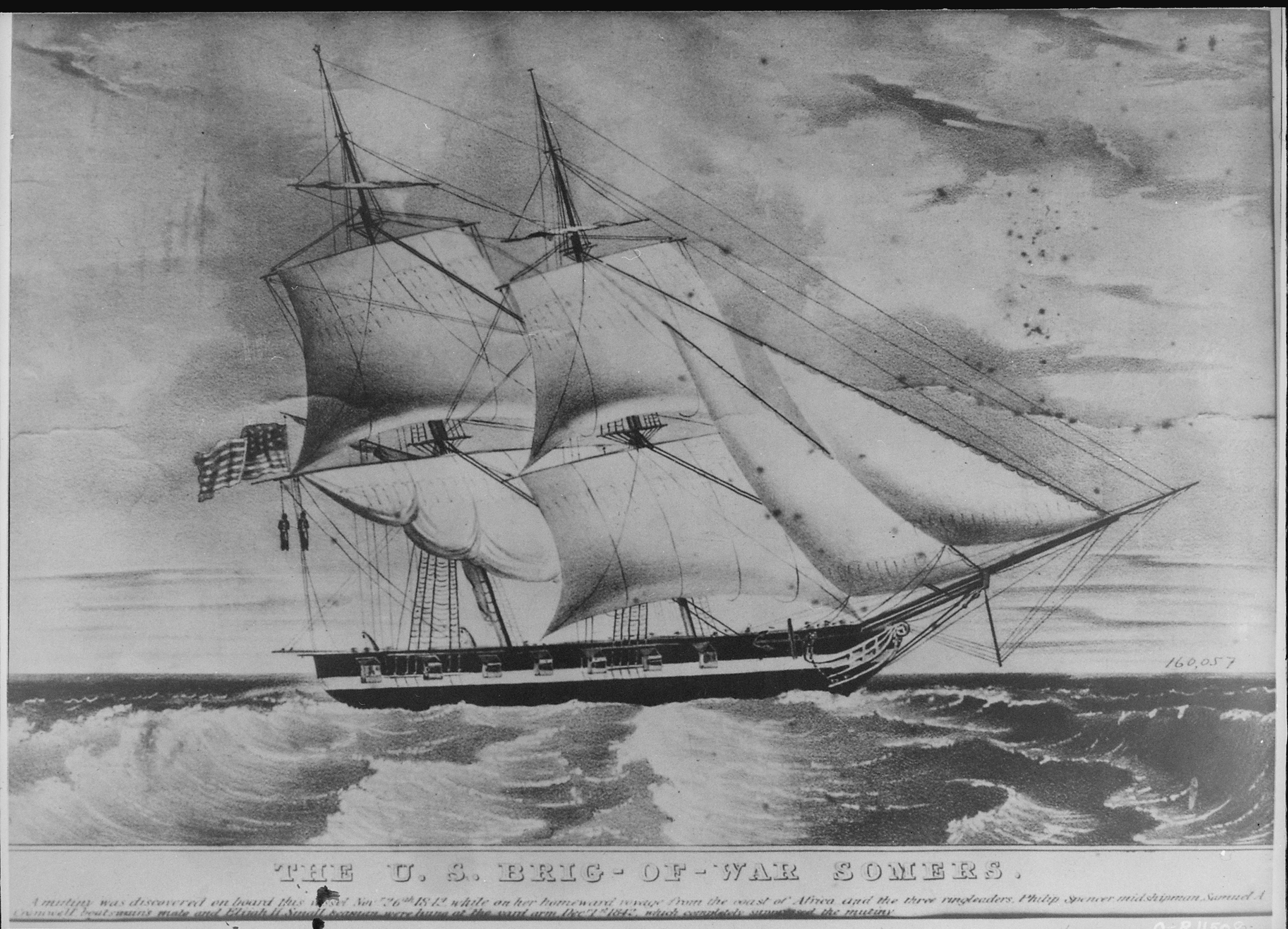
- USS Somers, 1842 lithograph men hanging from yardarm
- Born: Unknown
- Died: December 1, 1842 at sea, aboard USS Somers
- Cause of death: Execution by hanging
- Occupation: Sailor

Elisha Small (died December 1, 1842) was an American sailor who was sailing with the rank of Seaman. He had served on several kinds of ships, including, allegedly, a slave ship, before joining the United States Navy.

In November 1842, while serving aboard the brig USS Somers, during the return home from a voyage to Liberia, suspicion arose that Philip Spencer had formed a plan to seize the Somers and sail her as a pirate ship or slaver. His friendship with crew members Samuel Cromwell and Elisha Small was cited as evidence. On November 27, 1842, Small and Cromwell were formally accused of being part of Spencer's supposed plot to mutiny. After a council of officers decided that the threat of mutiny was real, all three men were hanged without court-martial on December 1 and were buried at sea.

A court of inquiry was convened when the brig returned to New York. After a month of testimony, the commander was exonerated, but he requested that he be charged and tried by a court martial. The court martial acquitted him on a split vote. The government accepted the court's decision, but the acquittal did not satisfy public concerns with the case. Many commentators, including James Fenimore Cooper, denounced the hangings as murder and criticized the Navy's handling of the matter as an example of what today could be called a "whitewash."
