= Samuel Cromwell =

American sailor and mutineer

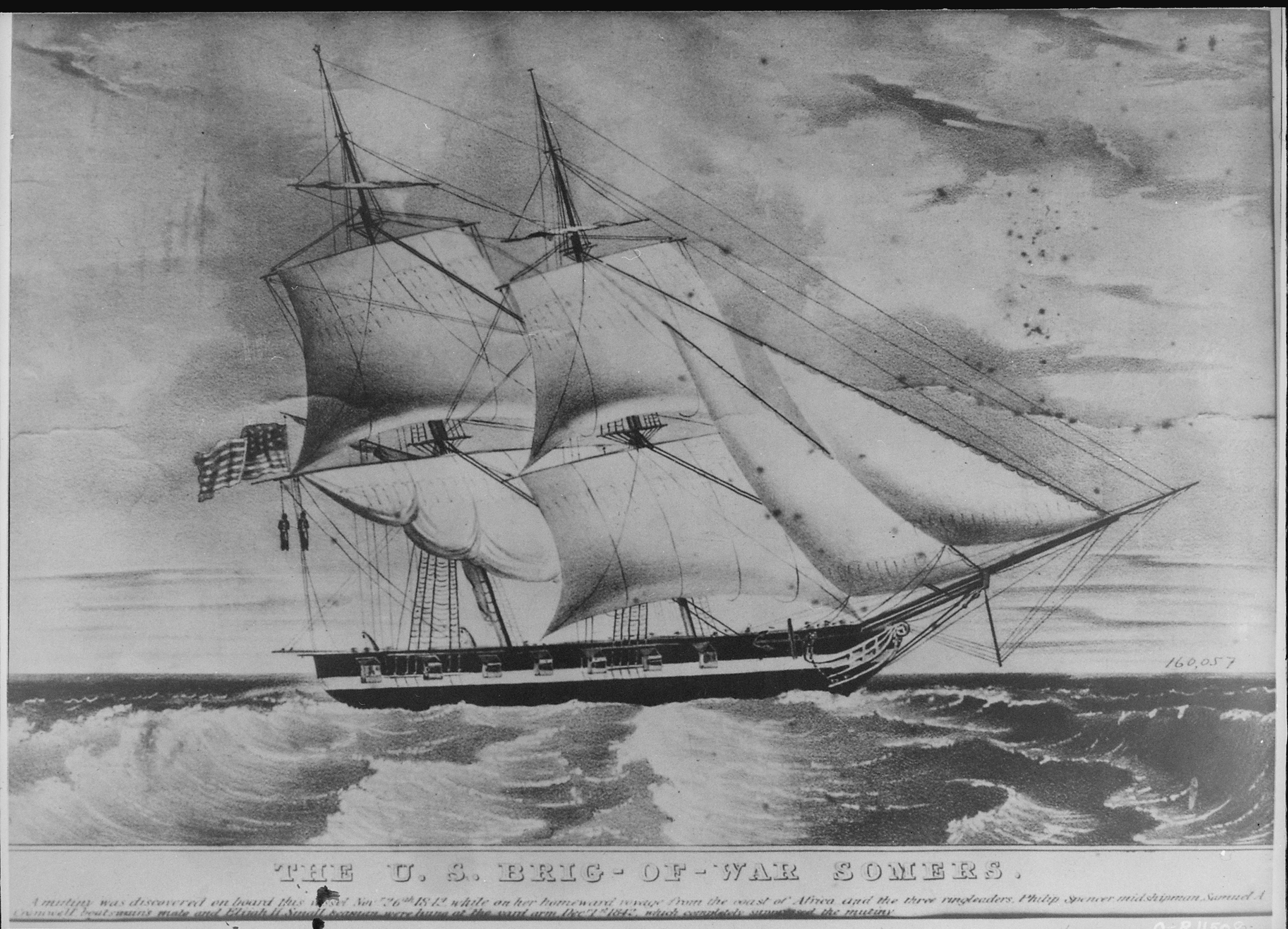
- USS Somers, 1842 lithograph men hanging from yardarm
- Born: Unknown; Unknown
- Died: December 1, 1842 asea, aboard USS Somers
- Occupation: Boatswain's Mate (United States Navy)

Samuel Cromwell (died December 1, 1842) was a sailor and petty officer (boatswain's mate) aboard the brig USS Somers. Cromwell was feared by the young apprentices who made up the majority of the ship's crew, and was rumored to have served on a slaver at one time. These rumors lent credence to the idea that he would have been amenable to Philip Spencer's alleged plot to mutiny, kill the ship's officers and such of the crew as were not wanted and sail the Somers either as a pirate ship or a slaver.

On the homeward leg of a voyage to Liberia, Cromwell was put in irons a few days after Spencer and Elisha Small, another sailor rumored to have been part of a slave ship's crew. After a meeting of the officers concluded that a mutinous plot existed, all three men were hanged without a court-martial.
