= Hengchun (disambiguation) =

Hengchun is a township in Pingtung County, Taiwan. Hengchun may also refer to:

- Hengchun Airport, an airport
- Hengchun Old Town, a historic site

== See also ==
- Hengchun earthquake (disambiguation)
