= Hengchun line =

Planned branch line of the Taiwan Railway

Overview
- Native name: 恆春線
- Status: Planned, expected to finish in mid-2020s
- Owner: Taiwan Railway Administration
- Locale: Hengchun, Pingtung County, Taiwan
- Termini: Xinzuoying; Hengchun

Service
- Type: Heavy rail
- System: Taiwan Railway

Technical
- Track gauge: 3 ft 6 in (1,067 mm) narrow gauge

The Hengchun line (Chinese: 恆春線; Pe̍h-ōe-jī: Hêng-chhun Sòaⁿ) is a planned branch line of Taiwan Railway South-link line which plans to connect Taiwan's southern capital Kaohsiung to Kenting, a popular tourist destination located in Hengchun. Express train service that connects Xinzuoying Station, the major hub for both Taiwan High Speed Rail and Taiwan Railway trains, to Hengchun is also planned. Construction started in 2017.

== History ==
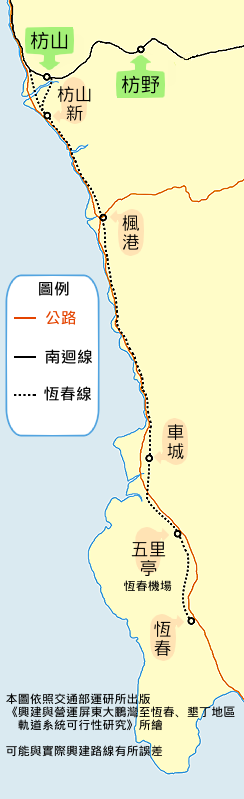
Hengchun line route map

In 1876, the governor of Fujian Province Ding Ri-chang (zh) proposed a railway line running from Keelung to Hengchun, and under a 1924 plan proposed during Japanese rule, the Hengchun line was planned to branch off from the Pingtung line, but that plan was shelved in 1927 due to budgetary constraints.

The need to construct the Hengchun line became apparent with the opening of Kenting National Park in 1984 as well as the fact that Hengchun Airport (opened in 2004) is often affected by strong winds. The washing away of several bridges of Provincial Highway 1 during Typhoon Haitang in 2005 further highlighted the importance of the need for the Hengchun line. In 2002 a feasibility study was completed, but in 2005 the Ministry of Transportation and Communications (MOTC) recommended that coach transportation be used entirely from Fangliao railway station to Kenting National Park. After further lobbying from Hengchun residents, the MOTC conducted a revised feasibility study in 2014, this time including express service using TRA rolling stock from Xinzuoying Station to Hengchun Station. The latter study was approved by the Executive Yuan in December 2015. Construction started in 2017, and it is expected to finish in the mid-2020s. A branch line leading to the National Museum of Marine Biology and Aquarium is currently under discussion.

== Stations ==
Name	Chinese	Taiwanese	Hakka	Transfers and notes	Location	
Neishi	內獅	Lāi-sai	Nui-sṳ̂	→ South-link line	Fangshan	Pingtung; County
Fangshanxin	枋山新	Pang-soaⁿ-sin	Piông-sân-sîn		Fangshan	Pingtung; County
Fenggang	楓港	Hong-káng	Pùng-kóng		Fangshan	Pingtung; County
Checheng	車城	Chhia-siâⁿ	Chhâ-sàng		Checheng	Pingtung; County
Wuliting	五里亭	Gō͘-lí-tîng	Ńg-lí-tin	Hengchun Airport (HCN)	Hengchun	Pingtung; County
Hengchun	恆春	Hêng-chhun	Hèn-tshûn		Hengchun	Pingtung; County
