= 1959 Coatzacoalcos earthquake =

Earthquake in Mexico

- Location within Mexico
- UTC time: 1959-08-26 08:25:37
- ISC event: 882734
- USGS-ANSS: ComCat
- Local date: August 26, 1959
- Local time: 02:25:37 CST
- Magnitude: 6.4 M_{w}
- Depth: 21.0 km (13 mi)
- Epicenter: 18.22°N 94.42°W
- Type: Thrust
- Areas affected: Mexico
- Max. intensity: MMI VIII (Severe)
- Aftershocks: August 26: 9:00 a.m., noon, 9:30 p.m. August 27: 3:45 a.m.
- Casualties: 25 dead, 200 injured

The 1959 Coatzacoalcos earthquake (also known as the Jáltipan earthquake) occurred at 02:25 local time on August 26 near the Mexican state of Veracruz. The earthquake measured 6.4 M_{w} at a depth of 21 km (13 mi), and had a maximum Modified Mercalli intensity of VIII (Severe). It had an epicenter immediately off the coast of Coatzacoalcos (in the Gulf of Mexico). The shallow back-arc thrust faulting earthquake damaged the cities of Acayucan, Coatzacoalcos, Jáltipan and Minatitlán. A total of 25 people died, including 10 from Jáltipan while a further 200 were injured. The Middle America Trench, a subduction zone that borders the southwestern coast of Mexico and Central America, accounts for much of the seismicity in Mexico. The eastern side of the country near the Gulf of Mexico rarely experiences large earthquakes although they have been recorded around the Veracruz area, where seismicity is higher compared to other parts of the gulf. Seismicity in the gulf is attributed to back-arc compression due to subduction.

== Tectonic setting ==
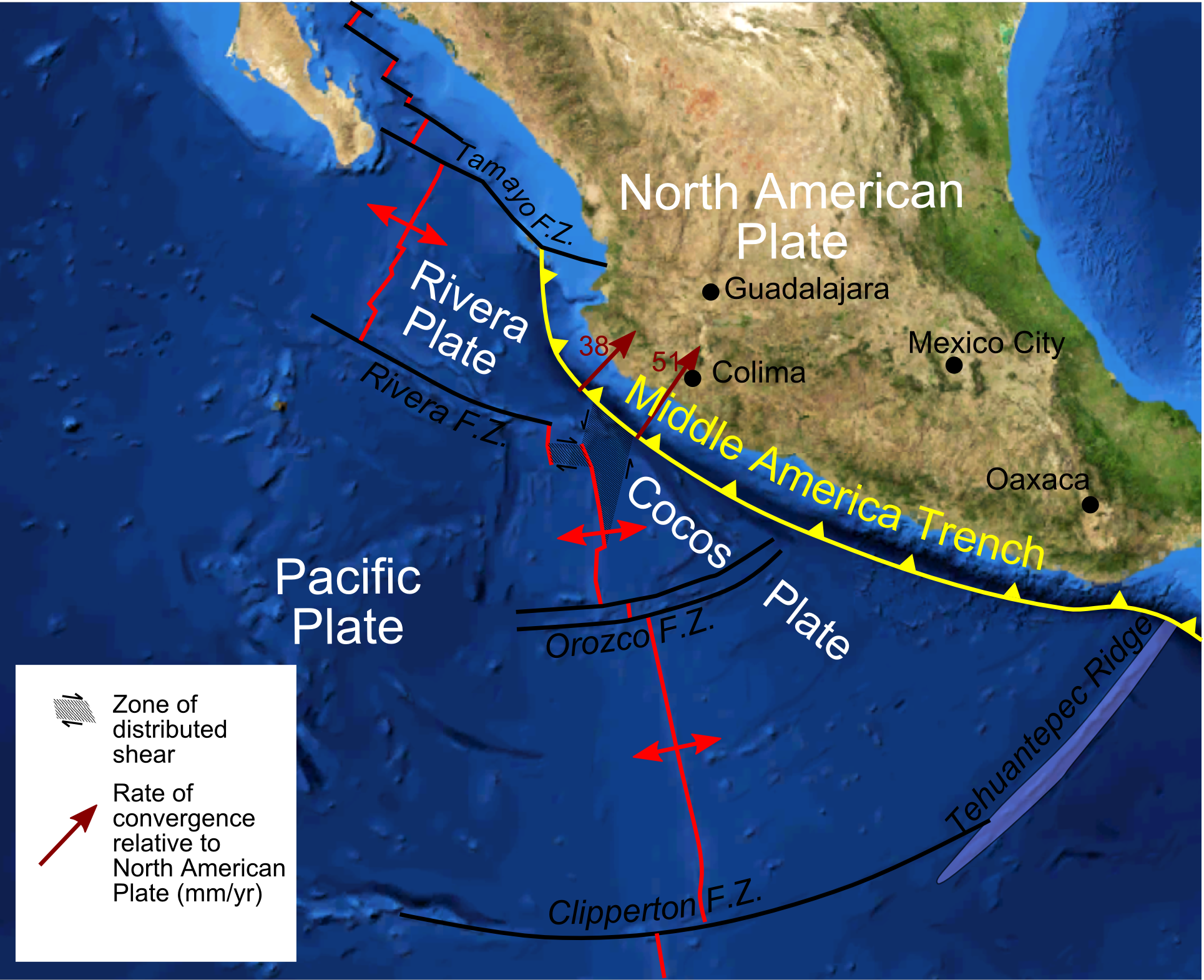
The subduction zone off Mexico's Pacific coast.

Mexico is one of the most seismically active regions in the world; located at the boundary of at least three tectonic plates. The west coast of Mexico lies at a convergent plate boundary between the Cocos plate and North American plate. The Cocos plate, consisting of denser oceanic lithosphere, subducts to the northeast beneath the less dense continental crust of the North American plate. Most of the Mexican landmass is situated on the North American plate and is moving westward. Because oceanic crust is relatively dense it subducts beneath the buoyant continental crust of the Mexican landmass. Subduction off the Pacific coast of Mexico occurs along the Middle America Trench along the southern coast of Mexico. The subduction zone is seismically active and responsible for large earthquakes—a magnitude 8.1 earthquake in 1985 caused over 9,500 fatalities.

== Earthquake ==
The earthquake had a focal mechanism corresponding to thrust faulting at a depth of 21 km (13 mi). The source fault is characterized by a high-angle plane oriented parallel to the Veracruz coast. A similar earthquake in the same area in 1967 demonstrated thrust faulting mechanism at 26 km (16 mi) depth. In 1946, a magnitude 6.0 also struck the same place with a similar focal mechanism. These earthquakes are not associated with rupture on the subduction zone off Mexico's west coast. The focal depth of these events are unusually deep for most intracontinental earthquakes, where the depth is usually shallower than 15 km (9.3 mi). This suggests the earthquakes occurred inside the mantle, beneath the 20 km (12 mi)-thick transitional crust.

The Gulf of Mexico, where the Jáltipan earthquake occurred, is a region of low seismicity. This area represents a passive margin and is considered aseismic. At the Isthmus of Tehuantepec, intermediate-depth earthquakes associated with the subducting Cocos plate are common. However, there is a region of shallow seismicity around Veracruz and Tabasco in the southwestern part of the gulf where earthquakes are of low magnitude. Shallow seismic activity on the isthmus is associated with back-arc compression within the shallow crust. Deformation of the crust is accommodated by crustal shortening on thrust faults. This compressive force is brought on by west coast subduction, as well as subduction of the Tehuantepec Ridge.

== Damage ==
The combined effects of structural or foundation failure and soil liquefaction earned the earthquake a maximum Modified Mercalli intensity of VIII (Severe) in Jáltipan, Coatzacoalcos and Minatitlán. Building failures occurred at Coatzacoalcos and Minatitlán. Ground subsidence due to liquefaction was observed at the port of Coatzacoalcos.

Altogether, 450 homes and other dwellings, a school, two churches and a railroad station were total losses. Twenty-five people died and 200 were injured. Jáltipan was nearly destroyed—10 people were killed and 138 were injured—including 45 in serious condition. A navy workshop in Coatzacoalcos subsided by a meter, cracking its floor. Petrol storage facilities at the port were damaged. A highway and the city streets suffered cracks. The tower of the San Francisco de Asís church was severely compromised and needed to be demolished. In Minatitlán, an oil pipeline ruptured and spilled. In Acayucan, 20 percent of the city's buildings were demolished and there were 20 wounded. The highway between Coatzacoalcos and Minatitlán were filled with cracks up to 2 m (6 ft 7 in) wide and deep. From Santa Marta, residents reported a large flame towering 60 m (200 ft) over the Sierra de los Tuxtlas range.

== Aftermath ==
Volunteers rushed to the fire brigade in response to those injured and to remove bodies from the rubble. Ambulances from Red Cross organizations arrived shortly. The Governor of Veracruz, Antonio Modesto Quirasco, along with members of his cabinet, arrived at Jáltipan on the night of August 26. An establishment (Patronato Pro Recuperación Social de Jáltipan) was formed to help raise funds for the reconstruction of Jáltipan. The representative of President Adolfo López Mateos, Fernando López Arias, arrived the following day to overlook and manage reconstruction projects. Many socialites contributed to food distribution.

== See also ==
- List of earthquakes in 1959
- List of earthquakes in Mexico
