= Kenting National Forest Recreation Area =

Forest in Hengchun, Pingtung County, Taiwan

Kenting National Forest Recreation Area Chinese: 墾丁國家森林遊樂區
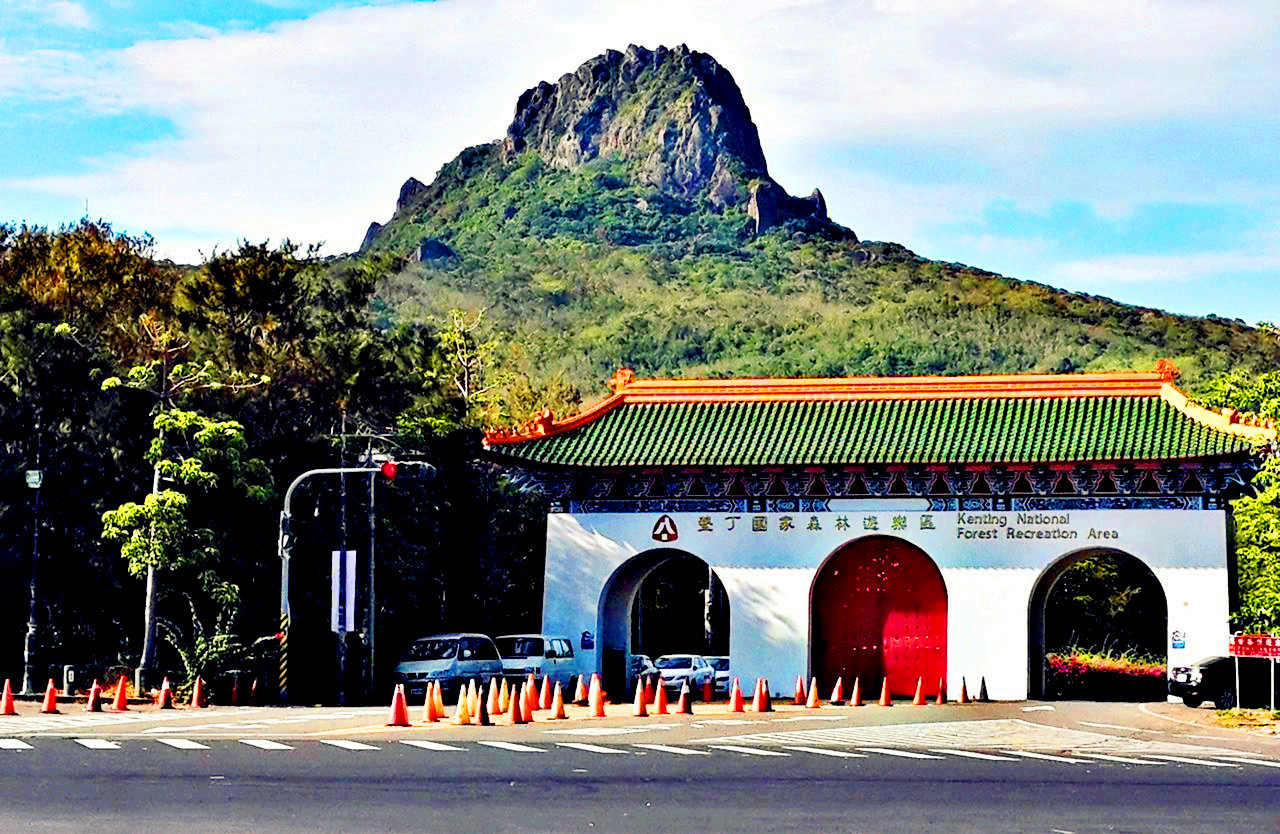

- Location within Pingtung County
- Interactive map of Kenting National Forest Recreation Area

Geography
- Location: Hengchun, Pingtung County, Taiwan
- Coordinates: 21°57′31.5″N 120°48′42.7″E
- Elevation: 300 m (980 ft)
- Area: 150 ha (370 acres)

Administration
- Established: 1906 (as Hengchun Tropical Botanical Garden); 1967 (as Kenting National Forest Recreation Area)

Ecology
- Fauna: 1,000 tropical plants

Kenting National Forest Recreation Area (traditional Chinese: 墾丁國家森林遊樂區; simplified Chinese: 垦丁国家森林游乐区; pinyin: Kěndīng Guójiā Sēnlín Yóulè Qū) is a forest in Hengchun Township, Pingtung County, Taiwan. It is park of Kenting National Park.

== History ==
The area used to be filled with coral reefs hundred of thousands of years ago. Later on, the area experienced tectonic uplift and was covered with thin layer of soil. Because of continuous erosion from the weather, reef landscape with limestone caves, cliffs, canyons and other geological formations were formed.

The forest was originally established as Hengchun Tropical Botanical Garden in 1906 by the Japanese government. Later on after that, the area became the Kueizhijiao Tropical Botanical Garden which was supervised by Hengchun Center of Forestry Research Institute. In 1967, the botanical garden was changed to a forest recreation area to promote tourism under Forestry Bureau. In 1969, the forest was opened to the public.

== Geology ==
The forest spans over an area of 150 hectares at an elevation of 300 meters. It has a temperature range between 20.4°C and 27.8°C and annual average rainfall of 2,200 mm. It consists of several caves, which are Fairy Cave and Silver Dragon Cave.

== Architecture ==
The forest consists of 17 scenic sports which are linked together by walkways. There is a 27-meter high observation tower and the visitor center which consists of the presentation room and cafeteria.

== Transportation ==
The forest is accessible by bus from Zuoying Station of Taiwan High Speed Rail.

== See also ==
- Geography of Taiwan
