= Kenting Youth Activity Center =

Accommodation in Hengchun, Pingtung County, Taiwan

- 救國團墾丁青年活動中心
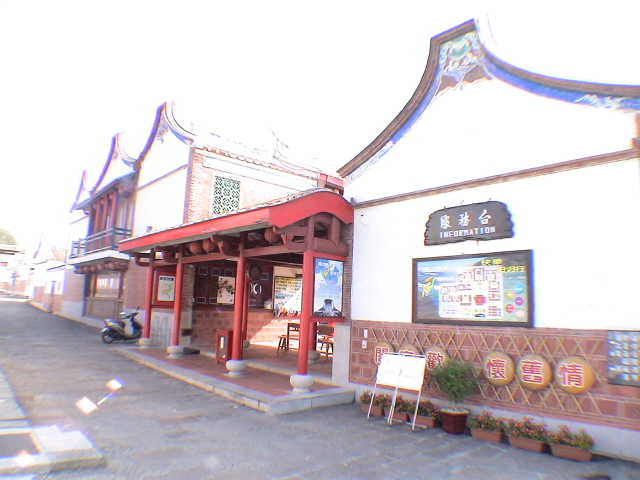
- Interactive map of the Kenting Youth Activity Center area

General information
- Architectural style: Southern Min
- Location: Hengchun, Pingtung County, Taiwan
- Coordinates: 21°56′25.8″N 120°47′57.8″E

Technical details
- Floor area: 15 hectares

Design and construction
- Architect: Han Bao-de

Website
- Official website (in Chinese)

The Kenting Youth Activity Center (traditional Chinese: 救國團墾丁青年活動中心; simplified Chinese: 救国团垦丁青年活动中心; pinyin: Jiùguó Tuán Kěndīng Qīngnián Huódòng Zhōngxīn) is an accommodation covering several buildings in Hengchun Township, Pingtung County, Taiwan.

== Architecture ==
The buildings cover a total area of 15 hectares. It was design by architect Han Pao-Teh, with Southern Min style. The center opened in August 1983. The entrance to the area features gardens, courtyards and lotus ponds. The buildings are currently operated for accommodation. It consists of a total 112 rooms which can house up to 360 people at one time. It also has a restaurant and a hall that can be used for meeting or party up to 400 people.

== Transportation ==
The building can be accessed by bus from Kaohsiung or Pingtung City to Kenting or Eluanbi.

== See also ==
- List of tourist attractions in Taiwan
