= Hengchun earthquake =

Hengchun earthquake may refer to:

- 1959 Hengchun earthquake
- 2006 Hengchun earthquakes
