= Hengchun Old City Wall =

Historical site in Hengchun, Pingtung, Taiwan

Coordinates: 22.004°N 120.7453°E

- 恆春縣城 (Chinese)
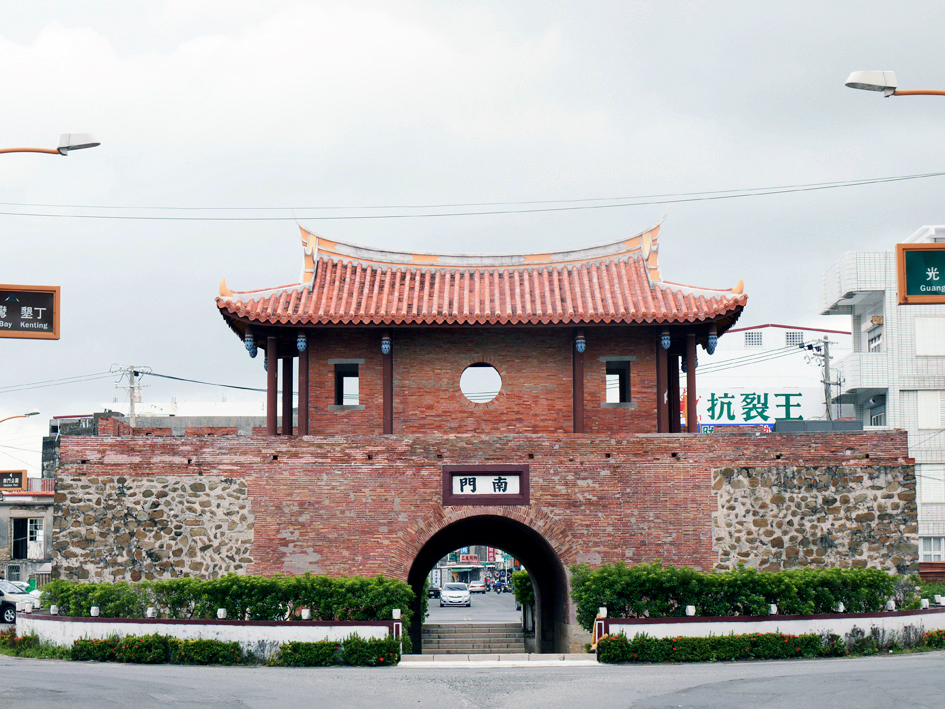
- The south gate of the fort
- Interactive map of Hengchun Old City Wall
- Type: City walls
- Location: Hengchun, Pingtung, Taiwan

History
- Built: 1879; 147 years ago

Hengchun Old City Wall (traditional Chinese: 恆春縣城; simplified Chinese: 恒春县城; pinyin: Héngchūn Xiànchéng) refers to the historic castle town of Hengchun, Pingtung, Taiwan. The town is known for its well-preserved city walls that surround the city, and is the only castle town in Taiwan where all of the original gates remain standing. It is protected as a national historical site.

== History ==
During the Qing dynasty, the area that is modern-day Hengchun was governed as part of Fengshan County. However, being a distant and sparsely populated region, the Qing found it hard to govern the area. Things took a turn following the Rover incident and the Mudan incident, causing the Qing government to decide to maintain a stronger presence in the area. Shen Baozhen, originally dispatched to Hengchun after the Mudan incident, suggested that a fort be built in the area and named it "Hengchun", meaning "constantly spring", referring to the region's fair weather. Construction ran between 1875 and 1879 and was designed by Liu Ao, who would later design the Walls of Taipei. When completed, Hengchun became the seat of the newly-founded Hengchun County.

Since its founding, the fort was damaged multiple times. A typhoon in 1908 caused severe damage to the wooden gatehouses, and large parts of the walls were further damaged during World War Two and the 1959 Hengchun earthquake. Additionally, parts of the wall were removed to construct roads, leaving only portions of the wall near the north and east gates still standing. The castle was first protected as a national historical site in 1979, and the Tourism Bureau began repairs to the south and east gates in 1979 and 1986, respectively, including building replica gatehouses above both gates. However, termites in the east gatehouse caused it to collapse again.

== Structure ==
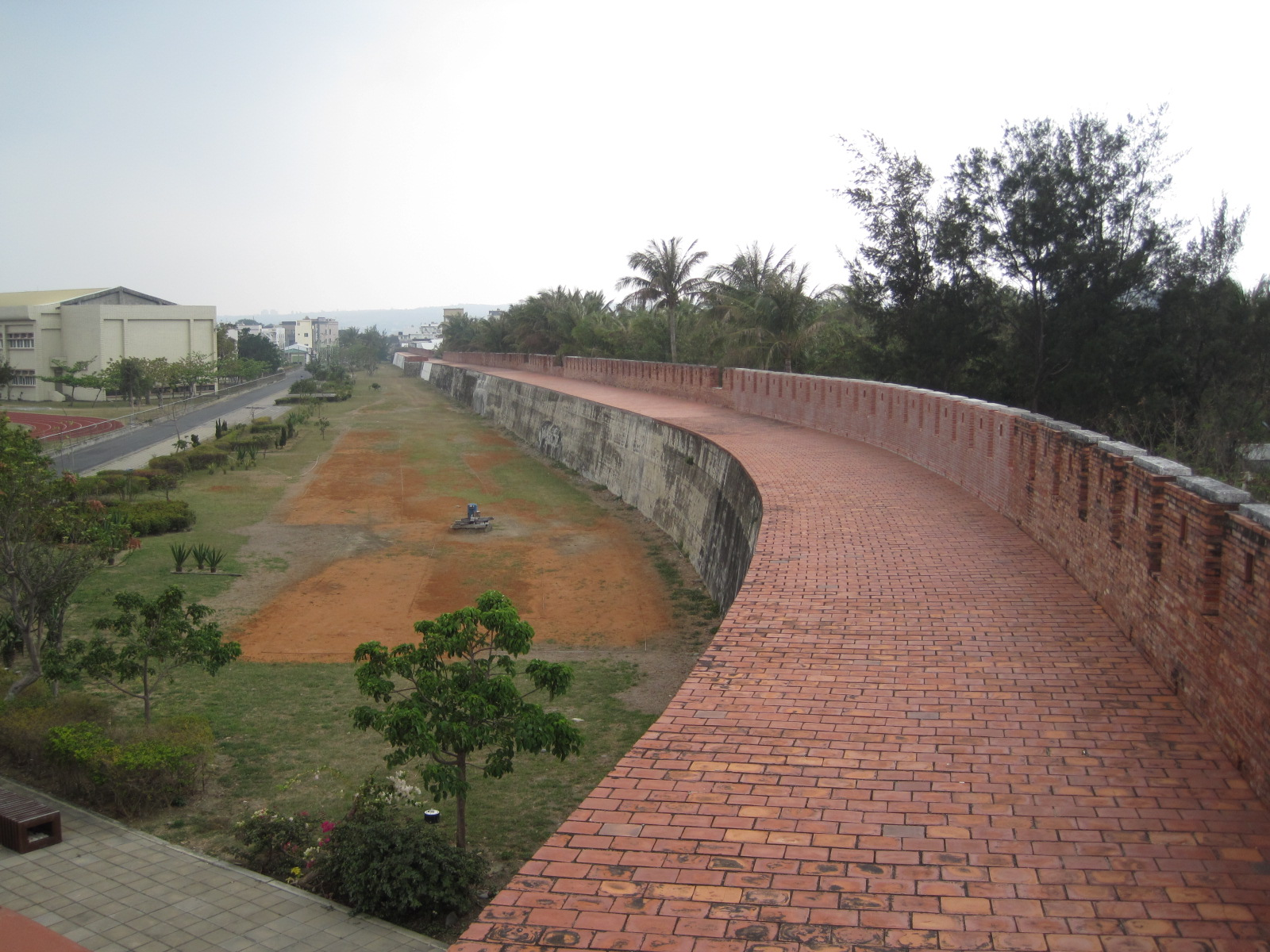
A stretch of castle wall between the north and west gates.

The original fort contained four gates, one in each cardinal direction (except the west gate, which faced northwest). Each gate featured a gatehouse and cannons. The southern gate was named the "Mingdu Gate" (明都門), while the remaining gates were left unnamed. The walls were 2.6 km long and surrounded the entire town, which was then surrounded by a moat. Within the walls, civilians typically resided near the south and west gates, while a military barrack occupied the northern half of the town.

Currently, while all four gates remain standing, only portions of the wall remain near the north and east gates. The south gate sits within a roundabout on the town's major thoroughfare.

== Gallery ==
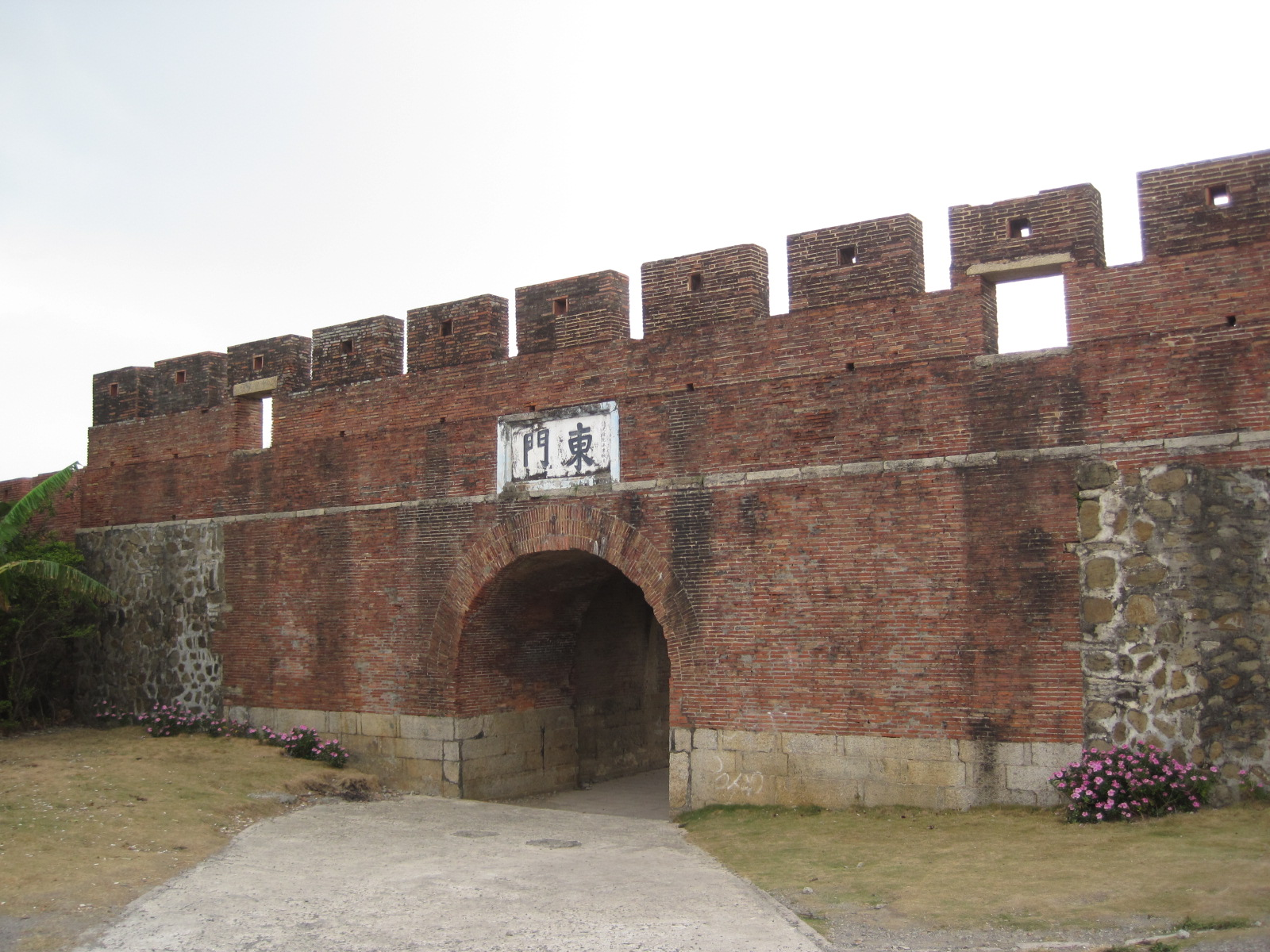
East gate

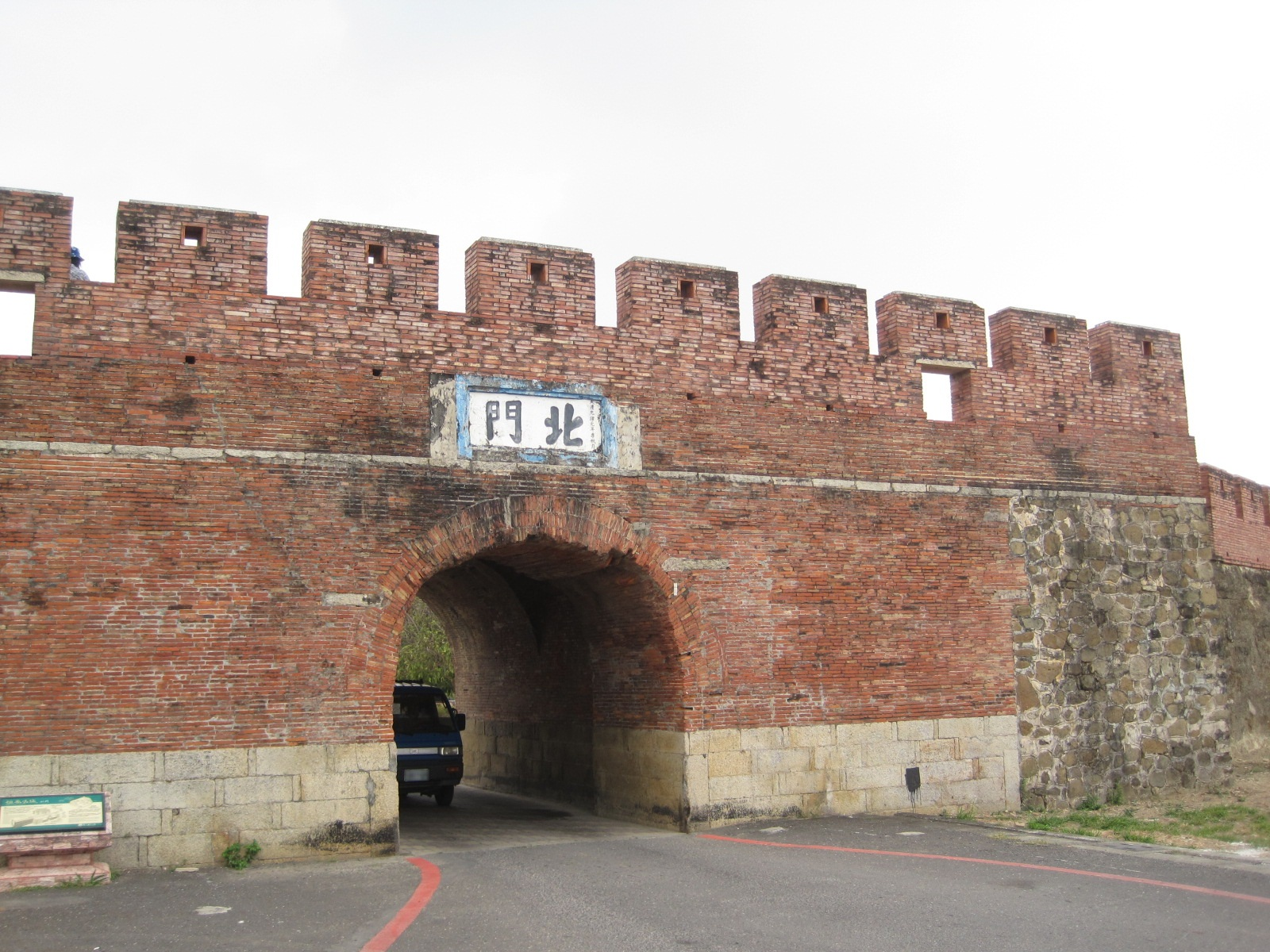
North gate

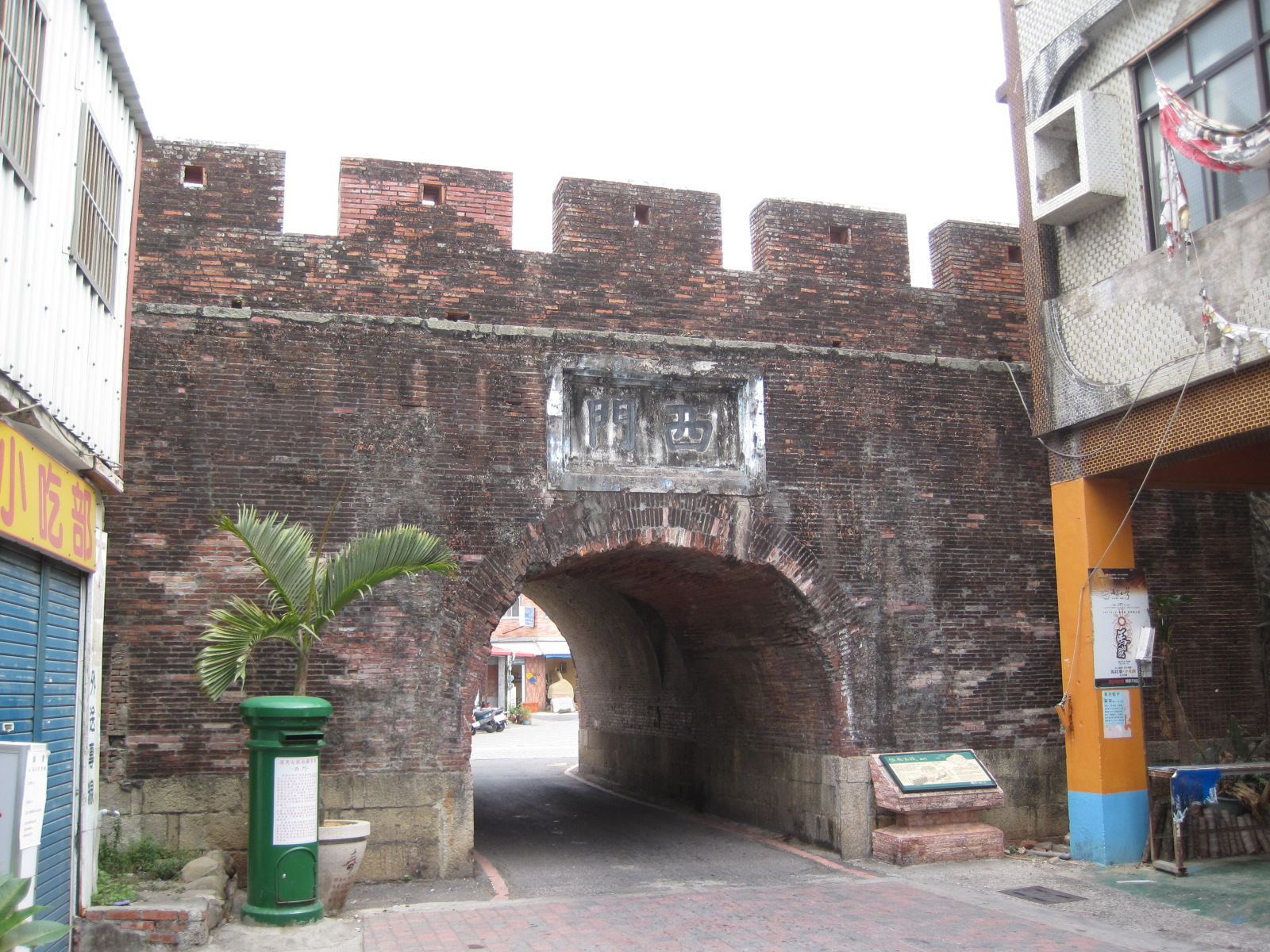
West gate

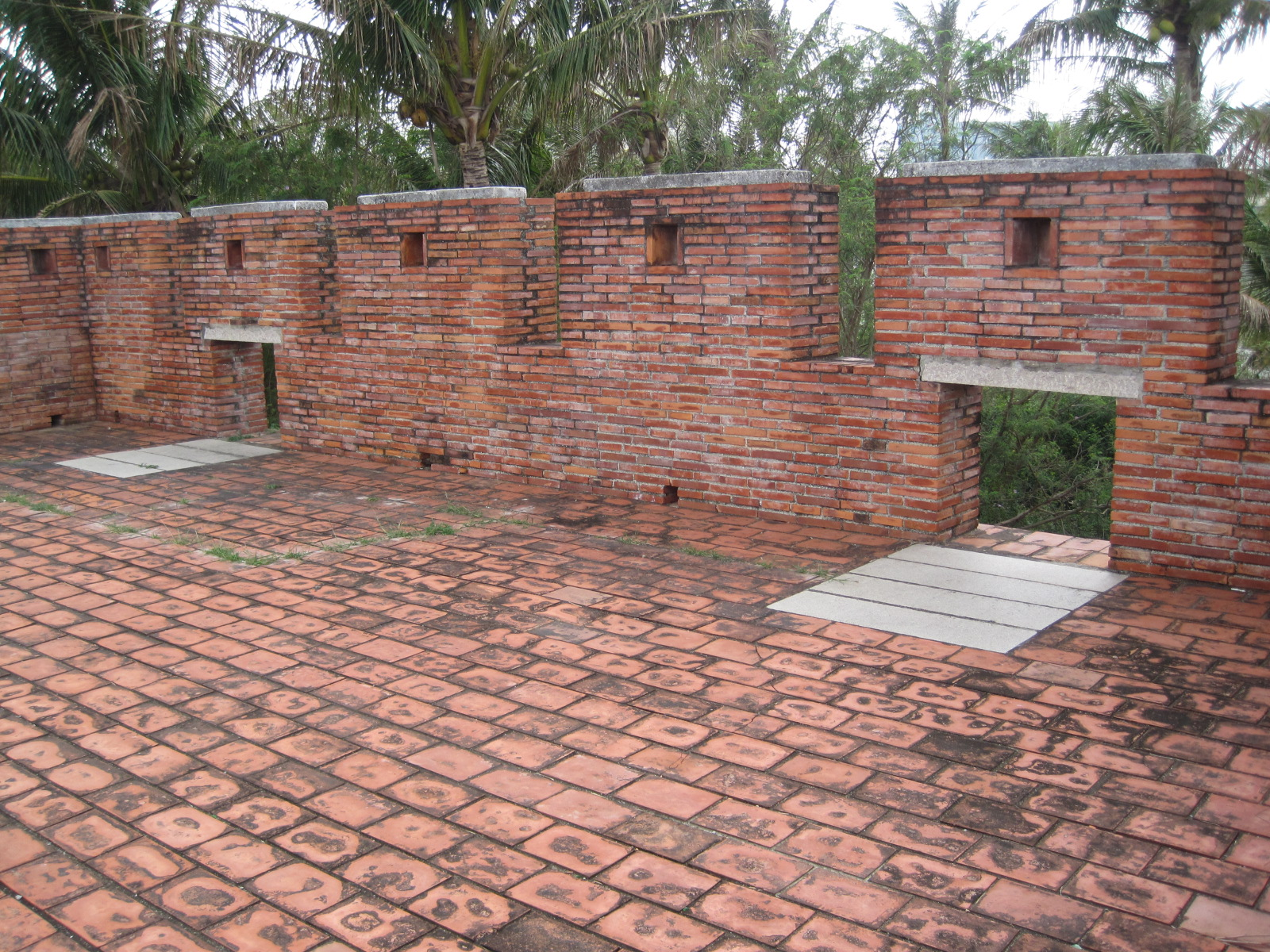
Embrasures on top of the wall
