= Chu Ting-shun =

Taiwanese folk musician and yueqin player

Chu Ting-shun 朱丁順
- Born: 30 November 1928; Hengchun, Pingtung County, Taiwan
- Died: 26 December 2012 (aged 84)

Chu Ting-shun (Chinese: 朱丁順; pinyin: Zhū Dīngshùn; 30 November 1928 – 26 December 2012) was a Taiwanese folk musician and yueqin player.

Born in Hengchun, Pingtung County, in 1928, when the area was still under Japanese rule, Chu began learning the music indigenous to the area on his own in 1945. In 1951, he entered his first singing competition, and, two years later, started formal training in Hengchun folk music. Chu Ting-shun was introduced to the piano by fellow musician Chu Hsien-chen. In 1993, Chu Ting-shun gave his first lesson in Hengchun folk music. One of his most prominent students was Chen Ming-chang. Chu won the Best Concert Award at the 14th Golden Melody Awards. Five years later, he received the Lifetime Contribution Award. Chu was named a "living national treasure" by the Taiwanese government in September 2012. He died on 26 December 2012, and was posthumously presented with the citation in June 2013.
