= List of earthquakes in 1959 =

Earthquakes in 1959
Approximate epicenters of the earthquakes in 1959
- 4.0–5.9 magnitude
- 6.0–6.9 magnitude
- 7.0–7.9 magnitude
- 8.0+ magnitude
- Strongest: Soviet Union, Kamchatka, Russia (Magnitude 7.9) May 4
- Deadliest: United States, Yellowstone National Park, Wyoming (Magnitude 7.3) August 18 28 deaths
- Total fatalities: 94

Number by magnitude
- 9.0+: 0

This is a list of earthquakes in 1959. Only magnitude 6.0 or greater earthquakes appear on the list. Lower magnitude events are included if they have caused death, injury or damage. Events which occurred in remote areas will be excluded from the list as they wouldn't have generated significant media interest. All dates are listed according to UTC time. Generally the year experienced below normal seismic activity with 10 magnitude 7.0+ events. The largest was a magnitude 7.9 which struck Russia in May. August was an interesting month mainly owing to a magnitude 7.3 earthquake which struck Yellowstone National Park. This resulted in 28 of the 94 deaths during 1959. Most of the deaths in fact were in August as Taiwan and Mexico were struck by events which caused 16 and 25 deaths respectively.

== Overall ==
=== By death toll ===
Rank	Death toll	Magnitude	Location	MMI	Depth (km)	Date
1	28	7.3	United States, Yellowstone National Park, Wyoming	X (Extreme)	5.0	August 18
2	25	6.4	Mexico, off the coast of Veracruz	VI (Strong)	31.0	August 26
3	18	5.4	Turkey, Mus Province	( )	15.0	October 25
4	16	7.2	Taiwan, off the east coast of Taiwan	VI (Strong)	25.0	August 15

- Note: At least 10 casualties

=== By magnitude ===
Rank	Magnitude	Death toll	Location	MMI	Depth (km)	Date
1	7.9	1	Soviet Union, eastern Kamchatka, Russia	X (Extreme)	55.0	May 4
= 2	7.3	28	United States, Yellowstone National Park, Wyoming	X (Extreme)	5.0	August 18
= 2	7.3	0	New Zealand, Kermadec Islands	( )	35.0	September 14
3	7.2	16	Taiwan, off the east coast of Taiwan	VI (Strong)	25.0	August 15
4	7.1	1	Chile, Tarapaca Region	VII (Very strong)	109.2	June 14
= 5	7.0	0	Japan, off the east coast of Honshu	V (Moderate)	35.0	January 22
= 5	7.0	0	Peru, Puno Region	( )	200.7	July 19
= 5	7.0	0	United Kingdom, Solomon Islands	( )	25.0	August 17
= 5	7.0	0	Australia, Madang Province, Papua and New Guinea	( )	133.1	November 19
= 5	7.0	0	United Kingdom, South Sandwich Islands	( )	25.0	December 14

- Note: At least 7.0 magnitude

== Notable events ==
=== January ===
January
- Strongest: 7.0 M_{w} Japan
- Total fatalities: 0

Number by magnitude
- 8.0–8.9: 0
- 7.0–7.9: 1
- 6.0–6.9: 8

Date	Country and location	M_{w}	Depth (km)	MMI	Notes	Casualties	
Date	Country and location	M_{w}	Depth (km)	MMI	Notes	Dead	Injured
8	United Kingdom, south of Dominica	6.6	138.8				
15	United Kingdom, south of Fiji	6.5	485.2				
20	Portugal, Baucau District, East Timor	6.0	35.0	V			
22	Japan, off the east coast of Honshu	7.0	35.0	V			
22	Japan, eastern Hokkaido	6.2	15.0	VII	Foreshock.		
24	Mexico, off the coast of Chiapas	6.0	35.0	IV			
30	Chile, Atacama Region	6.3	45.0	VI			
30	Japan, eastern Hokkaido	6.4	25.0	rowspan="2"| Doublet earthquake.			
30	Japan, eastern Hokkaido	6.4	25.0	VII			

=== February ===
February
- Strongest: 6.9 M_{w} Peru
- Total fatalities: 0

Number by magnitude
- 8.0–8.9: 0
- 7.0–7.9: 0
- 6.0–6.9: 6

Date	Country and location	M_{w}	Depth (km)	MMI	Notes	Casualties	
Date	Country and location	M_{w}	Depth (km)	MMI	Notes	Dead	Injured
7	Peru, off the north coast	6.9	30.0	VII	Some damage was caused.		
11	Mexico, Oaxaca	6.0	20.0				
16	Ecuador, off the coast	6.0	15.0	V			
20	Chile, Coquimbo Region	6.4	60.0				
23	Australia, West New Britain Province, Papua and New Guinea	6.0	35.0	V			
27	Japan, Ryukyu Islands	6.0	50.0				

=== March ===
March
- Strongest: 6.9 M_{w} Indonesia
- Total fatalities: 0

Number by magnitude
- 8.0–8.9: 0
- 7.0–7.9: 0
- 6.0–6.9: 8

Date	Country and location	M_{w}	Depth (km)	MMI	Notes	Casualties	
Date	Country and location	M_{w}	Depth (km)	MMI	Notes	Dead	Injured
1	Indonesia, off the north coast of West Papua (province)	6.9	35.0	VI			
2	Indonesia, Leti Islands	6.1	35.0	VI			
2	Afghanistan, Badakhshan Province	6.1	209.9				
9	Guatemala, Quiche Department	6.3	165.0				
10	Northern Rhodesia, Eastern Province, Zambia	6.1	0.0		Unknown depth.		
17	Japan, Ryukyu Islands	6.6	15.0				
18	Japan, off the east coast of Honshu	6.1	80.0				
23	United States, central Nevada	6.0	15.0	VII			

=== April ===
April
- Strongest: 6.9 M_{w} Taiwan
- Deadliest: 6.9 M_{w} Taiwan; 2 deaths
- Total fatalities: 2

Number by magnitude
- 8.0–8.9: 0
- 7.0–7.9: 0
- 6.0–6.9: 9
- 5.0–5.9: 2

Date	Country and location	M_{w}	Depth (km)	MMI	Notes	Casualties	
Date	Country and location	M_{w}	Depth (km)	MMI	Notes	Dead	Injured
5	France, Provence-Alpes-Cote d'Azur	5.5	15.0	VIII	Some damage was reported.		
6	Indonesia, Sumba	6.2	35.0	VI			
8	Argentina, Santa Cruz Province, Argentina	6.1	15.0	VII			
12	Mexico, Oaxaca	6.2	101.4				
12	Indonesia, off the south coast of Papua (province)	6.4	75.0				
12	Tonga	6.2	37.0				
20	Australia, off the south coast of New Britain, Papua and New Guinea	6.0	53.0	V			
22	United States, Fox Islands (Alaska)	6.0	51.0				
25	Turkey, Mugla Province	5.9	15.0	VIII	Some damage was reported.		
26	Taiwan, off the east coast of	6.9	118.0	VI	2 people were killed and some damage was reported.	2	
28	Mexico, off the coast of Chiapas	6.5	25.0	VI			

=== May ===
May
- Strongest: 7.9 M_{w} Soviet Union
- Deadliest: 7.9 M_{w} Soviet Union; 1 death
- Total fatalities: 1

Number by magnitude
- 8.0–8.9: 0
- 7.0–7.9: 1
- 6.0–6.9: 10

Date	Country and location	M_{w}	Depth (km)	MMI	Notes	Casualties	
Date	Country and location	M_{w}	Depth (km)	MMI	Notes	Dead	Injured
4	Soviet Union, eastern Kamchatka, Russia	7.9	55.0	X	1 person died and another 13 were hurt in the 1959 Kamchatka earthquake. Many homes were destroyed.	1	13
5	Soviet Union, eastern Kamchatka, Russia	6.3	15.0	VII	Aftershock.		
12	China, western Xizang Province	6.3	25.0				
12	Argentina, Salta Province	6.6	25.0	VII			
12	United States, Andreanof Islands, Alaska	6.0	35.0				
14	Greece, central Crete	6.1	35.0	VI			
21	Chile, Atacama Region	6.0	43.0	V			
22	New Zealand, Cook Strait	6.0	65.0				
24	Mexico, Oaxaca	6.6	65.0	VI	Major damage was caused.		
26	Japan, Ryukyu Islands	6.6	101.7				
29	New Hebrides, Vanuatu	6.5	97.6				

=== June ===
June
- Strongest: 7.1 M_{w} Chile
- Deadliest: 7.1 M_{w} Chile; 1 death
- Total fatalities: 1

Number by magnitude
- 8.0–8.9: 0
- 7.0–7.9: 1
- 6.0–6.9: 9

Date	Country and location	M_{w}	Depth (km)	MMI	Notes	Casualties	
Date	Country and location	M_{w}	Depth (km)	MMI	Notes	Dead	Injured
1	Australia, off the east coast of Bougainville Island, Papua and New Guinea	6.1	100.0				
2	Philippines, Batanes	6.2	15.0	rowspan="2"| Doublet earthquake.			
2	Philippines, Batanes	6.1	15.0				
14	Chile, Tarapaca Region	7.1	109.2	VII	1 person was killed and some damage was reported.	1	
18	Soviet Union, eastern Kamchatka, Russia	6.9	10.0	X	Aftershock of May 4 event.		
18	Soviet Union, eastern Kamchatka, Russia	6.6	10.0		Aftershock.		
27	New Zealand, Kermadec Islands	6.5	162.6				
27	China, Xinjiang Province	6.1	25.0	VII			
28	Indonesia, Savu Sea	6.0	60.0				
29	United Kingdom, Solomon Islands	6.0	35.0	IV			

=== July ===
July
- Strongest: 7.0 M_{w} Peru
- Total fatalities: 0

Number by magnitude
- 8.0–8.9: 0
- 7.0–7.9: 1
- 6.0–6.9: 8
- 5.0–5.9: 1

Date	Country and location	M_{w}	Depth (km)	MMI	Notes	Casualties	
Date	Country and location	M_{w}	Depth (km)	MMI	Notes	Dead	Injured
2	China, Henan Province	5.0	0.0	VI	Some people were injured and a few homes were destroyed. Unknown depth.		1+
3	New Hebrides, Vanuatu	6.5	15.0				
3	United Kingdom, Fiji	6.6	15.0				
6	Argentina, Santiago del Estero Province	6.8	629.2	rowspan="2"| Doublet earthquake.			
6	Argentina, Santiago del Estero Province	6.9	623.5				
9	Bolivia, Potosi Department	6.8	111.0				
18	Philippines, Luzon	6.7	150.0				
19	Peru, Puno Region	7.0	200.7				
22	Australia, off the east coast of New Britain, Papua and New Guinea	6.4	35.0	V			
24	United States, off the coast of northern California	6.2	15.0	IV			

=== August ===
August
- Strongest: 7.3 M_{w} United States
- Deadliest: 7.3 M_{w} United States; 28 deaths
- Total fatalities: 79

Number by magnitude
- 8.0–8.9: 0
- 7.0–7.9: 1
- 6.0–6.9: 10
- 5.0–5.9: 1

Date	Country and location	M_{w}	Depth (km)	MMI	Notes	Casualties	
Date	Country and location	M_{w}	Depth (km)	MMI	Notes	Dead	Injured
10	China, Shanxi Province	5.5	15.0	VII	43 homes were destroyed.		
15	Taiwan, off the east coast of	7.2	25.0	VI	The 1959 Hengchun earthquake left 16 people dead and another 63 injured. Many homes were destroyed.	16	63
17	United Kingdom, Solomon Islands	7.0	25.0	VI	Major damage was reported.		
18	Taiwan, off the east coast of	6.2	174.6		Aftershock.		
18	United States, Yellowstone National Park, Wyoming	7.3	5.0	X	One of the largest events to strike the state. 28 people were killed and extensive damage was caused by the 1959 Hebgen Lake earthquake. Costs were around $11 million (1959 rate).	28	
18	United States, Yellowstone National Park, Wyoming	6.5	5.0		Aftershock.		
18	United States, Yellowstone National Park, Wyoming	6.0	5.0		Aftershock.		
18	United States, Yellowstone National Park, Wyoming	6.3	5.0	VIII	Aftershock.		
19	United States, Yellowstone National Park, Wyoming	6.0	5.0	VII	Aftershock.		
24	United Kingdom, Manyara Region, Tanganyika	6.1	0.0		Unknown depth.		
26	Mexico, off the coast of Veracruz	6.4	31.0	VIII	During the 1959 Coatzacoalcos earthquake, 25 people were killed and another 200 were injured. Many homes were destroyed.	25	200
26	Canada, west of Vancouver Island	6.5	15.0				
28	United States, central Alaska	6.0	44.0				
29	Soviet Union, Lake Baikal, Russia	6.1	10.0	VII			

=== September ===
September
- Strongest: 7.3 M_{w} New Zealand
- Deadliest: 6.2 M_{w} Albania; 2 deaths
- Total fatalities: 2

Number by magnitude
- 8.0–8.9: 0
- 7.0–7.9: 1
- 6.0–6.9: 5

Date	Country and location	M_{w}	Depth (km)	MMI	Notes	Casualties	
Date	Country and location	M_{w}	Depth (km)	MMI	Notes	Dead	Injured
1	Albania, Elbasan County	6.2	20.0	X	2 people were killed and major damage was caused.	2	
3	Indonesia, southern Sulawesi	6.1	15.0	VI			
14	New Zealand, Kermadec Islands	7.3	35.0				
15	New Zealand, Kermadec Islands	6.8	35.0		Aftershock.		
25	Taiwan, southeast of	6.5	20.0	VI			
30	New Hebrides, Vanuatu	6.0	35.0				

=== October ===
October
- Strongest: 6.7 M_{w} Soviet Union
- Deadliest: 5.4 M_{w} Turkey; 18 deaths
- Total fatalities: 18

Number by magnitude
- 8.0–8.9: 0
- 7.0–7.9: 0
- 6.0–6.9: 9
- 5.0–5.9: 1

Date	Country and location	M_{w}	Depth (km)	MMI	Notes	Casualties	
Date	Country and location	M_{w}	Depth (km)	MMI	Notes	Dead	Injured
7	Albania, Fier County	6.0	20.0	VII			
15	Indonesia, Minahassa Peninsula, Sulawesi	6.6	35.0	VI			
19	United Kingdom, south of Fiji	6.6	582.0				
24	Soviet Union, Tashkent Region, Uzbekistan	6.0	15.0	VII			
25	Turkey, Mus Province	5.4	15.0		18 people were killed and some damage was reported.	18	
26	Japan, off the east coast of Honshu	6.5	20.0	IV			
26	Soviet Union, Kamchatka, Russia	6.6	132.8				
27	Soviet Union, Kuril Islands, Russia	6.7	61.8				
29	Soviet Union, Primorye, Russia	6.2	561.7				
31	United Kingdom, Fiji	6.6	418.0				

=== November ===
November
- Strongest: 7.0 M_{w} Australia
- Deadliest: 6.1 M_{w} China; 1+ deaths
- Total fatalities: 1+

Number by magnitude
- 8.0–8.9: 0
- 7.0–7.9: 1
- 6.0–6.9: 8
- 5.0–5.9: 1

Date	Country and location	M_{w}	Depth (km)	MMI	Notes	Casualties	
Date	Country and location	M_{w}	Depth (km)	MMI	Notes	Dead	Injured
2	Australia, East New Britain Province, Papua and New Guinea	6.3	45.8	VI			
7	France, Medea Province, Algeria	5.3	15.0	VIII	Some damage was caused.		
8	Japan, off the west coast of Hokkaido	6.5	30.0	V			
15	China, Xinjiang Province	6.1	47.8	V	At least 1 person died and some damage was caused.	1+	
15	Greece, Ionian Sea	6.7	15.0	VII			
19	Australia, Madang Province, Papua and New Guinea	7.0	133.1				
26	Indonesia, off the southwest coast of Sumatra	6.6	30.0	V			
28	Chile, Atacama Region	6.1	35.0	VI			
30	China, Xinjiang Province	6.0	35.0	VI			
30	United States, Kenai Peninsula, Alaska	6.1	0.0		Depth unknown.		

=== December ===
December
- Strongest: 7.0 M_{w} United Kingdom
- Total fatalities: 0

Number by magnitude
- 8.0–8.9: 0
- 7.0–7.9: 1
- 6.0–6.9: 7

Date	Country and location	M_{w}	Depth (km)	MMI	Notes	Casualties	
Date	Country and location	M_{w}	Depth (km)	MMI	Notes	Dead	Injured
2	Indonesia, Sulawesi	6.4	25.0	VI			
14	United States, Fox Islands (Alaska)	6.3	24.0				
14	United Kingdom, South Sandwich Islands	7.0	25.0				
18	United States, Fox Islands (Alaska)	6.0	27.3		Aftershock.		
25	Chile, Atacama Region	6.6	100.9				
27	Argentina, Santiago del Estero Province	6.0	593.8				
27	Soviet Union, off the east coast of Kamchatka, Russia	6.6	26.8	VI	Largest event of a series of events affecting the area.		
28	Soviet Union, off the east coast of Kamchatka, Russia	6.5	39.6				
