= 1959 Hengchun earthquake =

Earthquake in Taiwan

- Location within Taiwan
- UTC time: 1959-08-15 08:57:06
- ISC event: 882641
- USGS-ANSS: ComCat
- Local date: August 15, 1959
- Local time: 16:57 CST
- Magnitude: 7.1 M_{L}
- Depth: 20 kilometres (12 mi)
- Epicenter: 21.7°N 121.3°E
- Areas affected: Taiwan
- Tsunami: Yes
- Casualties: 16 or 17 dead

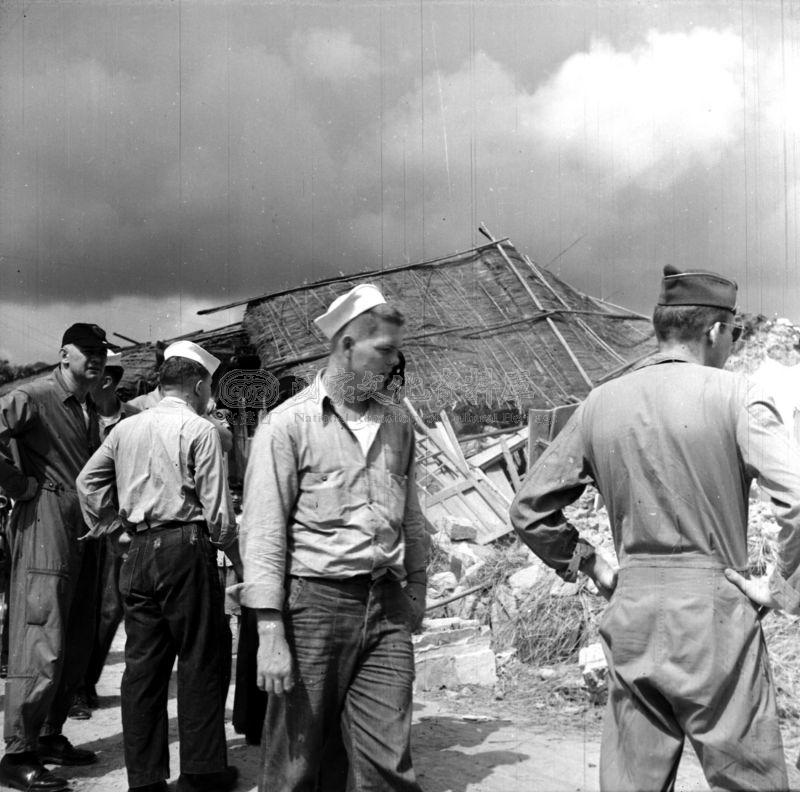
Earthquake in Hengchun area of Pingtung, US troops assist in disaster relief in Manzhou Township

The 1959 Hengchun earthquake (Chinese: 1959年恆春地震; pinyin: 1959 nián Héngchūn dìzhèn) struck the southern tip of Taiwan on August 15. With a Richter magnitude of 7.1, it was the tenth deadliest earthquake in twentieth century Taiwan, killing 16 or 17 people.

== Earthquake ==
The earthquake occurred at 16:57 CST on Saturday 15 August 1959, with an epicentre 50 kilometres (31 mi) east-southeast of Cape Eluanbi, the southern tip of the island of Taiwan. The shock had a focal depth of 20 kilometres (12 mi). A tsunami 4–5 m (13–16 ft) high hit both the southeastern and southwestern coasts of Hengchun. The earthquake was felt throughout Taiwan and also in the Penghu islands off Taiwan's western coast.

== Damage ==
According to Taiwan's Central Weather Bureau the casualties and damage were as follows:

- 17 dead
- 33 seriously injured
- 35 lightly injured
- 1,214 dwellings completely destroyed
- 1,375 dwellings partially destroyed

Due to Hengchun's exposed position on the southern tip of Taiwan, residents frequently built heavy houses of stone to counter both the effects of typhoons and the seasonal northwesterly monsoon winds. These structures effectively resisted the effects of wind, but fared poorly in earthquakes, collapsing and trapping the occupants.

The shock occurred in the late afternoon, which meant that many people were outdoors when it struck, lessening casualties from building collapse. The estimated cost of the damage (in 1959 New Taiwan Dollars) was NT$24,111,920 for private housing, and NT$6,127,000 for damaged or collapsed school buildings, giving a total of just over NT$30m.

== See also ==
- List of earthquakes in 1959
- List of earthquakes in Taiwan
