= Antonio Modesto Quirasco =

Mexican politician

Governor of Veracruz
- In office 1 December 1956 – 30 November 1962
- Preceded by: Marco Antonio Muñoz Turnbull
- Succeeded by: Fernando López Arias

Personal details
- Born: May 20, 1904
- Died: February 18, 1981 (aged 76)
- Profession: Politician

Antonio Modesto Quirasco (May 20, 1904 – February 18, 1981) was a Mexican politician. He was governor of Veracruz from 1956 to 1962.

There is a football stadium bearing his name in Jalapa, Veracruz.
