= Hengchun Airport =

Airport in Hengchun, Pingtung County, Taiwan

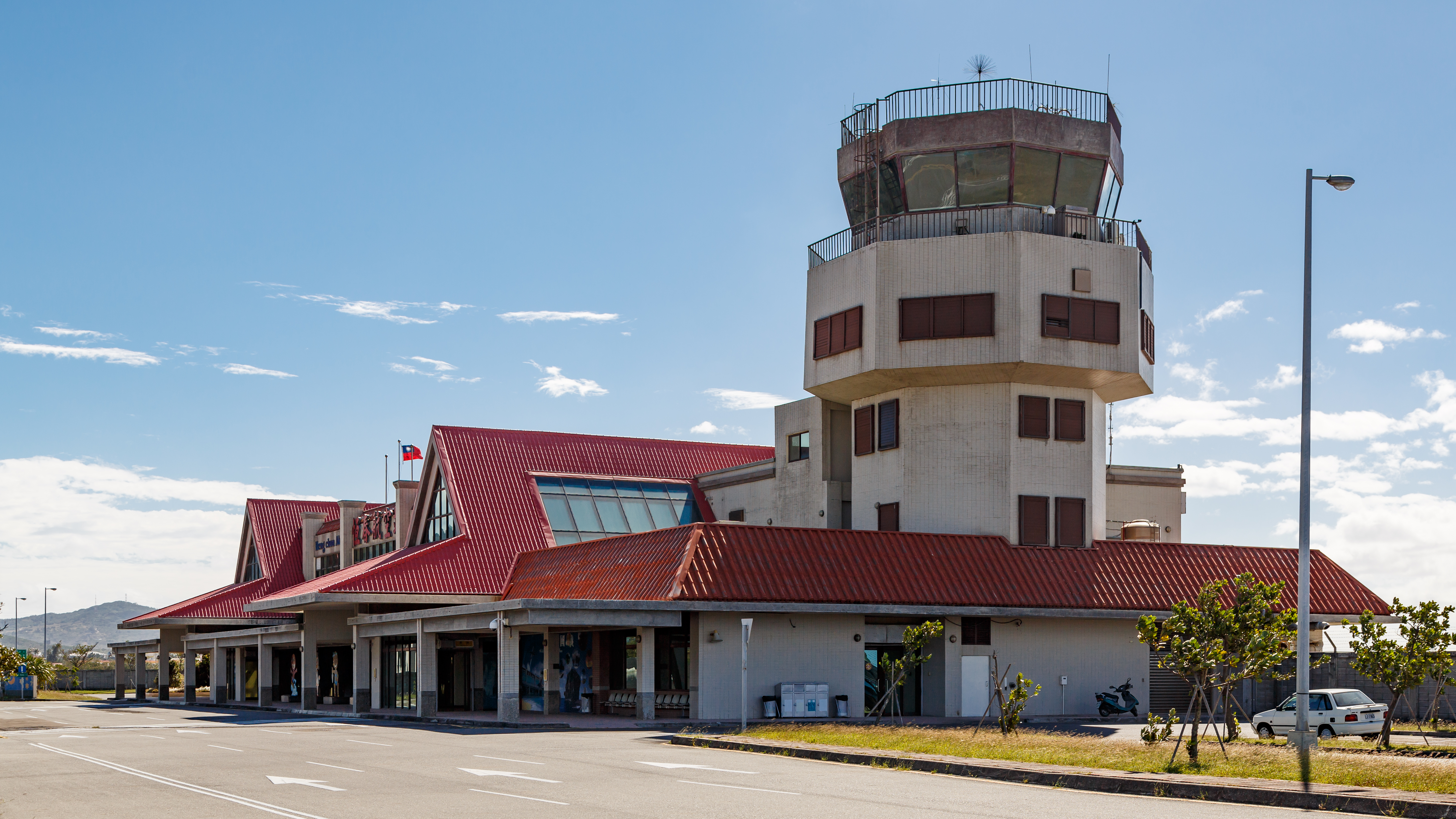
- IATA: HCN; ICAO: RCKW

Summary
- Airport type: Public
- Operator: Civil Aeronautics Administration
- Location: Hengchun, Pingtung County, Taiwan
- Elevation AMSL: 14 m (46 ft)
- Coordinates: 22°02′17″N 120°43′49″E

Map
- Location of airport in Taiwan

Runways
Direction	Length		Surface
Direction	m	ft	Surface
14/32	1,700	5,577	Cement

Hengchun Airport (Chinese: 恆春機場; pinyin: Héngchūn Jīchǎng) (IATA: HCN, ICAO: RCKW) is an airport in Renshou Village, Hengchun Township, Pingtung County, Taiwan. The airport is near Kenting National Park and is the southernmost airport in Taiwan.

Due to its location, the airport frequently experiences strong katabatic winds and is forced to close. Because of this, the load factor of the flights rarely exceeds 40%; airlines are considering filing applications for withdrawal of services to Hengchun. Scheduled flights ceased in September 2014. In late May 2019, Taiwanese carrier, Uni Air has announced that they will be officially ending flights from Taipei Songshan Airport to Hengchun after they suspended flights from Taipei Songshan Airport to Hengchun back in September 2014.

== History ==
The airport construction was finished in 2003 and opened to public in January 2004 with a cost of NT$539,000,000. However, since the opening of Taiwan High Speed Rail in 2007, there has been a sharp decline in the number of passengers using the airport. The airport has not processed any passenger since August 2014. The airport only served around 768 passengers in 2014, compared to 23,000 passengers in its inaugural year of 2004. In October 2015, the Civil Aeronautics Administration announced that they will make a decision whether to close the airport in the second half of 2016 due to the extremely low passenger rate. In 2019, the last route was cancelled.

== Airlines and destinations ==
As of November 2025, the airport remains closed and there are no scheduled flights operate at the airport.

== See also ==
- Civil Aeronautics Administration (Taiwan)
- Transportation in Taiwan
- List of airports in Taiwan
