= Hengchun =

Urban township in Pingtung County, Taiwan

Coordinates: 22°00′N 120°45′E

Hengchun 恆春 Kōshun
- Urban township
- Hengchun Township · 恆春鎮
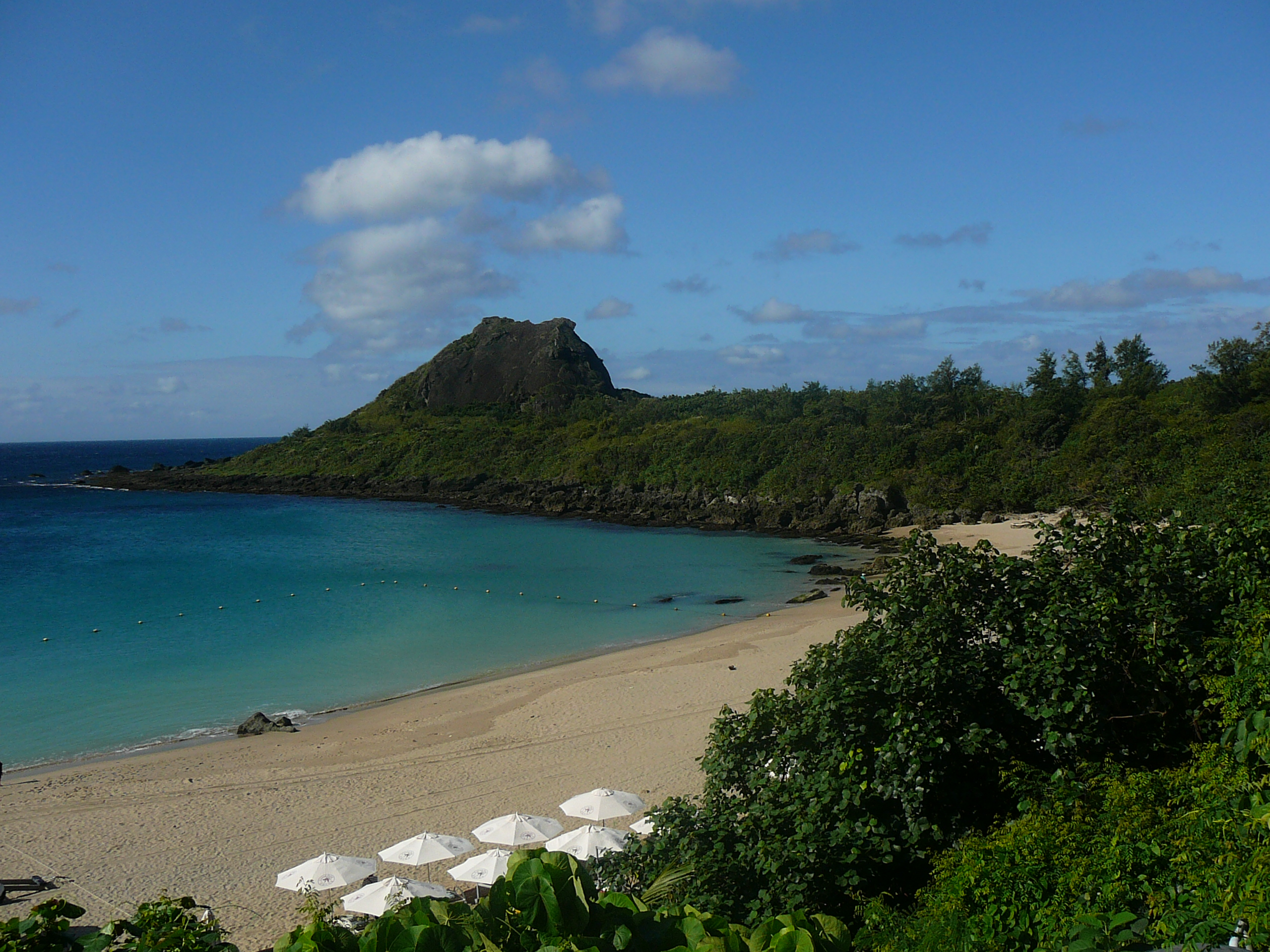
- Beach in Kenting

- Hengchun Township in Pingtung County
- Country: Taiwan
- Region: Southern Taiwan

Government
  - Mayor: Lu Yu-tung (盧玉棟)

Area
  - Total: 136.7630 km^{2} (52.8045 sq mi)

Population (February 2024)
  - Total: 29,702
  - Density: 217.18/km^{2} (562.49/sq mi)
- Households: 10568
- Divisions: 17 villages, 272 neighborhoods
- Postal code: 946
- Website: www.hengchuen.gov.tw (in Chinese)

Hengchun

Chinese name
- Traditional Chinese: 恆春
- Literal meaning: Eternal Spring
Transcriptions
Standard Mandarin
- Hanyu Pinyin: Héngchūn
- Wade–Giles: Hêng-ch‘un
- Tongyong Pinyin: Héngchun
Hakka
- Pha̍k-fa-sṳ: Hèn-chhûn
Southern Min
- Hokkien POJ: Hêng-chhun

Japanese name
- Kanji: 恒春
Transcriptions
- Romanization: Kōshun

Alternate name: Longkiau
- Traditional Chinese: 瑯嶠
- Literal meaning: Transcribing an indigenous name
Transcriptions
Standard Mandarin
- Hanyu Pinyin: Lángqiáo, Lángjiào
- Wade–Giles: Lang-chiao
Southern Min
- Hokkien POJ: Lông-kiau

Alternative Chinese name
- Traditional Chinese: 琅嶠
Transcriptions

Second alternative Chinese name
- Traditional Chinese: 琅𤩝
Transcriptions

Hengchun is a township located on the southern tip of the Hengchun Peninsula in Pingtung County, Taiwan. It is the southernmost township in Taiwan. Hengchun is also the only urban township in the southern part of Pingtung County. Hengchun has a land area of 136.76 km^{2} (52.80 sq mi) and has a population of 29,702 as of February 2024.

The city of Hengchun is the entryway to Kenting National Park, the southernmost National Park in the country. With pristine beaches and a vibrant tourist industry, the Hengchun area often attracts more travelers than local residents. The city itself was once completely surrounded by a city wall; now about half of the wall remains intact, as well as the four city gates. On weekends, the streets of nearby Kenting are filled with cars and tour buses.

The 2008 Taiwanese film Cape No. 7, the top-grossing film in Taiwan's film history, features Hengchun.

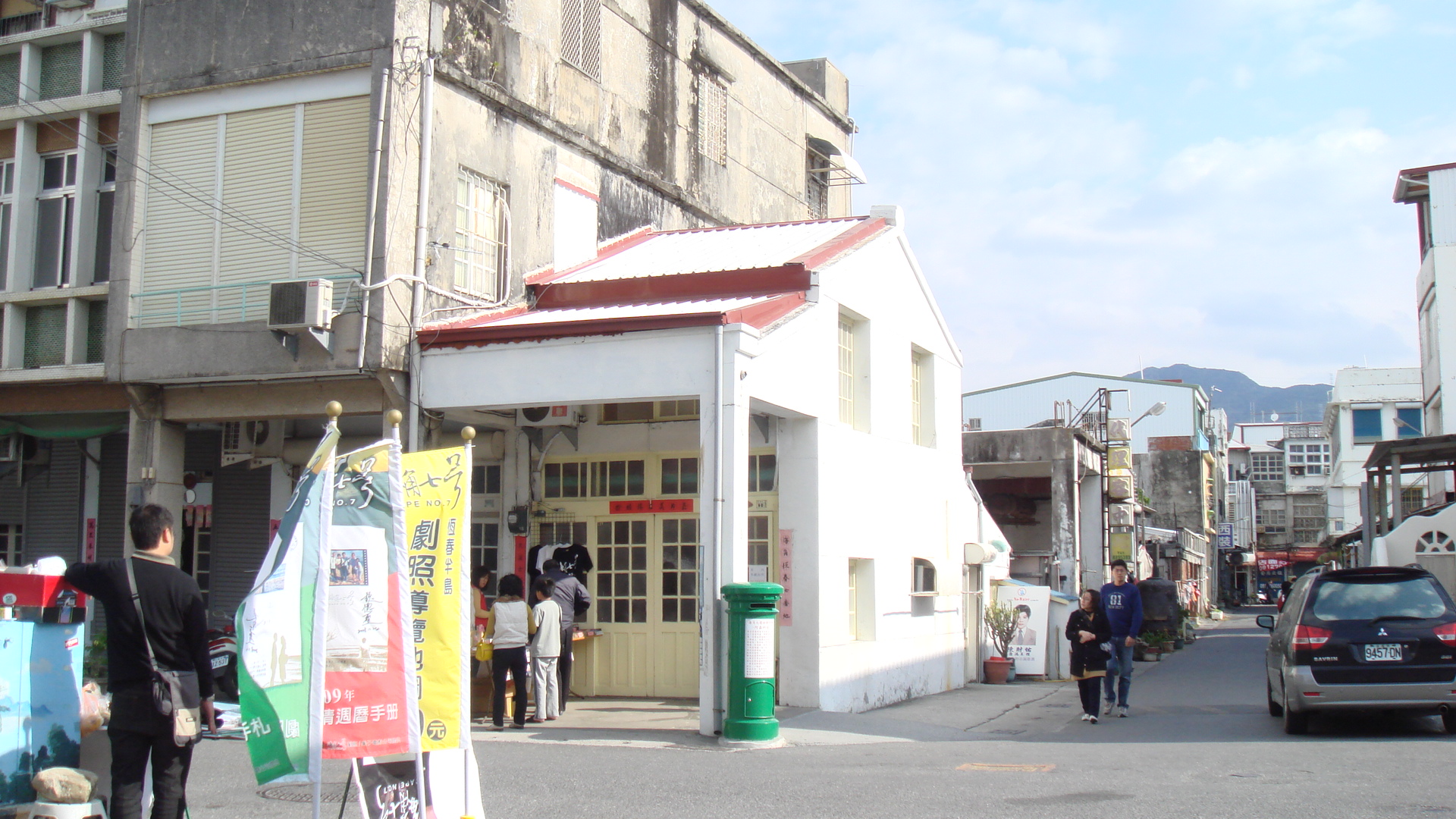
Cape No. 7

== Names ==
The area of the modern township was known to the Dutch as Lonkjouw, alternatively spelled Liangkiau, Long-kiau, Longkiau, Loncjou, Lonckjau, Lonckiau, Lonkiauw, Lonckjouw, and Lonckquiouw in early records. The name was borrowed from the Paiwan language of the Paiwan people who lived in the area before the Han Chinese's colonization during 18th century.

The Qing viceroy Shen Baozhen noted the equitable climate during his 1875 inspection of Taiwan Island, with the area's crops staying "green and prosperous" year-round. He began calling the area Hengchun ("Always Spring") before he left, and the name has remained ever since. Under Japanese rule, the area was known as Kōshun, from the Japanese pronunciation of the same name.

== History ==
=== Early history ===
The village of Longkiau was the southernmost town that was occupied by the Dutch on Taiwan Island. The area was mostly occupied by the Paiwan and other Taiwanese aborigines.

=== Qing dynasty ===
After the Rover Incident, wherein shipwrecked American sailors were massacred by the locals, Charles Le Gendre, the US consul at Amoy (Xiamen), visited the area. He found Longkiau at the far point of the curve forming Longkiau Bay. Its population of about 1,500 was "mostly engaged in the culture of peanuts, rice, sweet potatoes, a little sugar cane, and also in fishing".

In response to the 1871 Mudan Incident, wherein shipwrecked Ryukyuan sailors were massacred by the locals, Japan—following America's example—undertook a punitive expedition in 1874. The Japanese landed in Longkiau Bay and pushed north from there.

Now aware of the danger of foreign interference and colonization posed by the Qing Empire's refusal to take responsibility for the actions of Taiwan's aborigines, the viceroy of Liangjiang Shen Baozhen toured Taiwan in 1875 in preparation for reform of the island's administration. He ordered attacks against the still restive tribes and began a building program in the southern half of the island which included the fortified lighthouse at Eluanbi. He memorialized on behalf of building a new city in Longkiau (which he gave the more propitious Chinese name "Hengchun") to accommodate and protect foreign sailors. This request was granted: the portion of Fengshan County south of Fangliao's river became the new Hengchun County and its officials fortified a village south of the old Longkiau as their new county seat. The old location continued to be known as Longkiau.

Taiwan Prefecture originally covered the entire island as part of Fujian Province. When the island became its own province in 1887, Hengchun County formed part of Tainan Prefecture.

=== Japanese rule ===
Under Japanese rule, the town was known as Kōshun. It received a local office (町, chō) in November 1901 and became the seat of its own district in Takao Prefecture in 1920. Commercial whaling began in the area from 1913 to 1915, and was revived from 1920 to 1943.

=== Post-war ===
The Republic of China (ROC) took over Taiwan after World War II. Hengchun's whaling industry was restored in 1955 and formally banned in 1981.

On December 26, 2006, a 7.0–7.2 magnitude earthquake with an epicenter off the southwest coast of Taiwan occurred (approximately 22.8 km southwest of Hengchun). It caused damage to many houses in Hengchun, including fifteen historical buildings in the historic center of the township. Two casualties were reported, with many more injured. It was the strongest earthquake to hit Hengchun in one hundred years.

In 2025 an asteroid discovered in the area was named "Hengchun" and put on display at the Pingtung County Library.

== Geography ==
Hengchun is the southernmost administrative division of the island. It is bordered to the northwest by Checheng Township and to the northeast by Manzhou Township.

=== Climate ===
Hengchun (2009–2013)

Climate chart (precipitation, max. and min. temperature)
J	F	M	A	M	J	J	A	S	O	N	D
26 26 18	31 27 19	19 28 20	60 30 23	197 31 24	415 32 25	391 32 26	417 32 25	242 31 25	143 31 24	49 28 22	21 26 20
- █ Average max. and min. temperatures in °C
- █ Precipitation totals in mm
- Source: Wunderground
Imperial conversion
J	F	M	A	M	J	J	A	S	O	N	D
1 78 64	1.2 81 66	0.7 82 69	2.4 85 73	7.8 88 76	16 89 77	15 89 78	16 89 78	9.5 88 76	5.6 87 74	1.9 83 72	0.8 79 67
- █ Average max. and min. temperatures in °F
- █ Precipitation totals in inches

Hengchun is well known for its tropical monsoon climate with warm temperatures year round, as befits its name. It usually has neither a cool winter nor an extremely hot summer, with average monthly mean temperatures ranging between 21 and 28 degrees Celsius. The climate is generally divided into two seasons, the cooler and drier season and the warmer and wetter season. During the cool and dry season from early December to late March of the following year, precipitation are relatively low with temperatures ranging from 18 to 26 degrees Celsius, occasional cold fronts can drop both the day and the night time temperatures by around 2–4 °C, while temperatures during a clear sunny day can reach as high as 28–30 °C. During the warm and wet season temperature range from 24 to 32 degrees Celsius with a relatively abundant rainfall especially from May–October, when Taiwan is affected by the Pacific typhoon season.

Hengchun's spring-like climate is very much dictated by its location surrounded by the ocean, resulting in a noticeably smaller difference between the day and night temperatures than most other townships of Pingtung. Hengchun is usually cooler than other townships in the county during daytime and warmer than others during the night, especially during the winter months, when daily lows usually hovers around 18–20 degrees Celsius at Hengchun and around 15–18 at Pingtung city, while daily highs usually hovers around 24–26 degrees Celsius at the township and 25–28 at Pingtung City. Temperatures dips below 15 degrees Celsius on average once every 3 years, mostly on early mornings of January when Taiwan is affected by a cold front.

The climate is also supportive of tropical rainforests (tropical monsoon rainforest) which occupied the entire Hengchun peninsula, while palm trees and other tropical vegetation grows on the coastlines, much like the rest of Pingtung.

The Hengchun Peninsula experiences strong katabatic winds.

Climate data for Hengchun (1991–2020 normals, extremes 1897–present）
Month	Jan	Feb	Mar	Apr	May	Jun	Jul	Aug	Sep	Oct	Nov	Dec	Year
Record high °C (°F)	32.2 (90.0)	32.4 (90.3)	34.2 (93.6)	35.8 (96.4)	37.1 (98.8)	36.4 (97.5)	35.6 (96.1)	35.3 (95.5)	36.0 (96.8)	34.1 (93.4)	33.8 (92.8)	32.5 (90.5)	37.1 (98.8)
Mean daily maximum °C (°F)	24.4 (75.9)	25.5 (77.9)	27.3 (81.1)	29.5 (85.1)	31.2 (88.2)	31.8 (89.2)	32.1 (89.8)	31.8 (89.2)	31.3 (88.3)	29.7 (85.5)	27.8 (82.0)	25.1 (77.2)	29.0 (84.1)
Daily mean °C (°F)	21.1 (70.0)	21.7 (71.1)	23.3 (73.9)	25.4 (77.7)	27.3 (81.1)	28.4 (83.1)	28.7 (83.7)	28.3 (82.9)	27.8 (82.0)	26.5 (79.7)	24.7 (76.5)	22.2 (72.0)	25.5 (77.8)
Mean daily minimum °C (°F)	18.6 (65.5)	19.0 (66.2)	20.5 (68.9)	22.6 (72.7)	24.5 (76.1)	25.8 (78.4)	26.0 (78.8)	25.6 (78.1)	25.1 (77.2)	24.1 (75.4)	22.5 (72.5)	20.0 (68.0)	22.9 (73.1)
Record low °C (°F)	8.4 (47.1)	9.8 (49.6)	10.4 (50.7)	14.7 (58.5)	17.1 (62.8)	18.6 (65.5)	19.4 (66.9)	19.5 (67.1)	18.7 (65.7)	16.0 (60.8)	12.7 (54.9)	9.5 (49.1)	8.4 (47.1)
Average precipitation mm (inches)	21.8 (0.86)	23.2 (0.91)	16.0 (0.63)	35.2 (1.39)	146.6 (5.77)	350.7 (13.81)	391.3 (15.41)	533.4 (21.00)	320.3 (12.61)	125.3 (4.93)	58.3 (2.30)	29 (1.1)	2,051.1 (80.72)
Average precipitation days (≥ 0.1 mm)	5.1	5.0	3.2	4.3	9.4	15.0	15.8	17.5	13.5	8.6	4.7	4.0	106.1
Average relative humidity (%)	70.8	72.0	71.8	73.4	76.1	81.1	80.5	82.2	77.4	71.4	70.5	69.2	74.7
Mean monthly sunshine hours	163.7	161.3	194.3	189.8	193.1	193.2	210.3	182.1	180.1	196.3	174.6	157.7	2,196.5
Source: Central Weather Bureau

== Administrative divisions ==
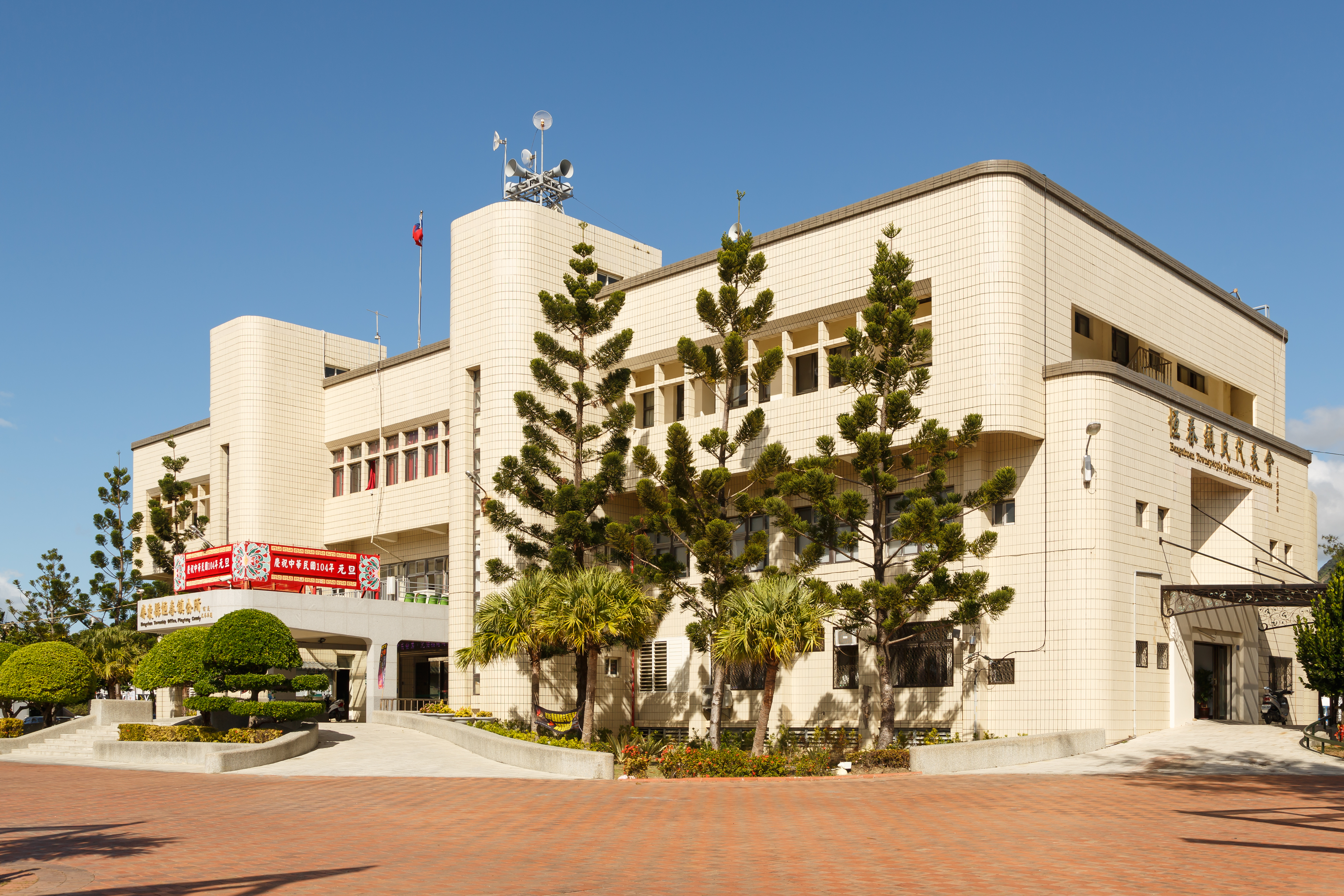
Hengchun Township office

The township comprises 17 villages: Chengbei, Chengnan, Chengxi, Daguang, Dehe, Eluan, Jiahu, Kending, Longshui, Nanwan, Renshou, Shanhai, Shanjiao, Shuiquan, Sigou, Tougou and Wangsha.

== Education ==
Vocational High School

- National Hengchun Vocational High School 國立恆春高級工業商業職業學校

Middle School

- Pingtung Hsien Hengchun Middle School 屏東縣立恆春國民中學

Elementary Schools

- Hengchun Elementary School 屏東縣恆春鎮恆春國民小學
- Hengchun Elementary School – Nanwan Branch 屏東縣恆春鎮恆春國民小學南灣分校
- Chau Yon Elementary School 屏東縣恆春鎮僑勇國民小學
- Da Guang Elementary School 屏東縣恆春鎮大光國民小學
- Shan Hai Elementary School 屏東縣恆春鎮山海國民小學
- Swey Chuen Elementary School 屏東縣恆春鎮水泉國民小學
- Lung Chuen Elementary School 屏東縣恆春鎮龍泉國民小學
- Da Ping Elementary School 屏東縣恆春鎮大平國民小學
- Kenting Elementary School 屏東縣立墾丁國民小學

== Tourist attractions ==
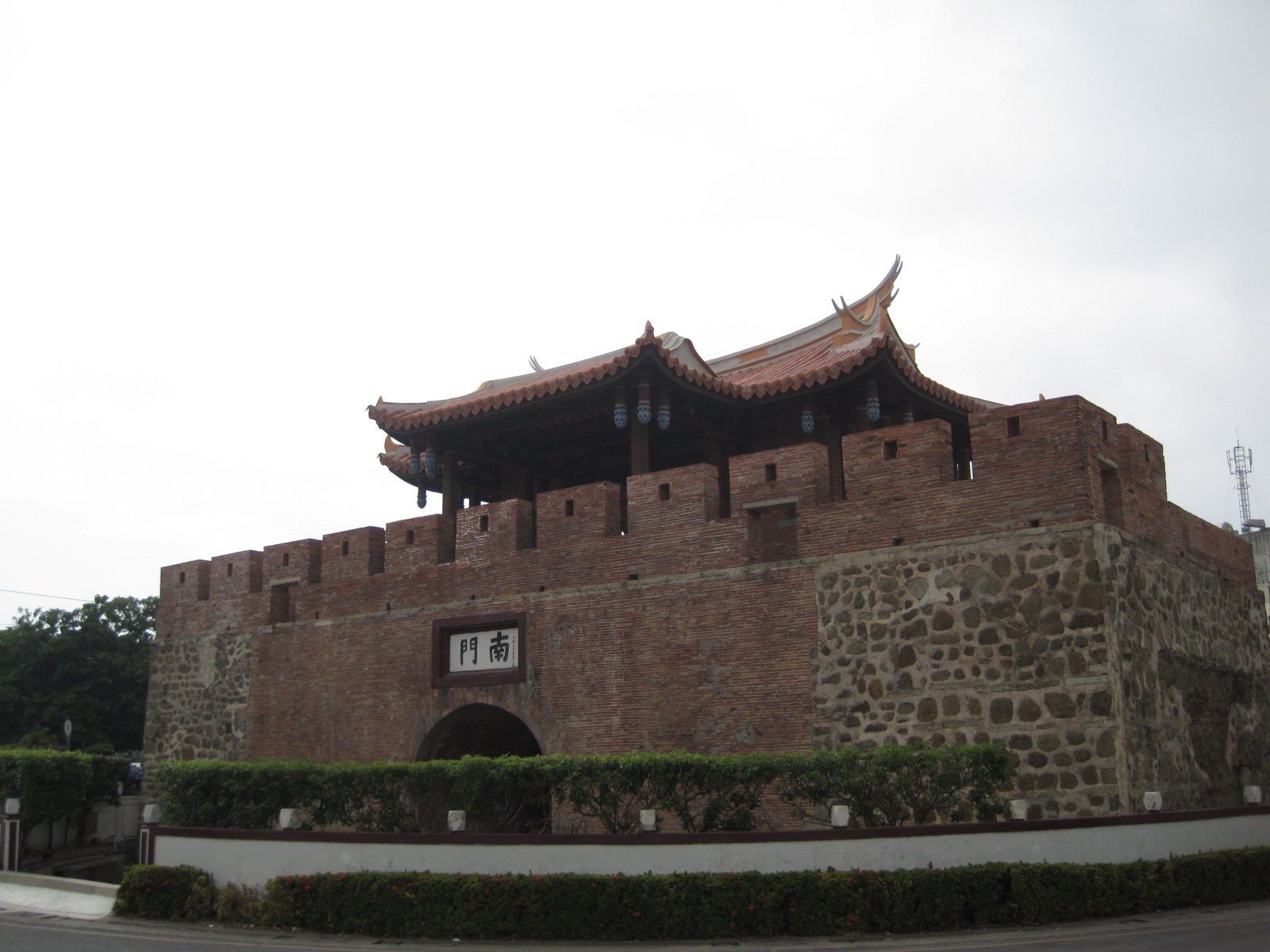
South Gate of Hengchun Fortress

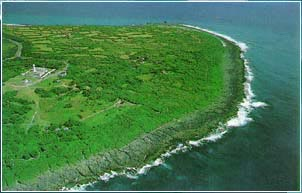
Cape Eluanbi in Hengchun is the southernmost point in Taiwan

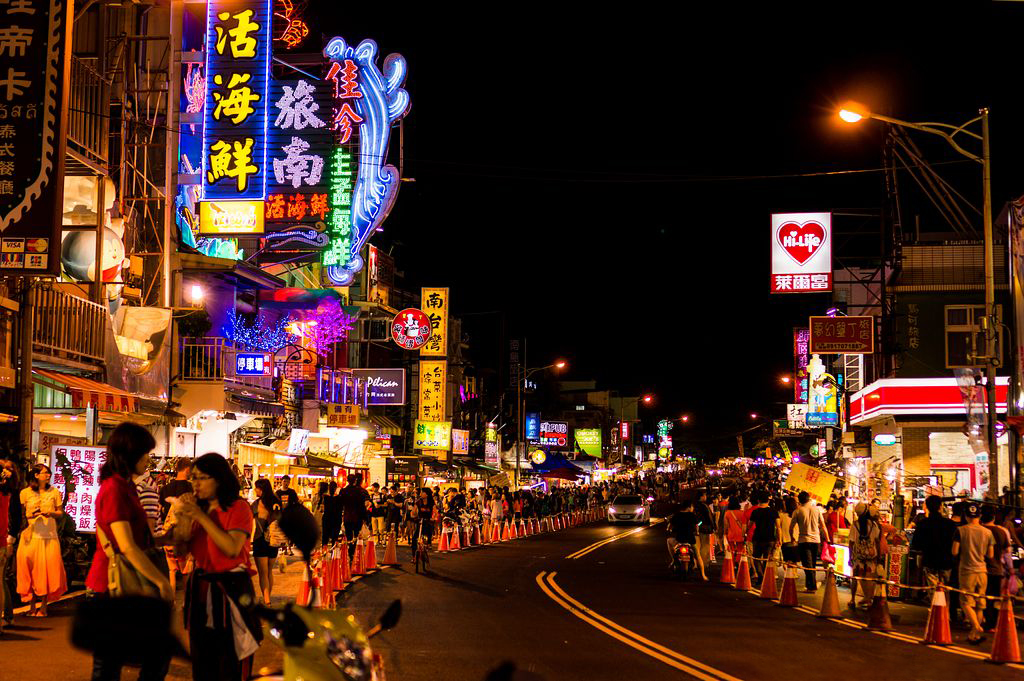
Kenting Night Market

Hengchun is located within Kenting National Park and is the gateway to the tropical beach resorts and night markets of Kenting, therefore it is one of the most well known tourist towns in Taiwan.

The "Hengchun Old Town" (恆春古城) is one of the best-preserved historical towns in Taiwan with four gates intact and about half of the walls remaining. It was built during the Qing dynasty in the 1st year of the Guangxu Era (1875) and completed in 1879. It has a north, east, south, and west gate and the outer circumference of the moat measures 880 zhang (about 2,700 m or 8,800 ft). In 1988, an actual measurement of the length was conducted, showing that the length in total amount to 2,550 meters (8,370 ft).

The peak season of tourism in Hengchun usually lasts from April to late October when daytime temperatures are usually hot, while the off season lasts from November to March of the following year, with the exception of the week of the Chinese New Year holiday which usually takes place during late January or February, when large amount of tourist from around the whole country, mostly from Northern Taiwan travels to Hengchun and Kenting for the peninsula's warm weather.

=== Festivals ===
- Pingtung Picturesque Rice Field Life Festival
- Folk Music Festival

== Transportation ==
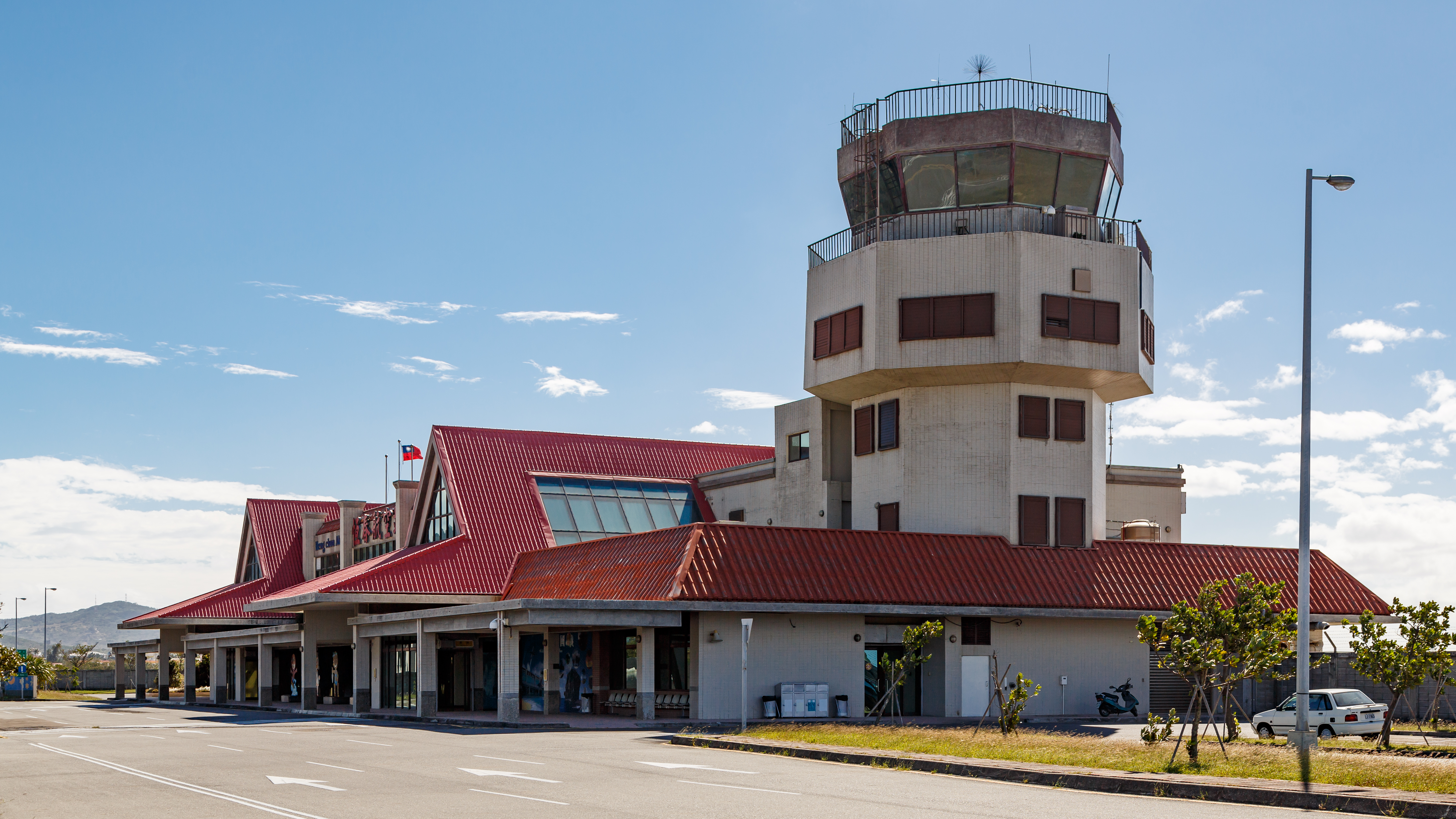
Hengchun Airport

The township was served by Hengchun Airport, with domestic flights from Taipei Songshan Airport in Taipei. Scheduled flights ceased in 2014.

== Notable natives ==
- Chang Hsiu-ching, singer
- Chu Ting-shun, folk musician

== Friendship cities ==
- Wakkanai, Hokkaido, Japan (since 2023)

== See also ==
- List of Taiwanese superlatives
