= List of hotels in Taiwan =

The list of hotels in Taiwan provides hotel names by city within Taiwan. The list mainly includes five and four star hotels and is not a directory of every hotel in the country.

== By city ==
=== Taipei ===
- Caesar Metro Taipei
- Caesar Park Taipei
- Cosmos Hotel Taipei
- Courtyard Taipei
- Grand Hotel (Taipei)
- Grand Hyatt Taipei
- Grand Mayfull Hotel Taipei
- Hotel Indigo Taipei North
- Hotel Metropolitan Premier Taipei
- InterContinental Taipei
- The Landis Taipei
- Le Méridien Taipei
- Mandarin Oriental, Taipei
- Marriott Taipei
- The Okura Prestige Taipei
- Regent Taipei
- Shangri-La Far Eastern, Taipei
- Sheraton Grand Taipei Hotel
- W Taipei

=== New Taipei ===
- Caesar Park Hotel Banqiao
- Four Points by Sheraton Linkou
- Four Points by Sheraton Taipei Bali
- Fuji Grand Hotel
- InterContinental New Taipei Hot Spring
- Le Méridien Taipei Banqiao

=== Keelung ===
- Evergreen Laurel Hotel Keelung

=== Taoyuan ===
- Monarch Skyline Hotel
- Hyatt Regency Taoyuan International Airport
- Orchard Park Hotel (zh:桃禧航空城酒店)
- Sheraton Taoyuan Hotel

=== Taichung ===
- InterContinental Taichung
- Le Meridien Taichung
- Millennium Hotel Taichung
- National Hotel
- Tempus Hotel Taichung
- The Landis Taichung
- The Lin Hotel
- The Splendor Hotel Taichung
- Windsor Hotel Taichung

=== Tainan ===
- Aloft Tainan Anping
- Crowne Plaza Tainan
- Evergreen Plaza Hotel (zh:台糖長榮酒店)
- Gloria Prince Hotel (王子大飯店)
- Hotel Cozzi Ximen Tainan
- Shangri-La's Far Eastern Plaza Hotel Tainan

=== Kaohsiung ===
- Ambassador Hotel Kaohsiung
- Grand Hi-Lai Hotel
- H₂O Hotel
- Han-Hsien International Hotel
- Hotel Nikko Kaohsiung
- Howard Plaza Hotel Kaohsiung
- InterContinental Kaohsiung
- Kaohsiung Grand Hotel
- Kaohsiung Marriott Hotel

== By county ==
=== Hsinchu ===
- Ambassador Hotel Hsinchu
- Sheraton Hsinchu Hotel

=== Chiayi ===
- Voco Chiayi

=== Yilan ===
- Four Points by Sheraton Yilan Jiaoxi

=== Taitung ===
- Sheraton Taitung Hotel

=== Hualien ===
- Farglory Hotel Hualien

=== Penghu ===
- Four Points by Sheraton Penghu

== Gallery ==
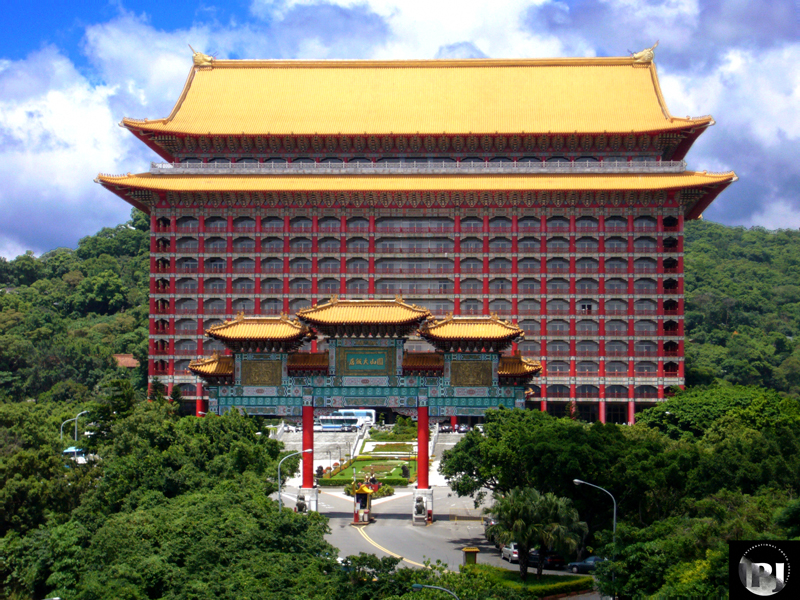
Grand Hotel (Taipei)

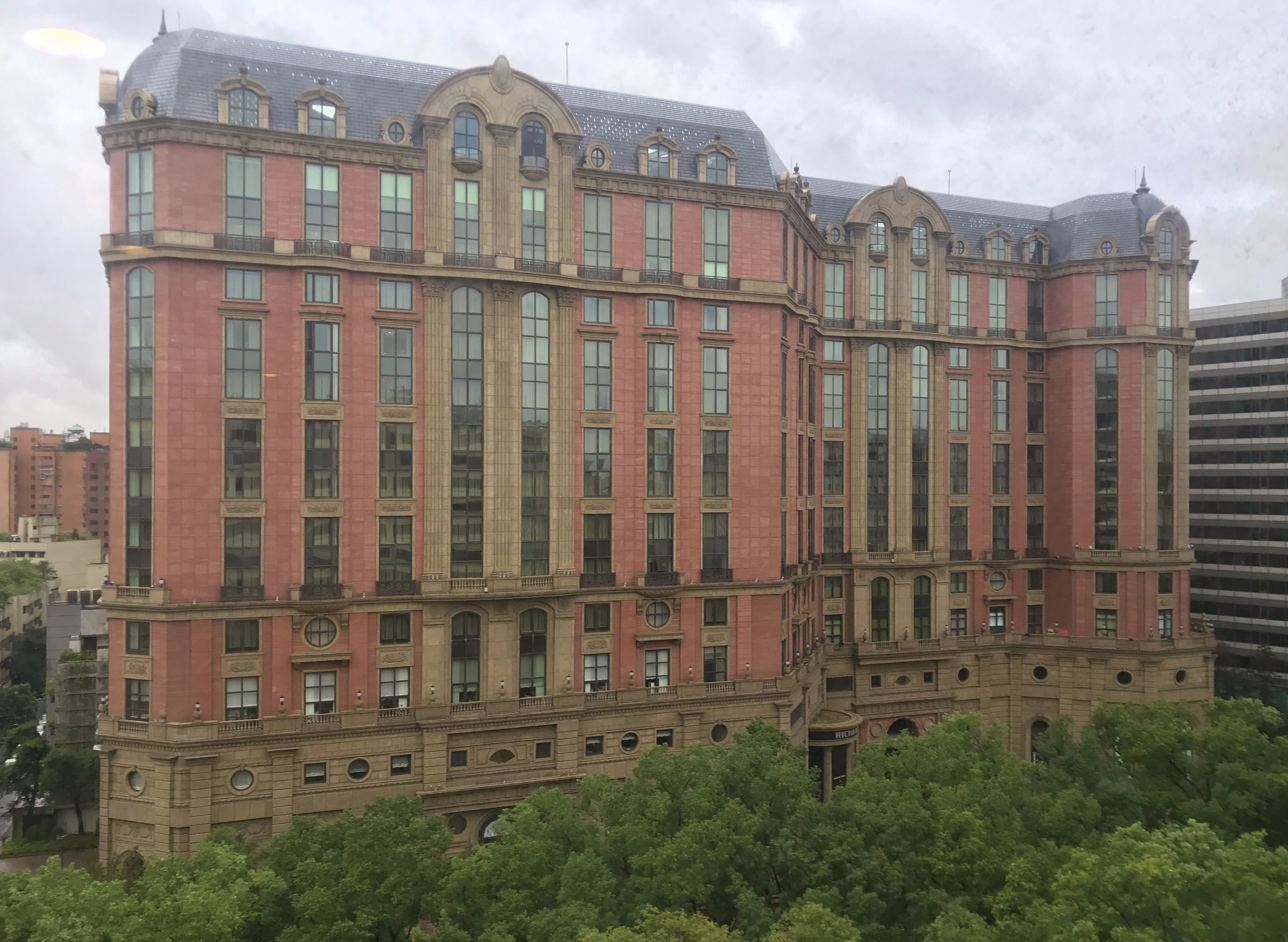
Mandarin Oriental, Taipei

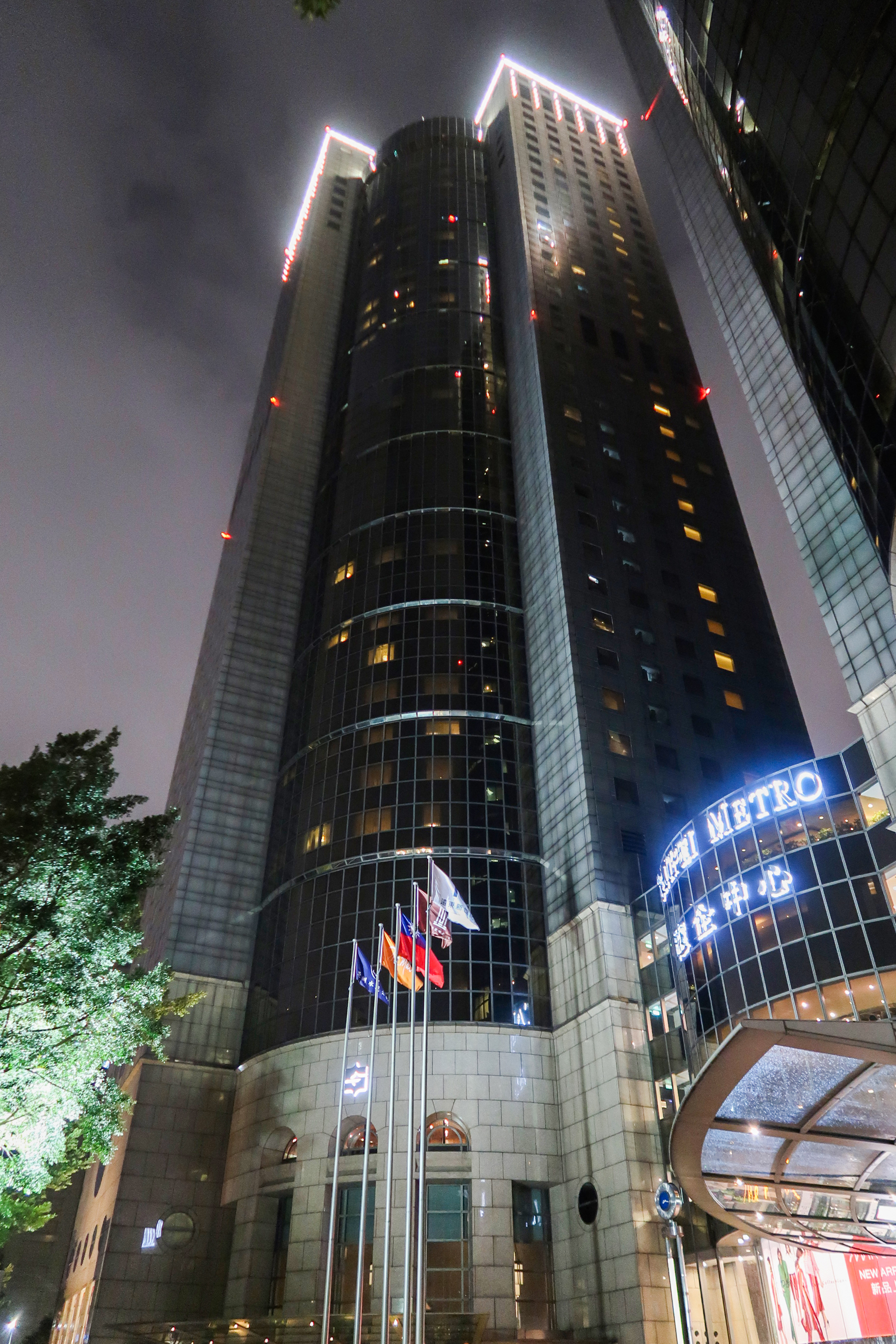
Shangri-La Far Eastern, Taipei

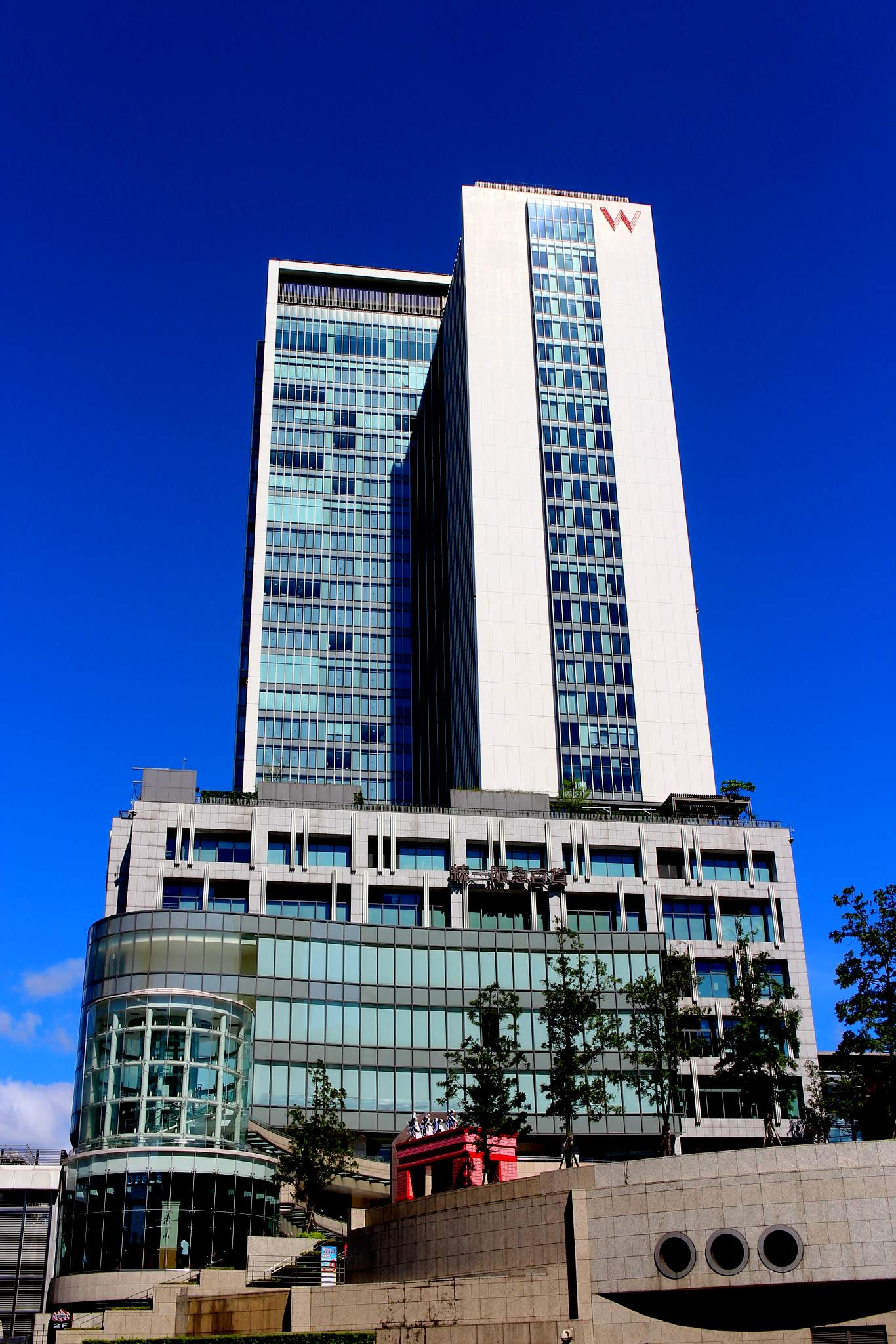
W Taipei

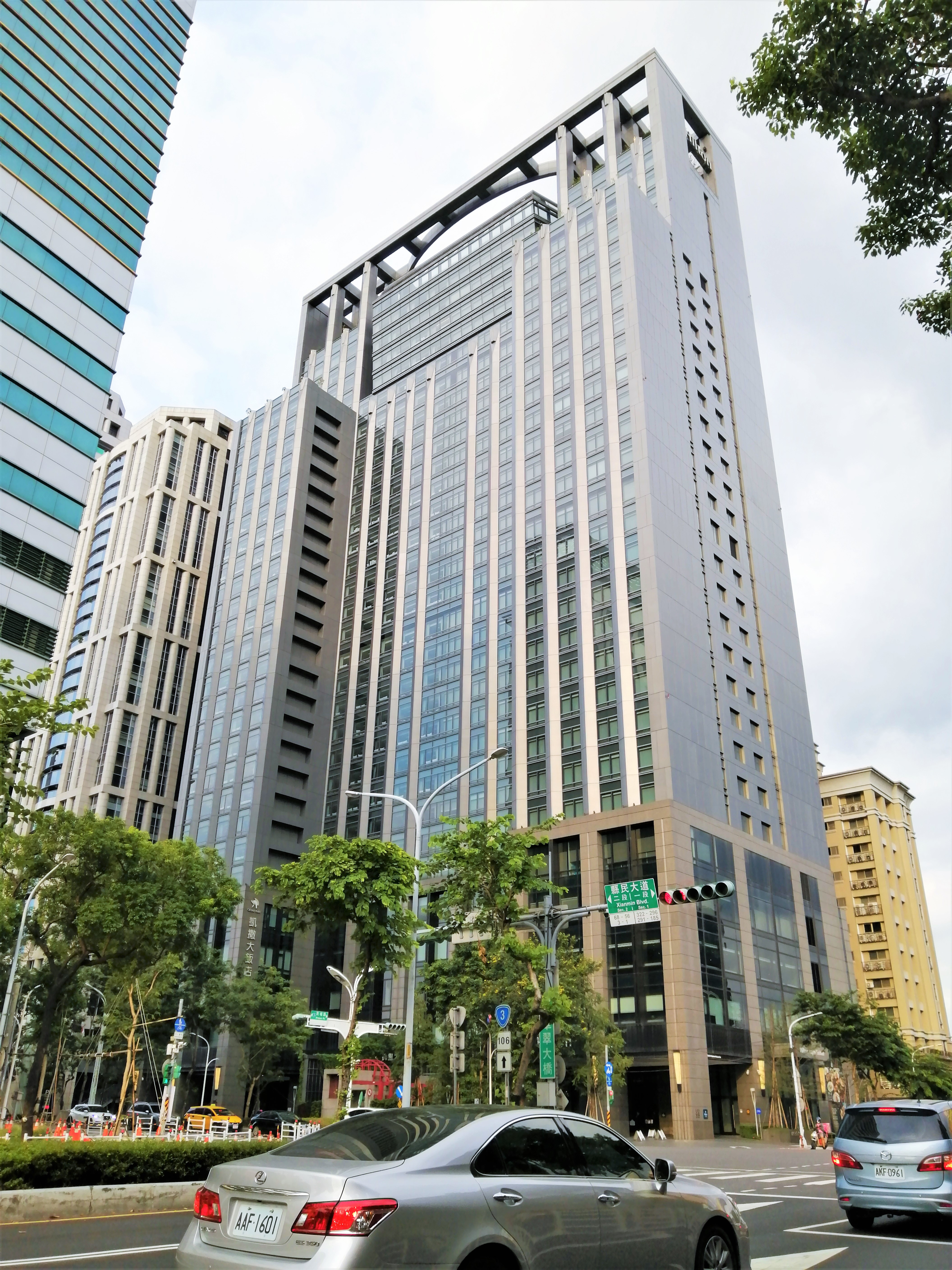
Caesar Park Hotel Banqiao

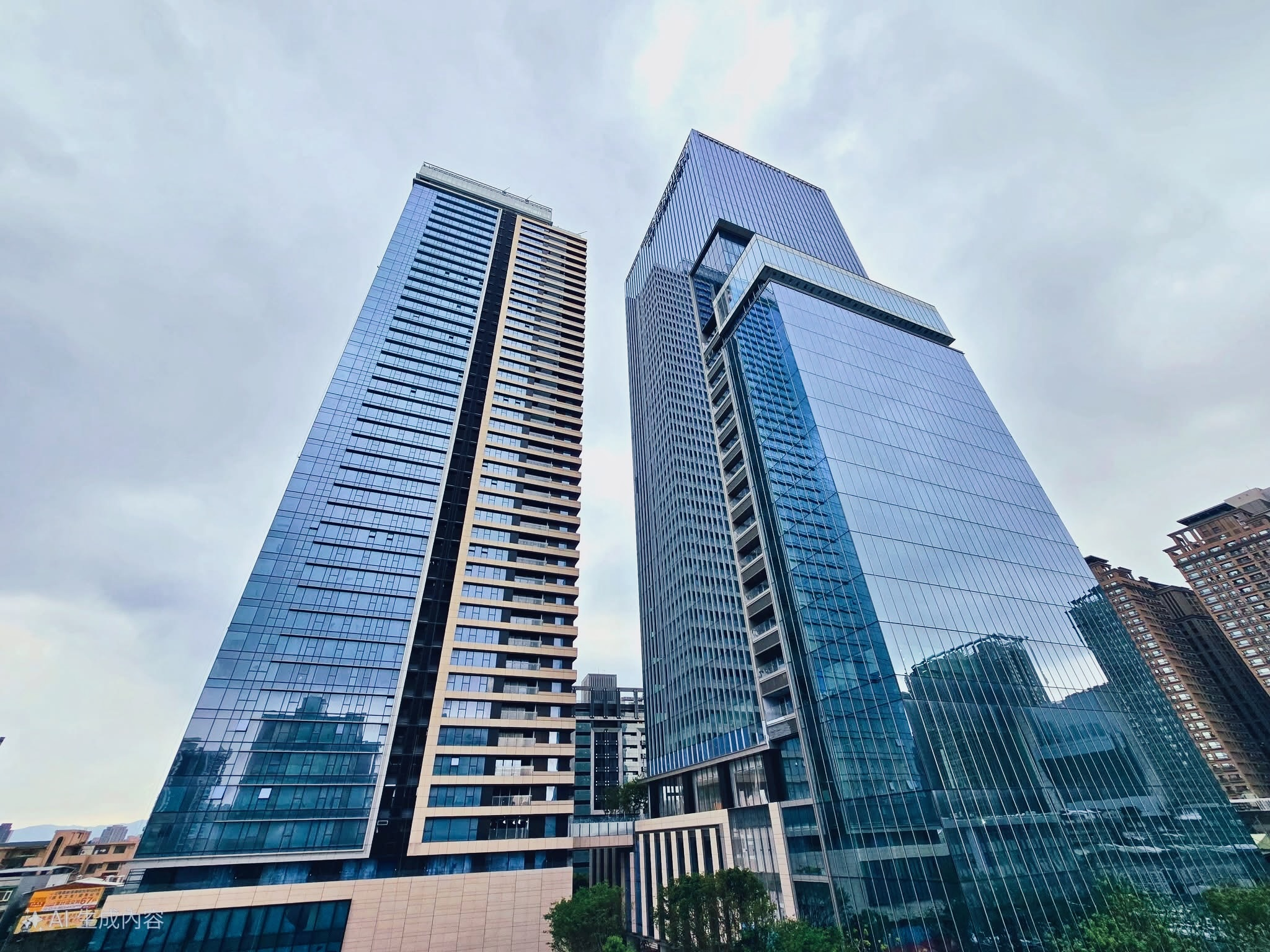
Le Méridien Taipei Banqiao

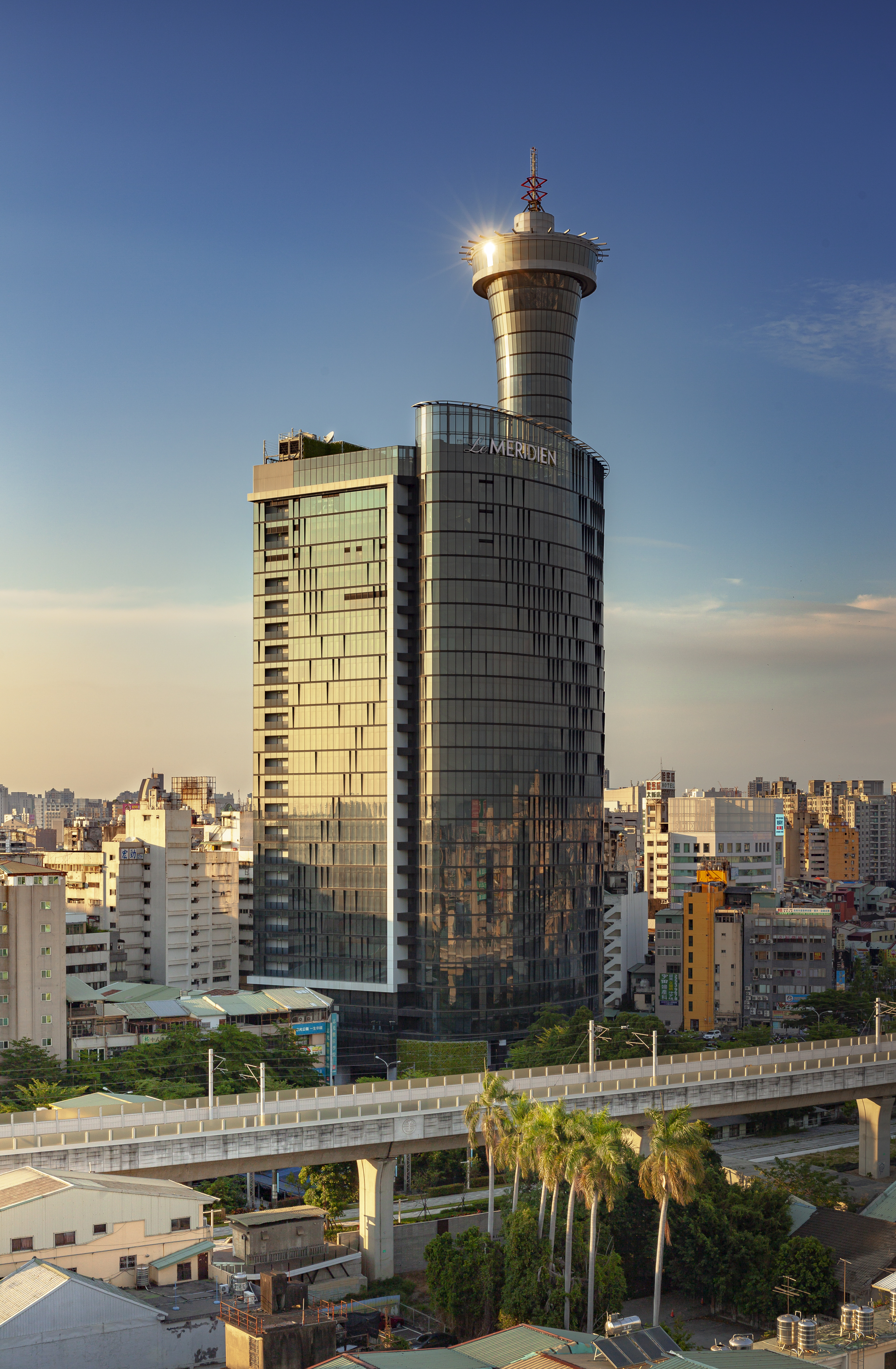
Le Meridien Taichung

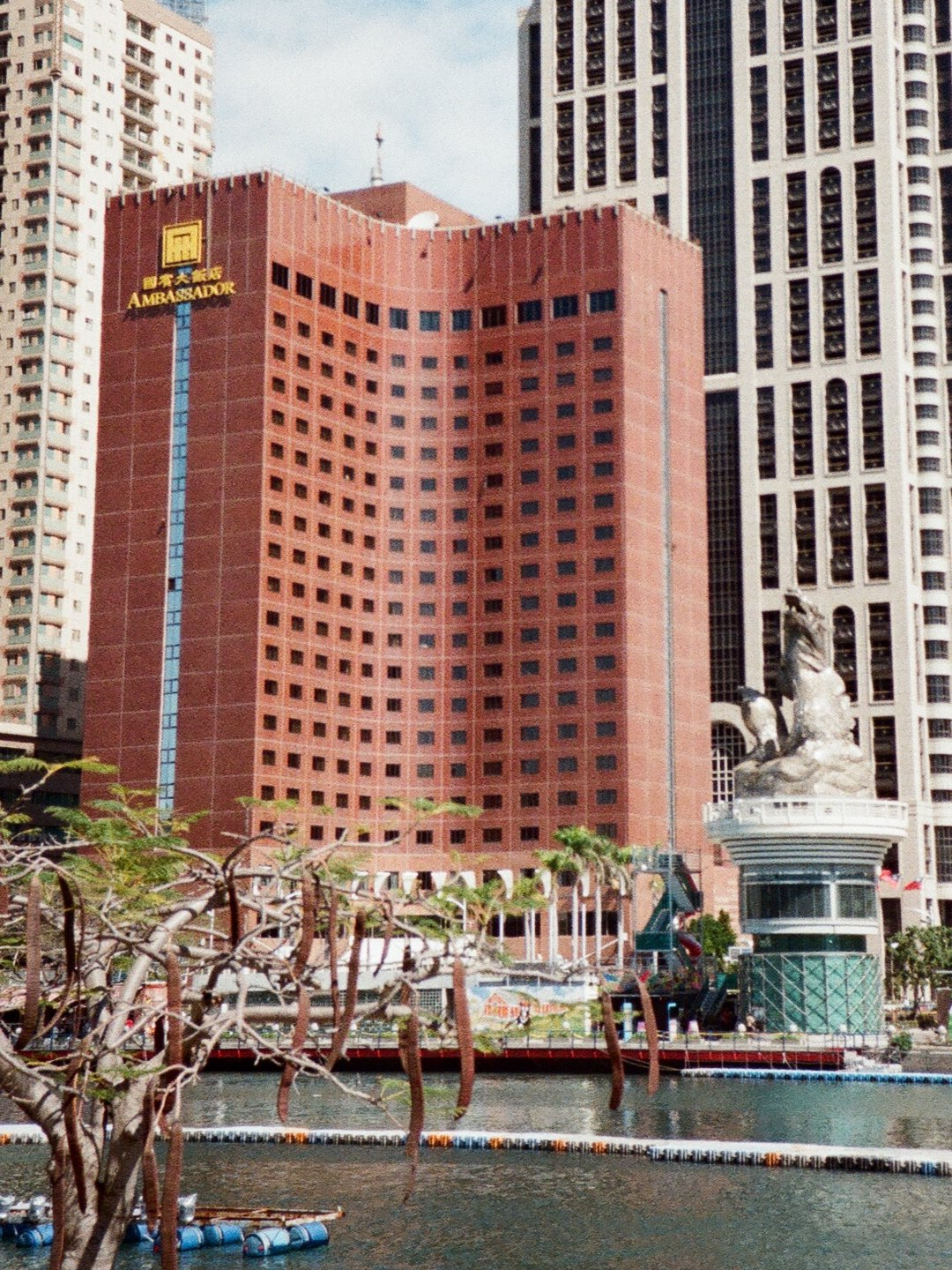
Ambassador Hotel Kaohsiung

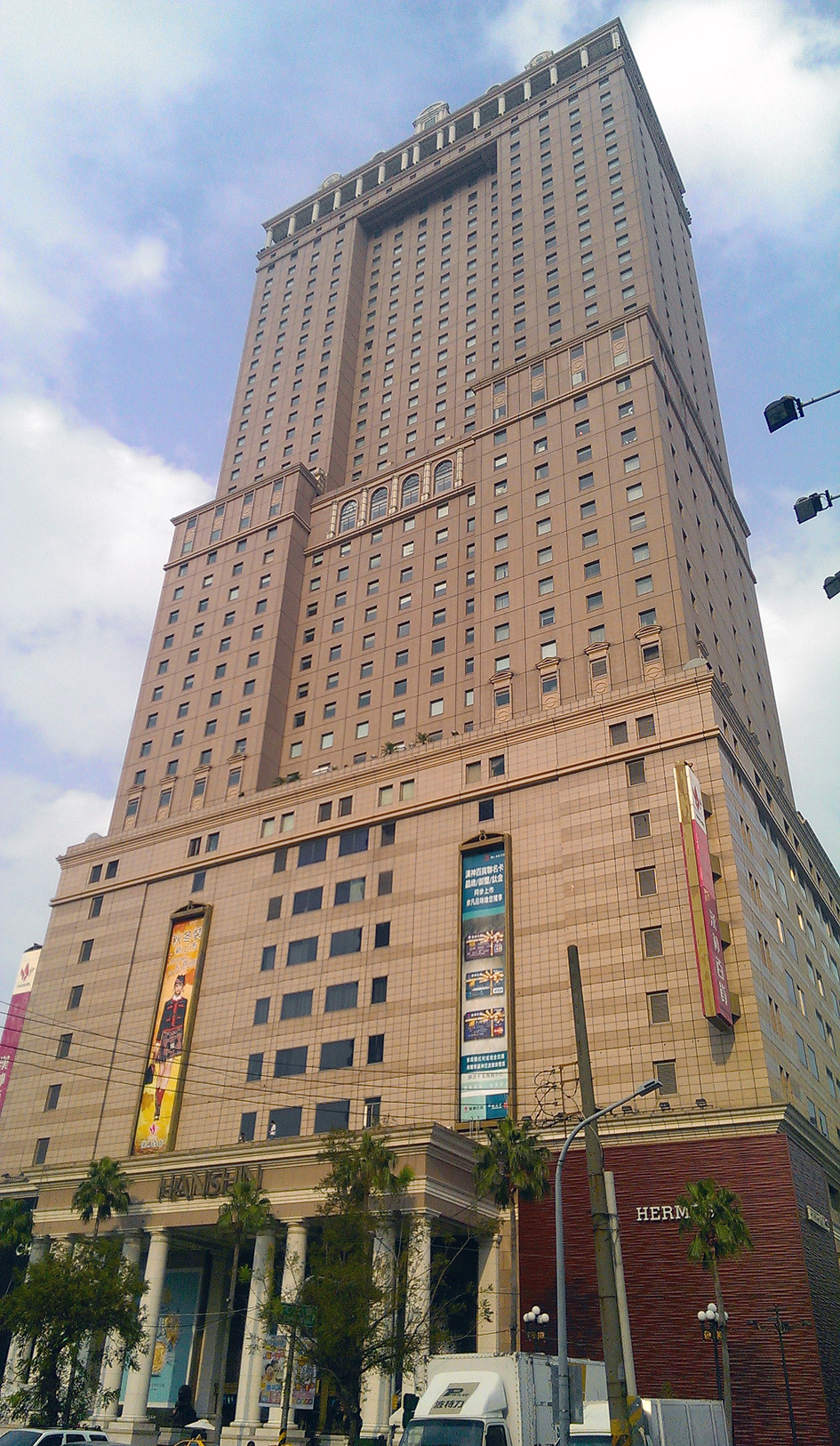
Grand Hi-Lai Hotel

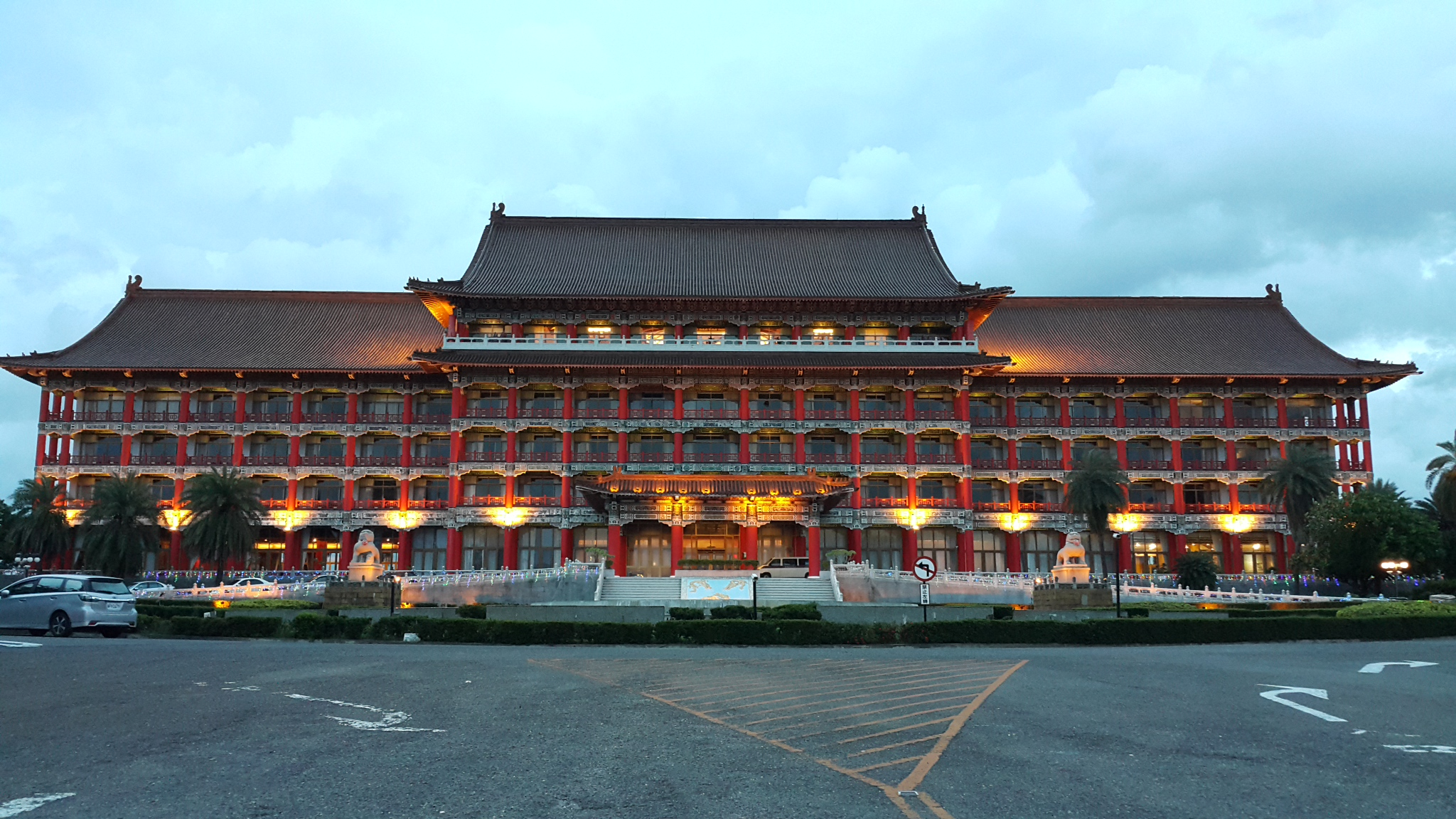
Kaohsiung Grand Hotel

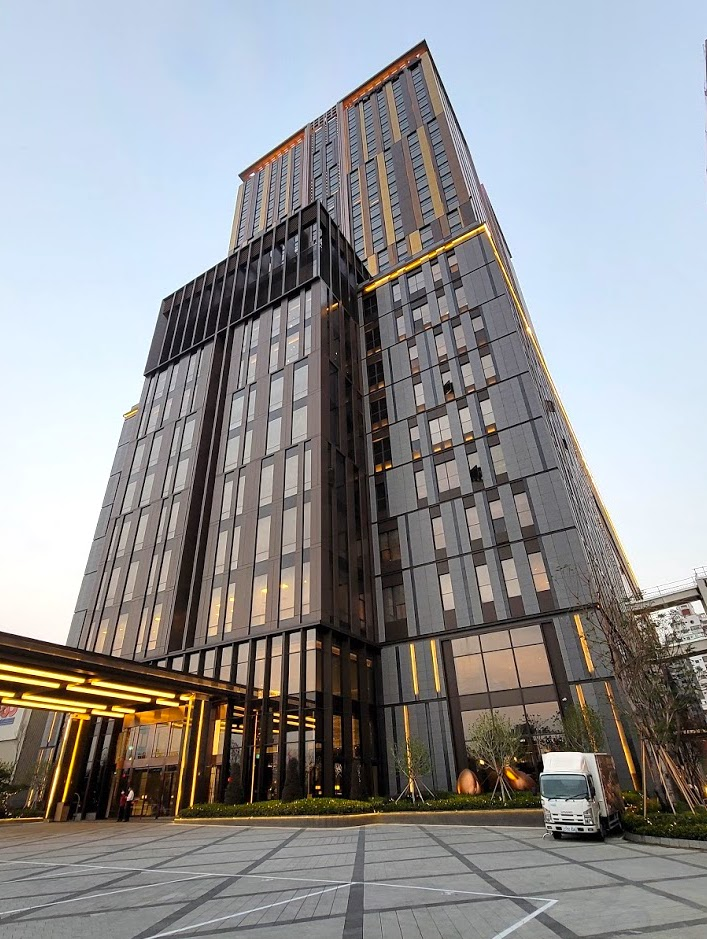
Kaohsiung Marriott Hotel

== See also ==
- Lists of hotels – an index of hotel list articles on Wikipedia
