= E Sky Mall =

Shopping mall in Gushan, Kaohsiung, Taiwan

- 義享時尚廣場

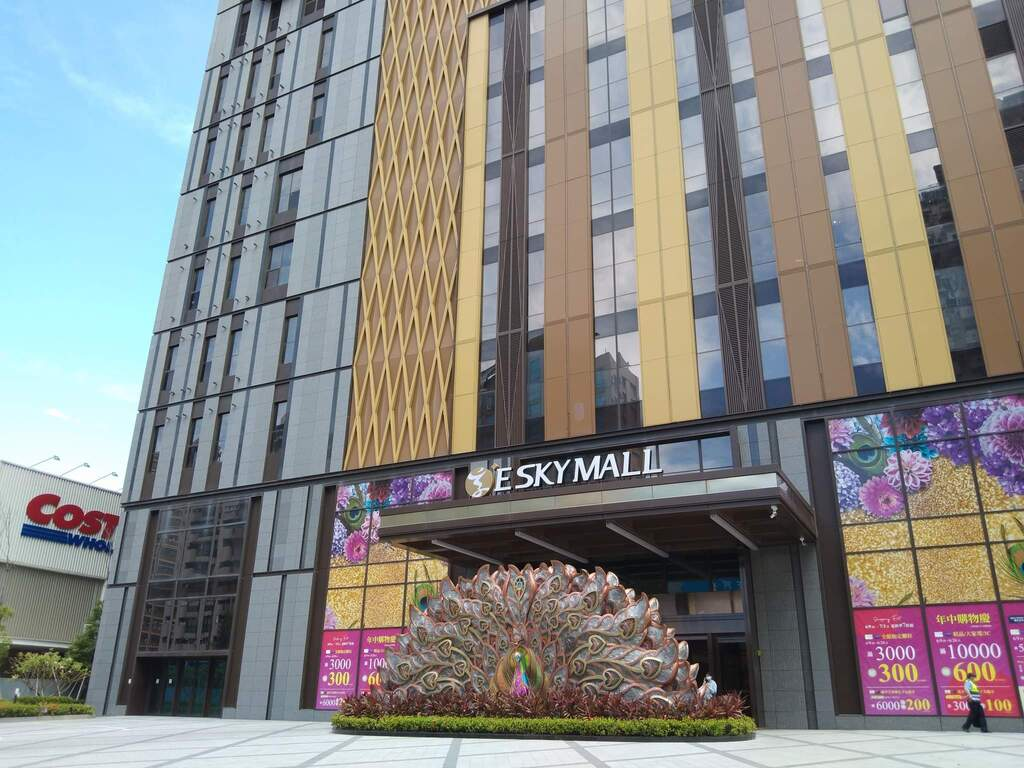
- Location: No. 115, Dashun 1st Road, Gushan District, Kaohsiung, Taiwan
- Coordinates: 22°39′24″N 120°18′24″E
- Opened: April 3, 2021
- Num. of stores: 308
- Floors: 7 floors above ground 2 floors below ground
- Public transit: Aozihdi metro station
- Website: https://www.esky-mall.com.tw/

E Sky Mall (Chinese: 義享時尚廣場) is a shopping center located in Gushan District, Kaohsiung, Taiwan. The mall was originally expected to open in the summer of 2020, but due to the COVID-19 pandemic, it has been postponed to start trial operation on 20 March 2021, and officially opened on 3 April 2021. Within walking distance from Aozihdi metro station, the mall occupies the lower floors of Kaohsiung Marriott Hotel and is a part of the E SKY LAND (義享天地) complex.

== Gallery ==
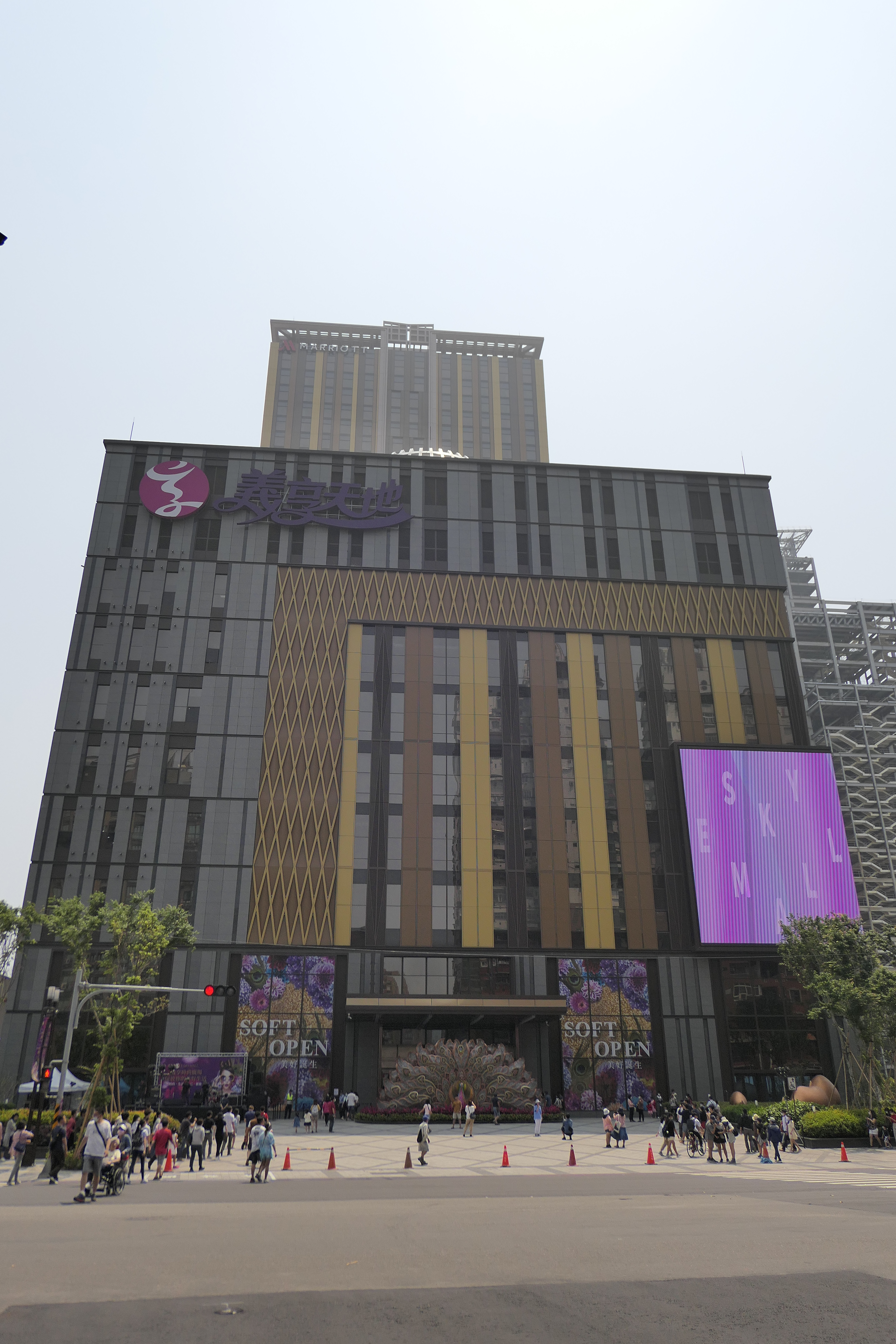
Exterior

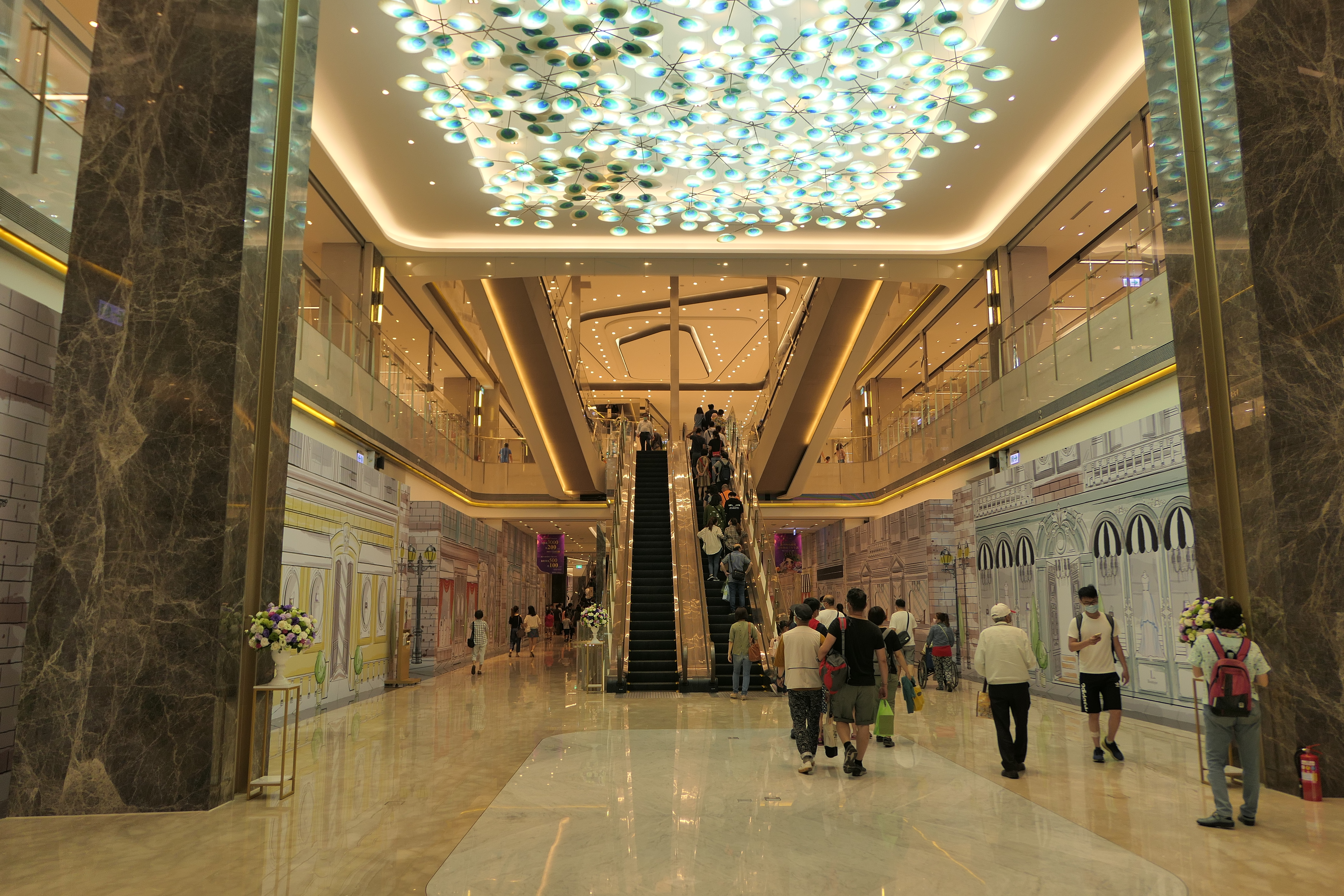
Level 1

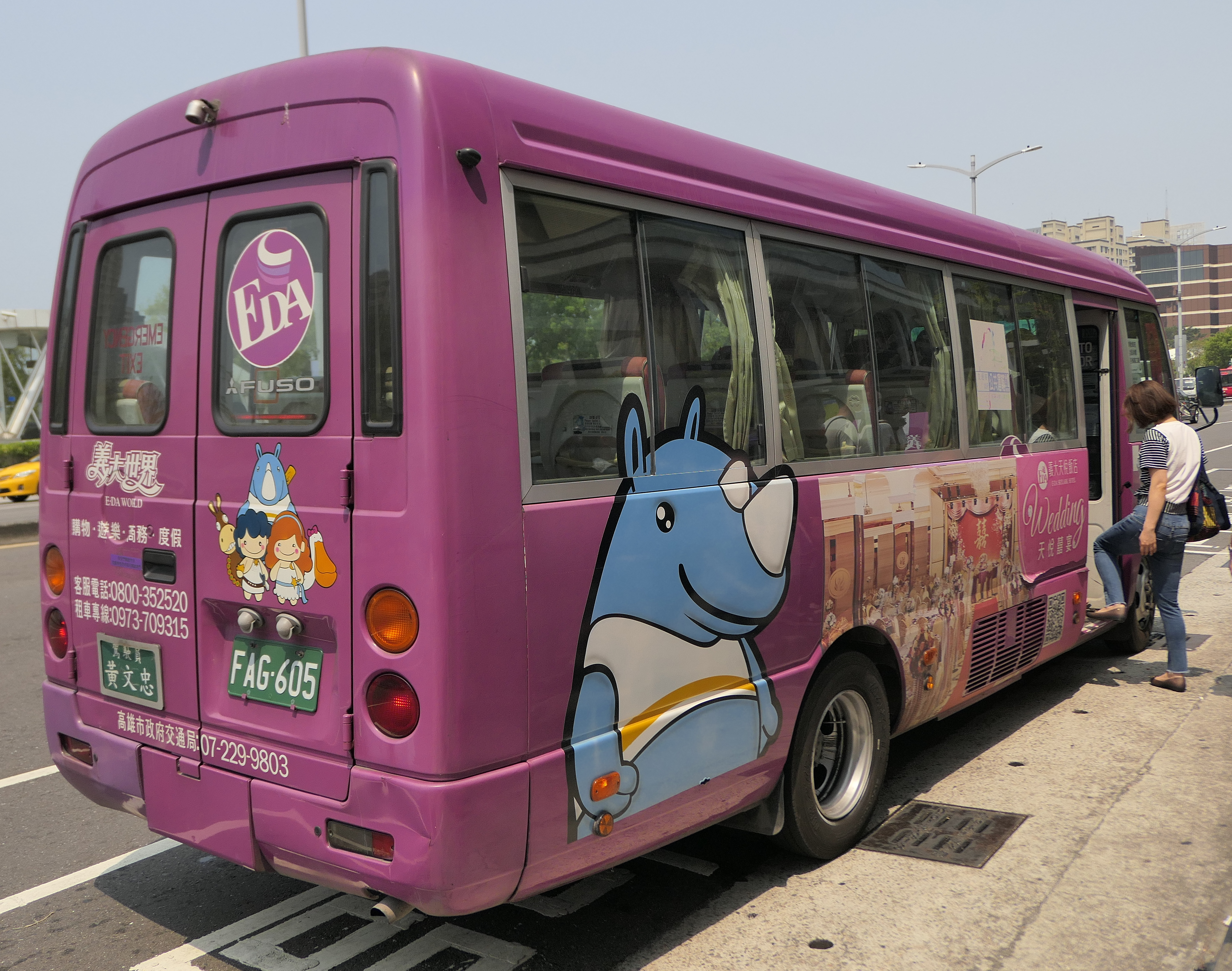
E Sky Land free shuttle bus

== See also ==
- List of tourist attractions in Taiwan
- Kaohsiung Marriott Hotel
