= Howard Plaza Hotel Kaohsiung =

Skyscraper hotel in Sinsing, Kaohsiung, Taiwan

- 高雄福華大飯店
- Interactive map of the Howard Plaza Hotel Kaohsiung area

General information
- Type: hotel
- Location: No.311, Chi-Hsien 1st Road, Sinsing District, Kaohsiung, Taiwan
- Coordinates: 22.6341°N 120.3082°E
- Completed: 1996

Height
- Roof: 356 ft (109 m)

Technical details
- Floor count: 30

Website
- Official website

The Howard Plaza Hotel Kaohsiung (traditional Chinese: 高雄福華大飯店; simplified Chinese: 高雄福华大饭店; pinyin: Gāoxióng Fúhuá Dà Fàndiàn) is a skyscraper hotel completed in 1996 in Sinsing District, Kaohsiung, Taiwan. The roof height of the building is 356 ft (109 m), and it comprises 30 floors above ground.

== The Hotel ==
The location of the hotel is situated in the Kaohsiung city center, with close proximity to tourist attractions such as Liuhe Night Market and Hong Fa Temple. The five-star hotel has a total of 283 rooms including premium suites, themed restaurants, one café and a bar. It also offers multi-functional conference rooms and private rooms, with a banquet hall with a capacity of 300 people. The hotel also features an outdoor swimming pool, and a splash pool located on the 10th floor with city views as well as a Fitness Center equipped with comprehensive sport facilities and sauna.

=== Restaurants & Bars ===
- Champs-Élysées: Western-style restaurant on the 5th floor offering light meals, grilled beef steak, fried short ribs with a salad bar.
- Yangtse River: Chinese restaurant located on the 6th floor featuring traditional Shanghai cuisine as well as Roast Duck.
- Pearl River: Chinese restaurant located on the 3rd floor serving Cantonese and Teochew cuisine.
- Smile One Hot Pot Restaurant: Hot pot restaurant located on the 30th floor with views of the city.
- HOVII CAFE: Offers freshly baked pastries and beverages.

== Gallery ==
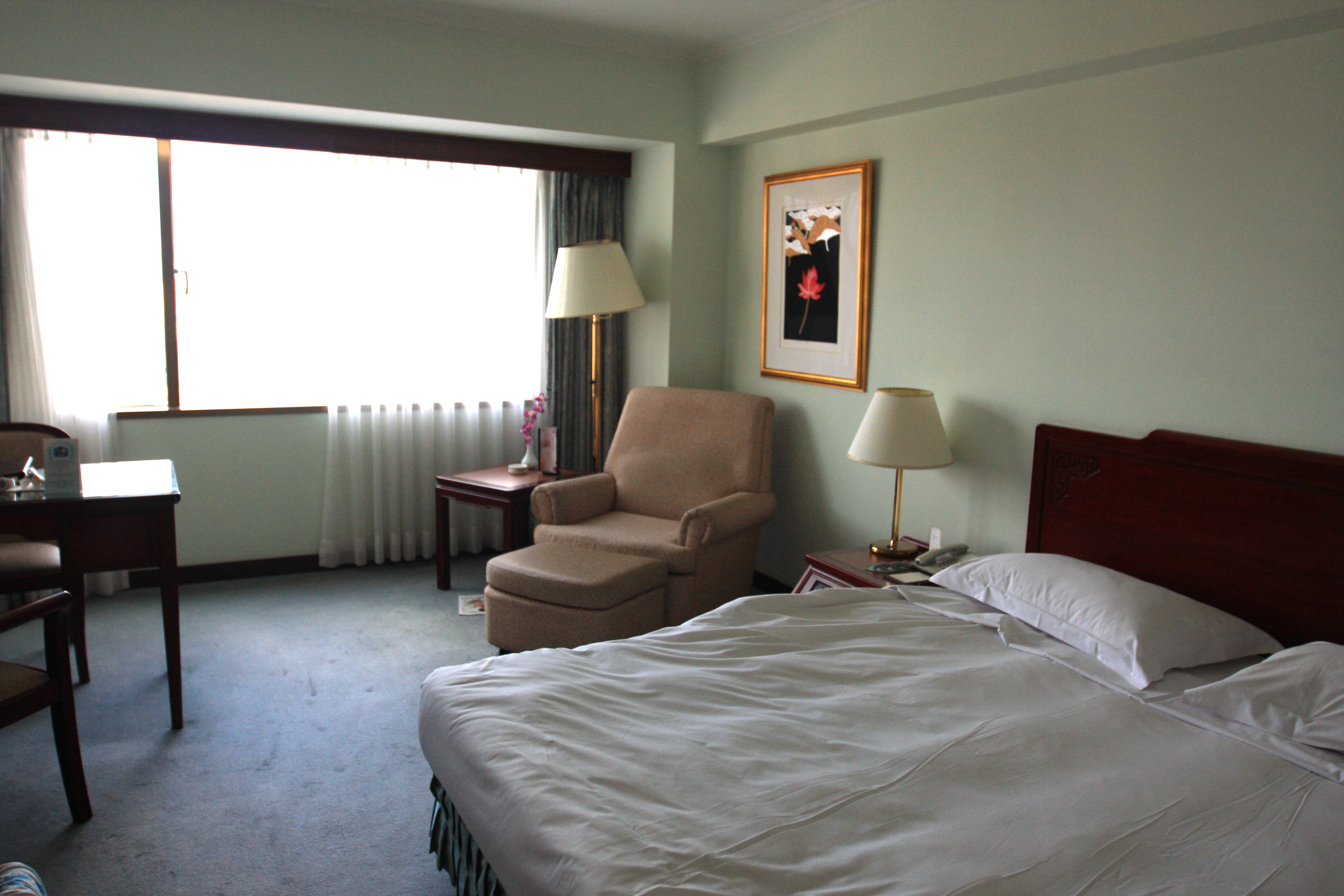
Room

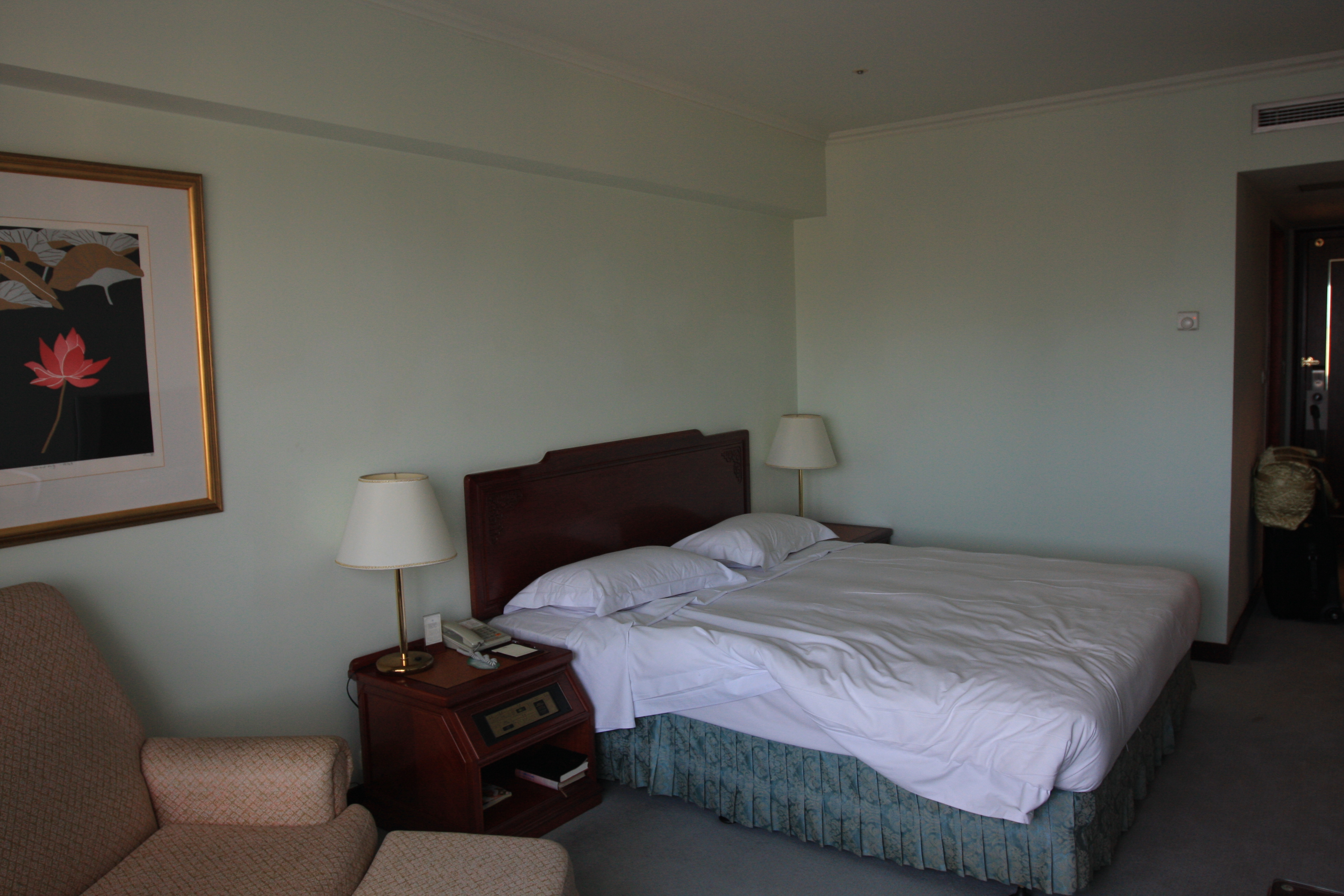

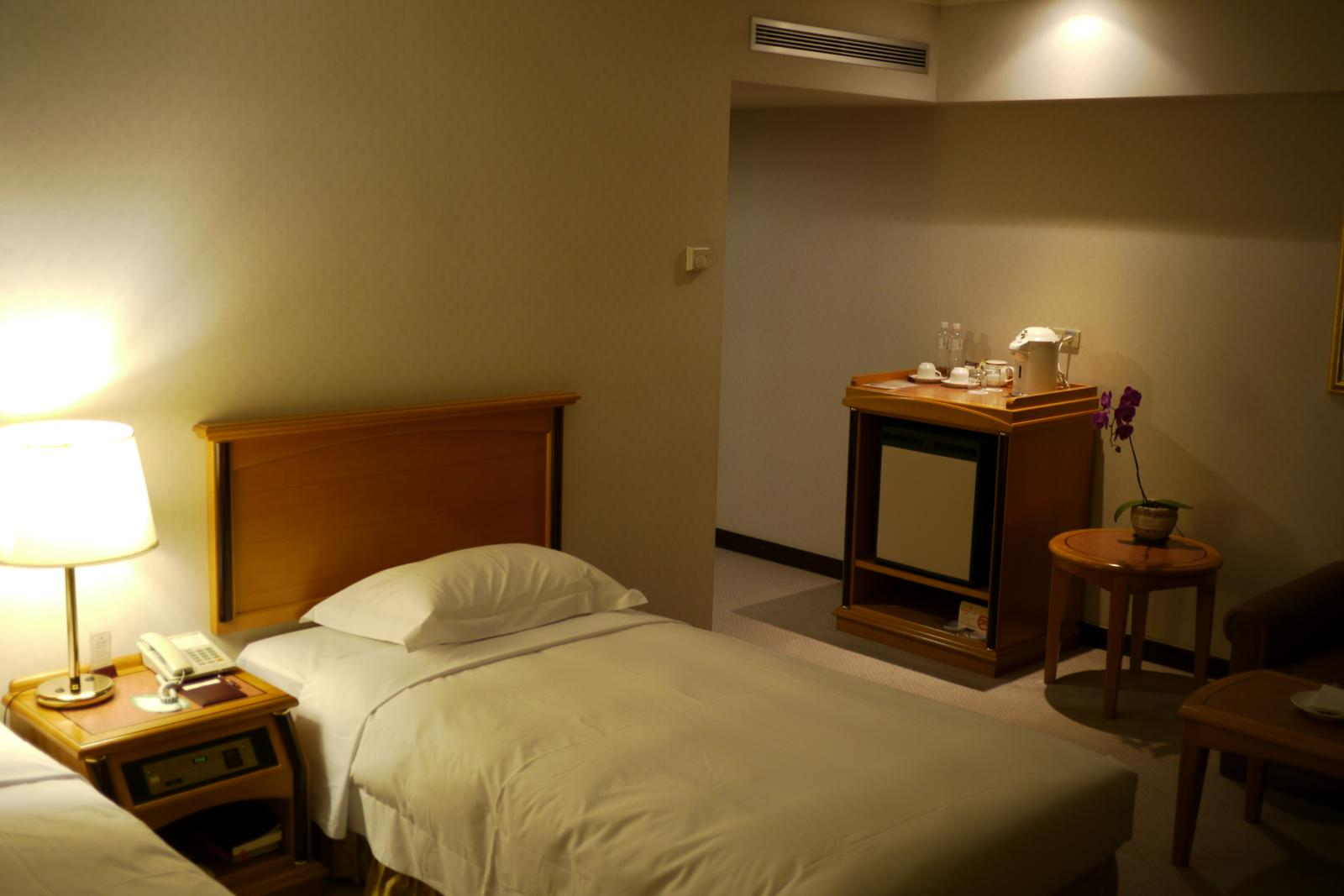

== See also ==
- Han-Hsien International Hotel
- Kaohsiung Grand Hotel
- Kaohsiung Marriott Hotel
