= Le Méridien Taipei Banqiao =

Skyscraper hotel in Banqiao, New Taipei

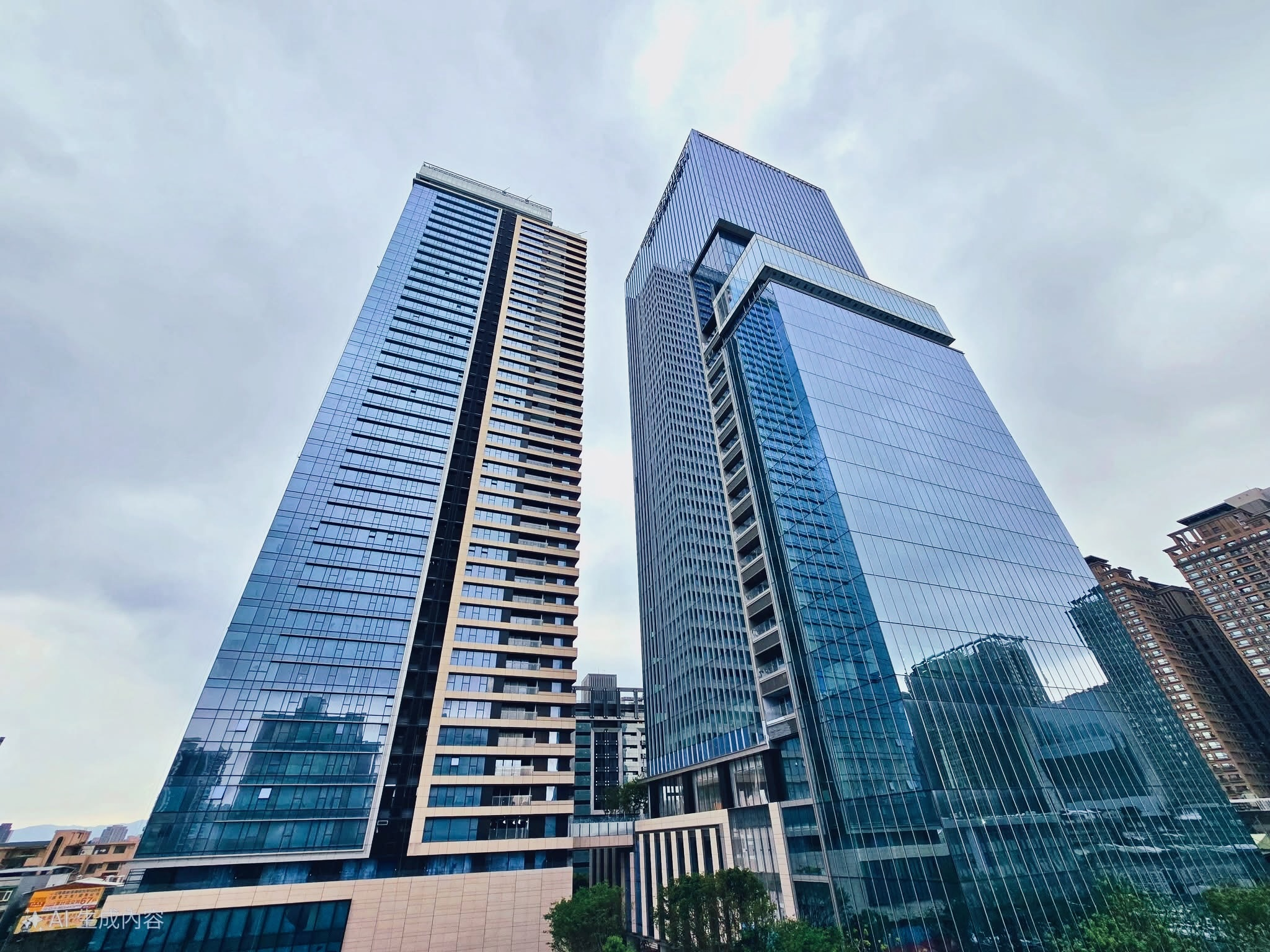
- Hotel chain: Le Méridien

General information
- Location: No. 220, Section 1, Zhongshan Road, Banqiao District, New Taipei City, Taiwan
- Coordinates: 25°0′50″N 121°28′17″E
- Opening: 15 July 2026

Height
- Height: 145.2-metre (476 ft)

Technical details
- Floor count: 31

Design and construction
- Architect: Handel Architects
- Developer: Forworld Group

Other information
- Number of rooms: 236
- Number of restaurants: 4

Website
- Le Méridien Taipei Banqiao

The Le Méridien Taipei Banqiao is a hotel tower located at No. 220, Section 1, Zhongshan Road, Banqiao District, New Taipei City, Taiwan. The hotel is a part of the Le M Residence development complex developed by the Forworld Group and designed by Handel Architects. The hotel opened on 15 July 2026.

== Location ==
The 31-storey, 145.2-metre (476 ft) skyscraper is located in the heart of the Xinban Special District close to the New Taipei City Hall and Banqiao station. The hotel is 34-minute drive away from the Taipei Songshan Airport and 38-minute drive away from the Taoyuan International Airport.

== Facilities ==
The hotel tower includes 236 rooms. The hotel facilities include two main restaurants – French restaurant "Belle Époque Brasserie" and Chinese restaurant "Jasmin" and two bars – "Latitude 25" and "LUMI Bar".

== Transportation ==
The hotel is a 3-minute walk away from Banxin metro station on the Circular Line.

== See also ==
- List of tallest buildings in New Taipei
- List of hotels in Taiwan
