= Four Points by Sheraton Linkou =

Skyscraper hotel in Linkou, New Taipei

- Hotel chain: Four Points by Sheraton

General information
- Location: No. 1, Section 1, Wenhua 3rd Road, Linkou District, New Taipei City, Taiwan
- Coordinates: 25°3′58″N 121°21′40″E
- Opening: 11 December 2018

Height
- Height: 90-metre (300 ft)

Technical details
- Floor count: 18
- Floor area: 67,726 m (222,198 ft)

Design and construction
- Developer: YeaShin Group

Other information
- Number of rooms: 165
- Number of suites: 13
- Number of restaurants: 2

Website
- Four Points by Sheraton Linkou

The Four Points by Sheraton Linkou is a hotel tower located at No. 1, Section 1, Wenhua 3rd Road, Linkou District in New Taipei City, Taiwan. The hotel opened on 11 December 2018.

In October 2022, former NBA player Dwight Howard stayed at the hotel after joining the Taiwanese professional basketball team Taoyuan Leopards of the T1 League.

== Location ==
The 18-storey, 90-metre (300 ft) highrise is located in the heart of the Linkou New Town close to the Mitsui Outlet Park Linkou. The hotel is 34-minute drive away from the Taoyuan International Airport and 32-minute drive away from the Taipei Songshan Airport.

== Facilities ==
The hotel tower includes 165 rooms with 13 suites. The hotel facilities include two restaurants – "The Eatery" and "China Spice" and a bar.

== Transportation ==
The hotel is a 2-minute walk away from Linkou metro station on the Taoyuan Airport MRT.

== See also ==
- List of tallest buildings in New Taipei
- List of hotels in Taiwan
