= Fuji Grand Hotel =

Luxury hotel located in Xizhi, New Taipei, Taiwan

- 富士大飯店
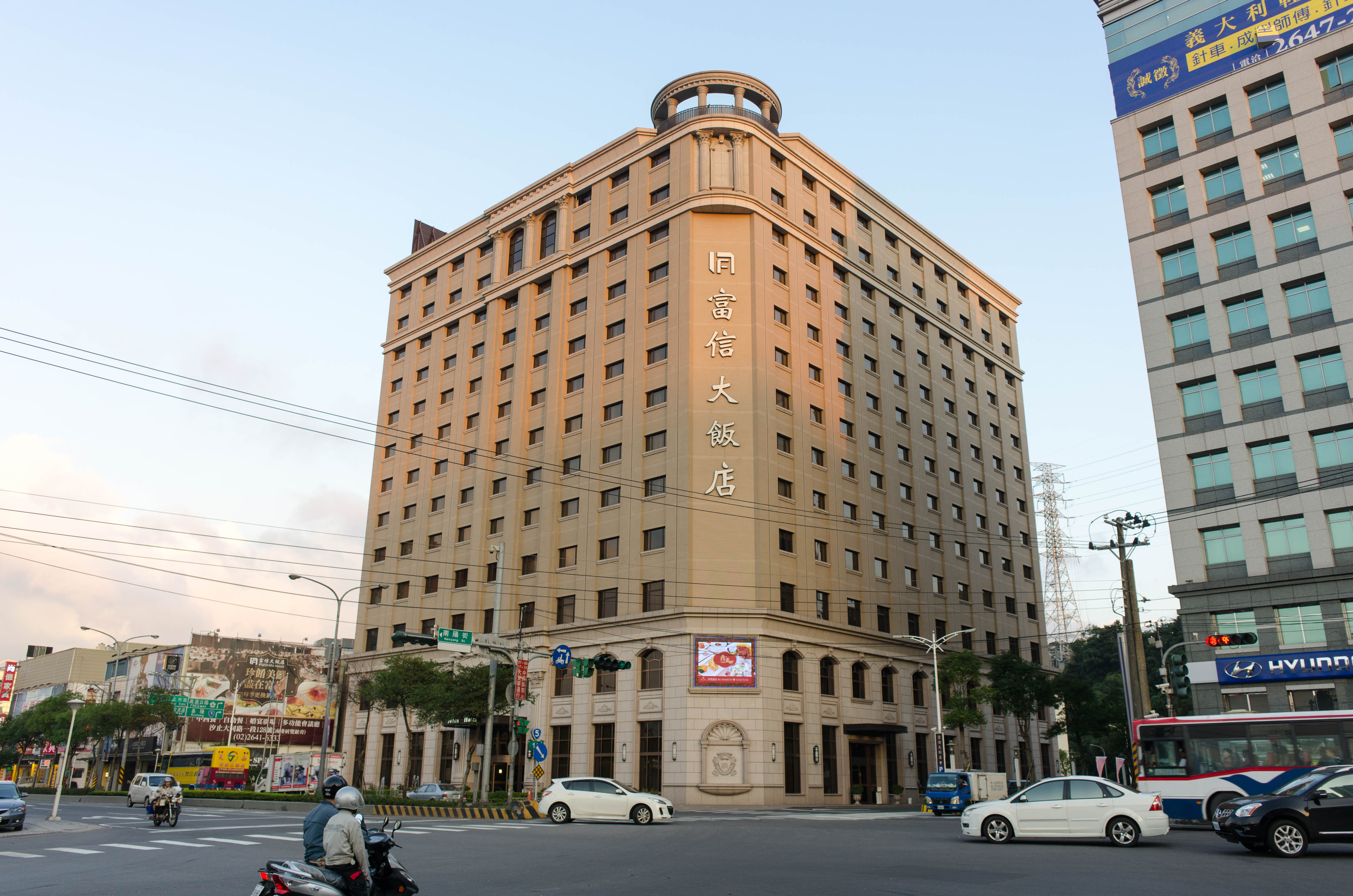
- Interactive map of the Fuji Grand Hotel area

General information
- Status: Completed
- Type: Hotel
- Location: No. 128, Section 1, Datong Road, Xizhi District, New Taipei, Taiwan
- Coordinates: 25°3′19″N 121°37′53″E
- Opening: June 1, 2022

Technical details
- Floor count: 13

Other information
- Number of rooms: 214

Website
- Fuji Grand Hotel

Fuji Grand Hotel (Chinese: 富士大飯店) is a five-star luxury hotel located in Xizhi District, New Taipei, Taiwan. Opened on June 1, 2022, the hotel has 214 rooms and suites and has facilities such as a business center, sauna, fitness room, karaoke, chess room and lounge. The hotel was originally named Fushin Hotel Taipei but was later changed to its current name.

== Restaurants ==
- Li Chinese Restaurant: A Cantonese restaurant providing dim sum
- Fuji Café: A café providing diverse food such as pastries and coffee

== Location ==
The hotel is located at the traffic center of Nangang Software Park, Taipei Nangang Exhibition Center and Xizhi Science Park.

=== Public transportation ===
- Taipei Metro
  - Bannan line: Taipei Nangang Exhibition Center metro station
