= Kaohsiung Marriott Hotel =

Hotel in Gushan, Kaohsiung, Taiwan

Kaohsiung Marriott Hotel 高雄萬豪酒店
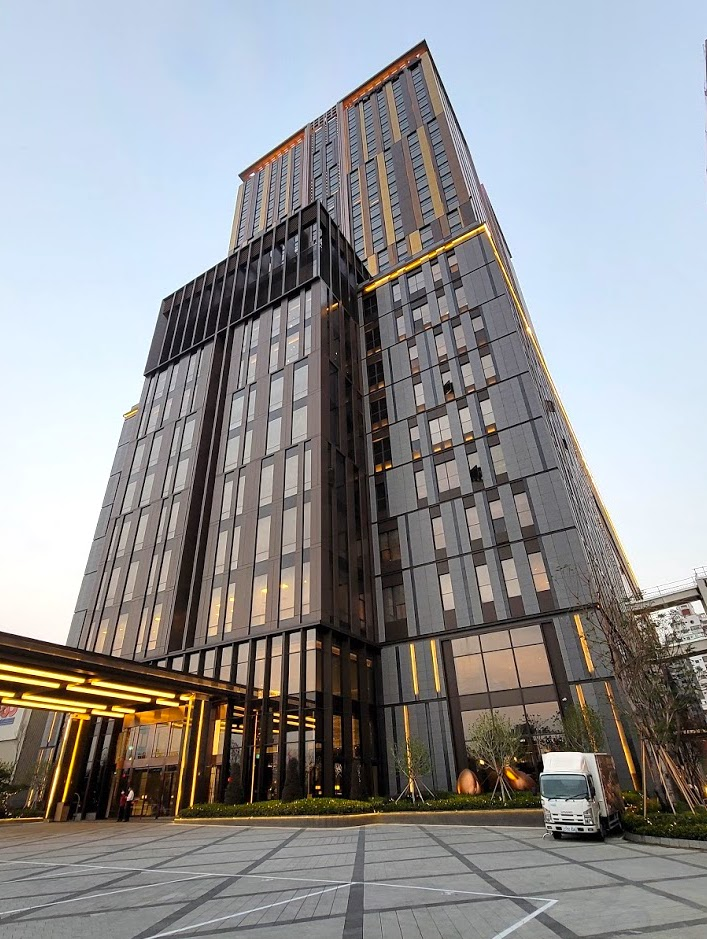

General information
- Type: Hotel
- Location: No. 222, Longdexin Road, Gushan District, Kaohsiung, Taiwan
- Coordinates: 22°39′17″N 120°18′24″E
- Completed: 2020

Height
- Architectural: 156 m (512 ft)

Technical details
- Floor count: 31
- Floor area: 257,007.74 m^{2} (2,766,408.3 sq ft)

The Kaohsiung Marriott Hotel (traditional Chinese: 高雄萬豪酒店; simplified Chinese: 高雄万豪酒店; pinyin: Gāoxióng Wànháo Jiǔdiàn) is a 156 m (512 ft) skyscraper hotel completed in 2020 in Gushan District, Kaohsiung, Taiwan. The building has a floor area of 257,007.74 m^{2} (2,766,408.3 sq ft), and it comprises 31 floors above ground and six basement levels. The building is phase one of the E SKY LAND complex. Operated by Marriott Hotels & Resorts, the hotel started trial operations on December 25, 2020 and started full operations in 2021.

== Facilities ==
The hotel has a total of 700 rooms plus 94 premium suites, 8 themed restaurants, one café and a bar. It also offers 18 meeting rooms, with a total event space of 55,035 sq ft (5,112.9 m^{2}).

=== Restaurants & Bars ===
- M-Chef Steak & Teppanyaki: Restaurant serving premium prime cut steak and red wine.
- Huang Hao Chinese Restaurant: Chinese restaurant featuring traditional Cantonese cuisine.
- M9 Buffet Restaurant: Buffet offering a wide variety of dishes from around the globe.
- Kyo Raku Japanese Cuisine & Hot Pot: Japanese restaurant offering Japanese hot pot.
- Kyo Kyo Japanese Buffet
- The Lounge: Lounge serving A la carte menu of signature specialties.
- King Chui Hong Kong Cafe: Hong Kong-style café featuring dim sum, beef chow fun and Hong Kong-style milk tea.
- R3 Sky Bar: Sky bar offering cocktails with a panoramic view of Kaohsiung's night skyline.
- Majesty Restaurant: French restaurant featuring curated by internationally acclaimed Michelin three-starred chef-consultant, Thomas Bühner.
- T-Fusion: Coffee house serving hot beverages and pastries.

== See also ==
- List of tallest buildings in Taiwan
- List of tallest buildings in Kaohsiung
- Marriott Hotels & Resorts
- Kaohsiung Grand Hotel
- Han-Hsien International Hotel
- Grand Hi-Lai Hotel
