= Evergreen Laurel Hotel Keelung =

Hotel in Zhongzheng, Keelung, Taiwan

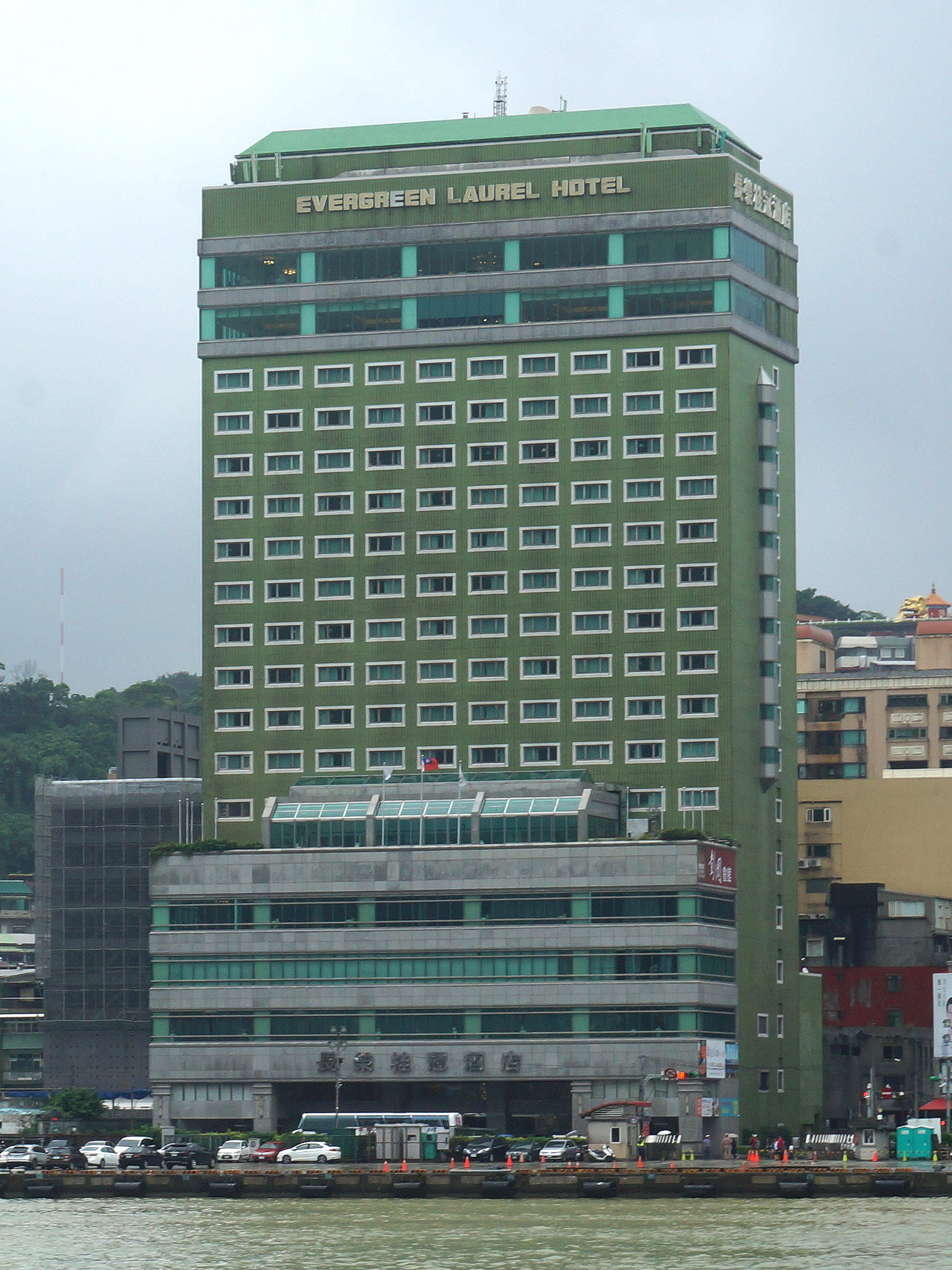

- Location within Taiwan

General information
- Location: No. 62-1, Zhongzheng Road, Zhongzheng District, Keelung, Taiwan
- Coordinates: 25.135198421074584°N 121.74623523985348°E
- Opening: 1998
- Management: Evergreen International Hotels

Technical details
- Floor count: 19

Other information
- Number of rooms: 140
- Number of restaurants: 2

Website
- Evergreen Laurel Hotel Keelung Website

Evergreen Laurel Hotel Keelung (Chinese: 長榮桂冠酒店（基隆）) is a 75 m (246 ft) tall five star hotel located on Zhongzheng Road, Zhongzheng District, Keelung, Taiwan, which opened in 1998.

== Facilities ==
The hotel has 140 guest rooms and 19 floors. The hotel is operated by Evergreen International Hotels. and offers free wifi, a swimming pool as well as free parking.

=== Restaurants & Bars ===
- The Peng's Agora Garden: Chinese restaurant featuring traditional Hunan cuisine, located on the fifth floor.
- Café Laurel: Café located on the 18th and 19th floor with views of the Pacific Ocean as well as Port of Keelung.
- Gourmet Shop: Bakery offering fresh pastries, located on the first floor.
