= W Taipei =

Hotel in Taipei, Taiwan

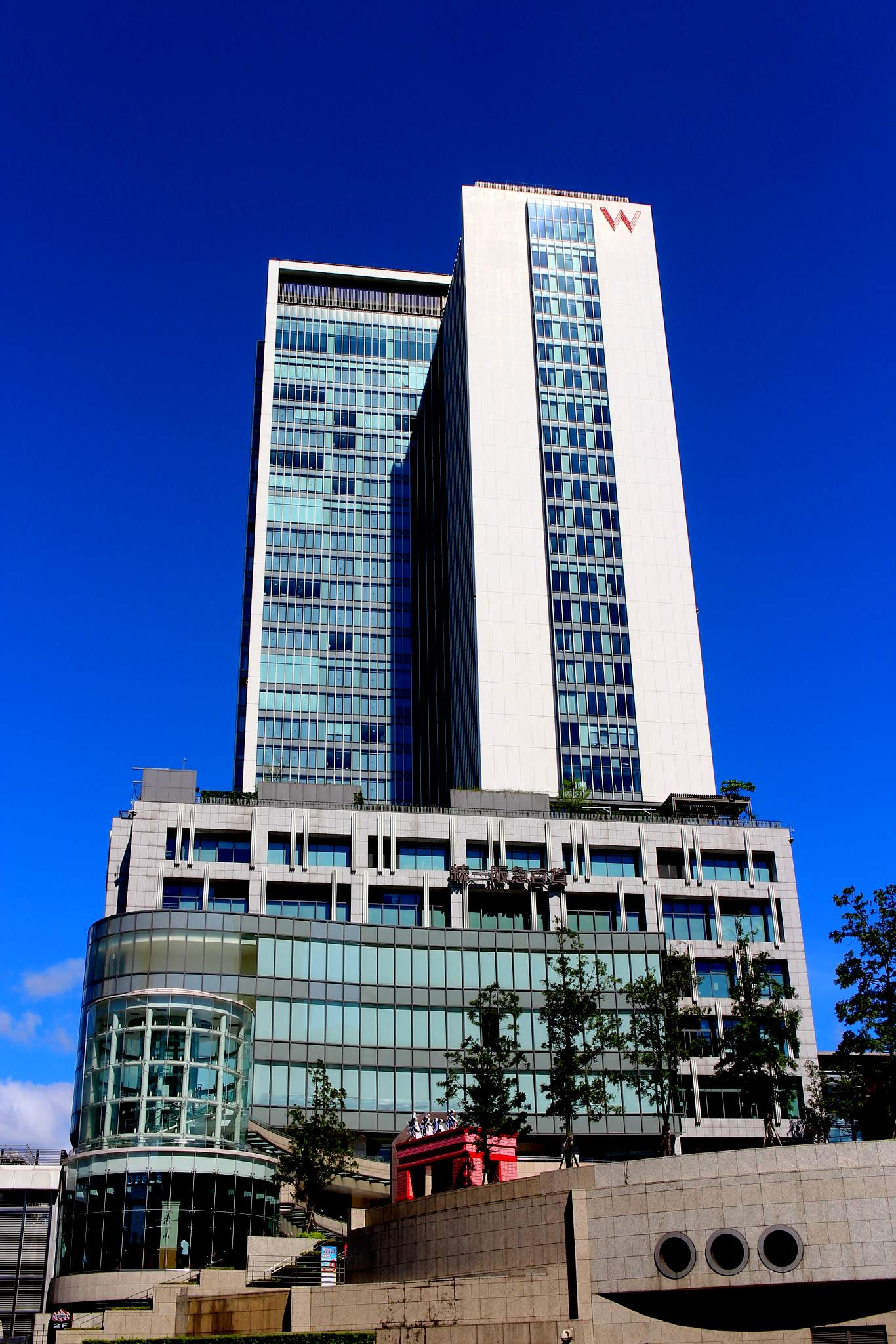

- Location in Taiwan

General information
- Location: Xinyi District, Taipei, Taiwan
- Coordinates: 25°2′25.8″N 121°33′53.28″E
- Operator: W Hotels

Technical details
- Floor count: From 8th to 31st floors of the building
- Floor area: 26,446 m^{2} (284,660 sq ft)

Other information
- Number of rooms: 405

Website
- www.marriott.com/hotels/travel/tpewh-w-taipei/

W Taipei is a five-star luxury hotel in Taipei, Taiwan. Owned by Taiwanese retail conglomerate Uni-president, the hotel occupies the 8th to 31st floors of the Taipei City Hall Bus Station, offering a total of 405 guest rooms. It started trial operations in February 2011, and official operations in March 2011.

== Location ==
W Taipei is located in Xinyi Planning District, the central business district of Taipei and close to venues and tourist attractions such as the Taipei World Trade Center, Taipei International Convention Center, Taipei City Hall, National Sun Yat-sen Memorial Hall and Taipei 101.

== Facilities ==
W Taipei offers two restaurants, a pool bar, and a cocktail lounge, including the classic The Kitchen Table located on the 10th-storey and a Chinese restaurant Yen located on the top floor of the building. Other facilities include the WET Pool, WOOBAR, the AWAY Spa, FIT fitness center and WIRED business center. The exterior was designed by Japanese designer Tadashi Yamane while the interior was designed by GA Design. Other facilities include the WET Bar and WET outdoor pool, located on the 10th floor, which overlooks Taipei 101 and the skyline of the cosmopolitan downtown. The hotel has five restaurants and bars.

== Restaurants & Bars ==
- The Kitchen Table
- WOOBAR
- Yen
- WET Bar

== Gallery ==
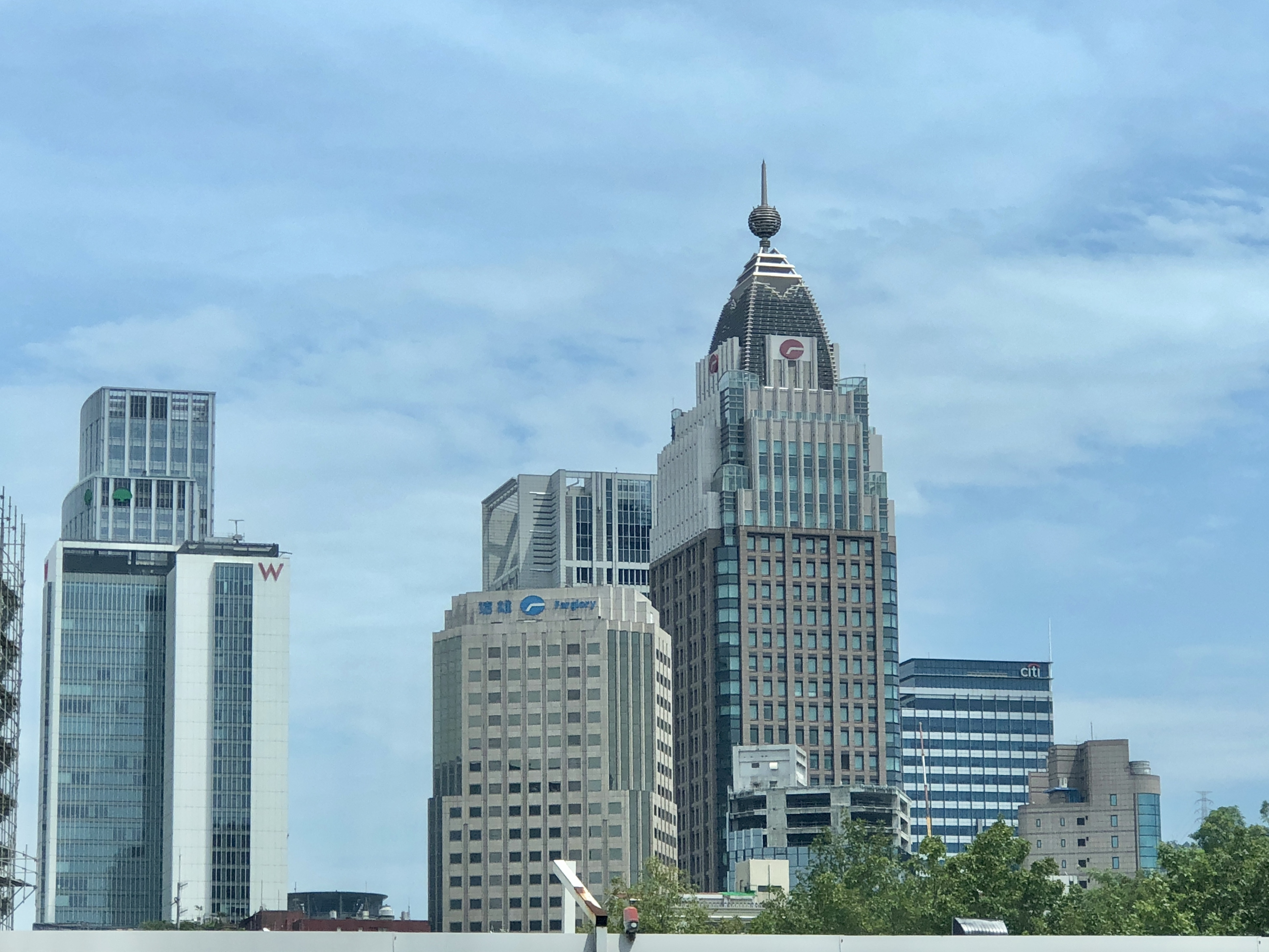
W Taipei viewed from afar

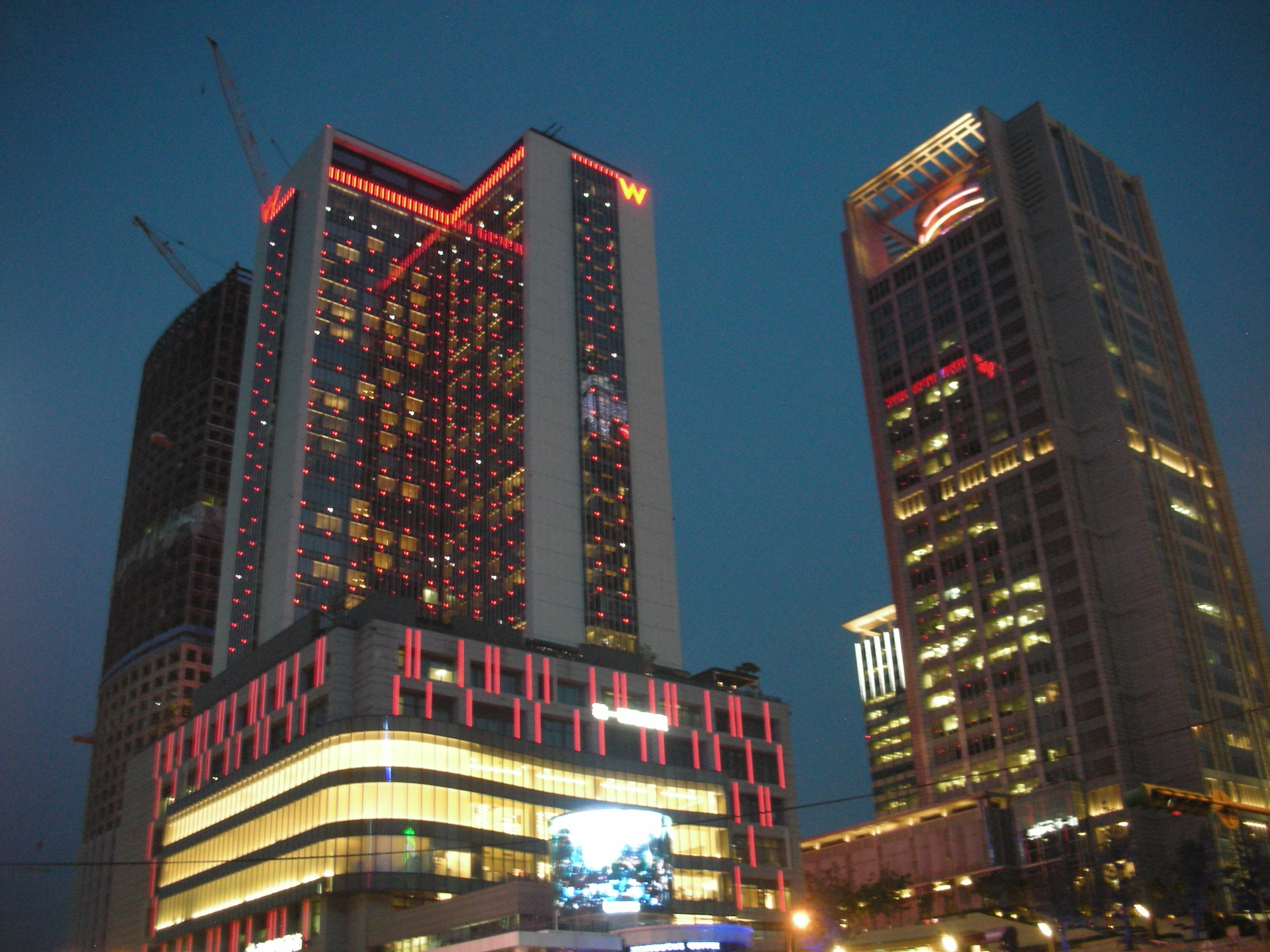
W Taipei and President International Tower at night

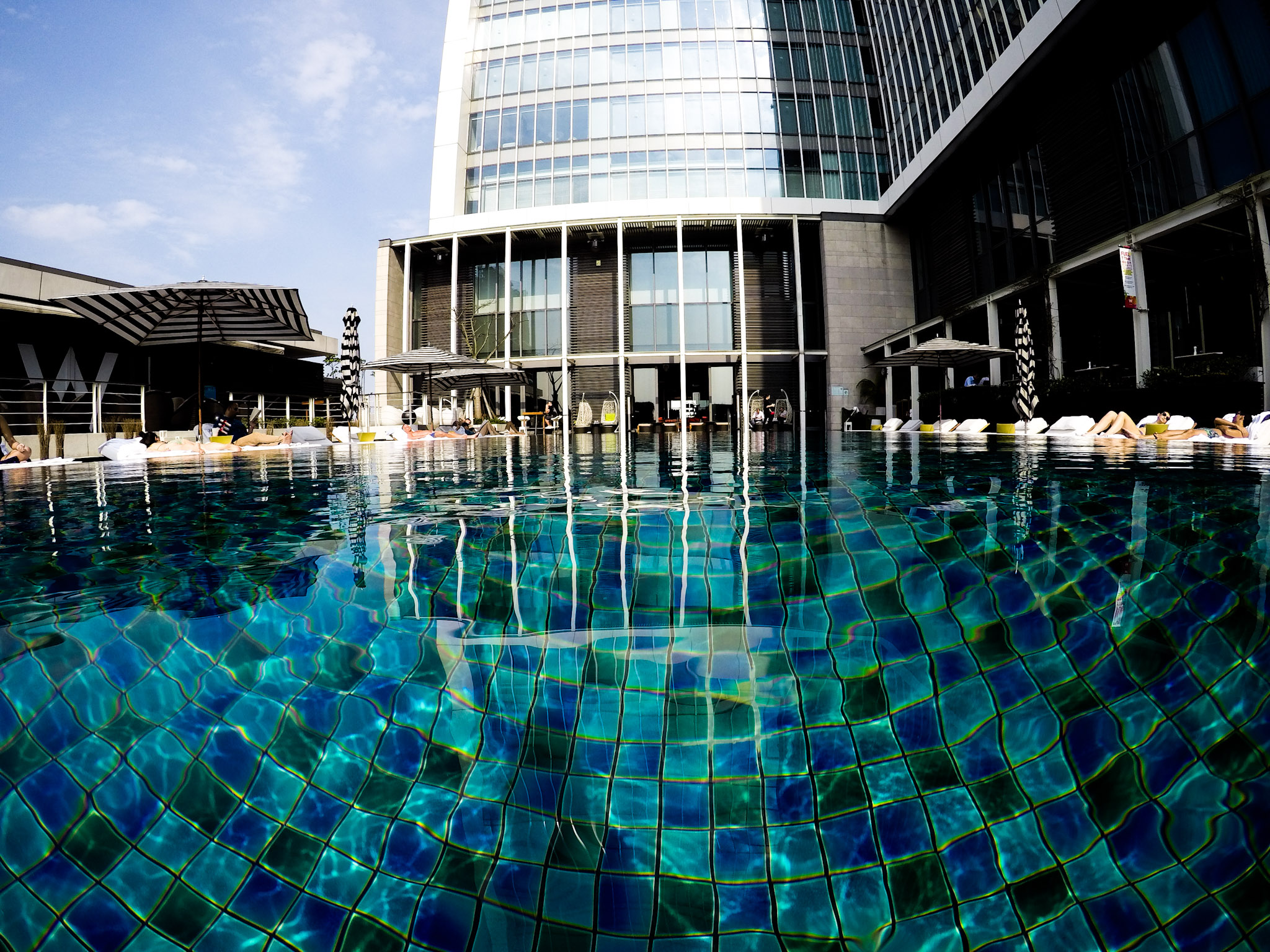
W Taipei WET Pool

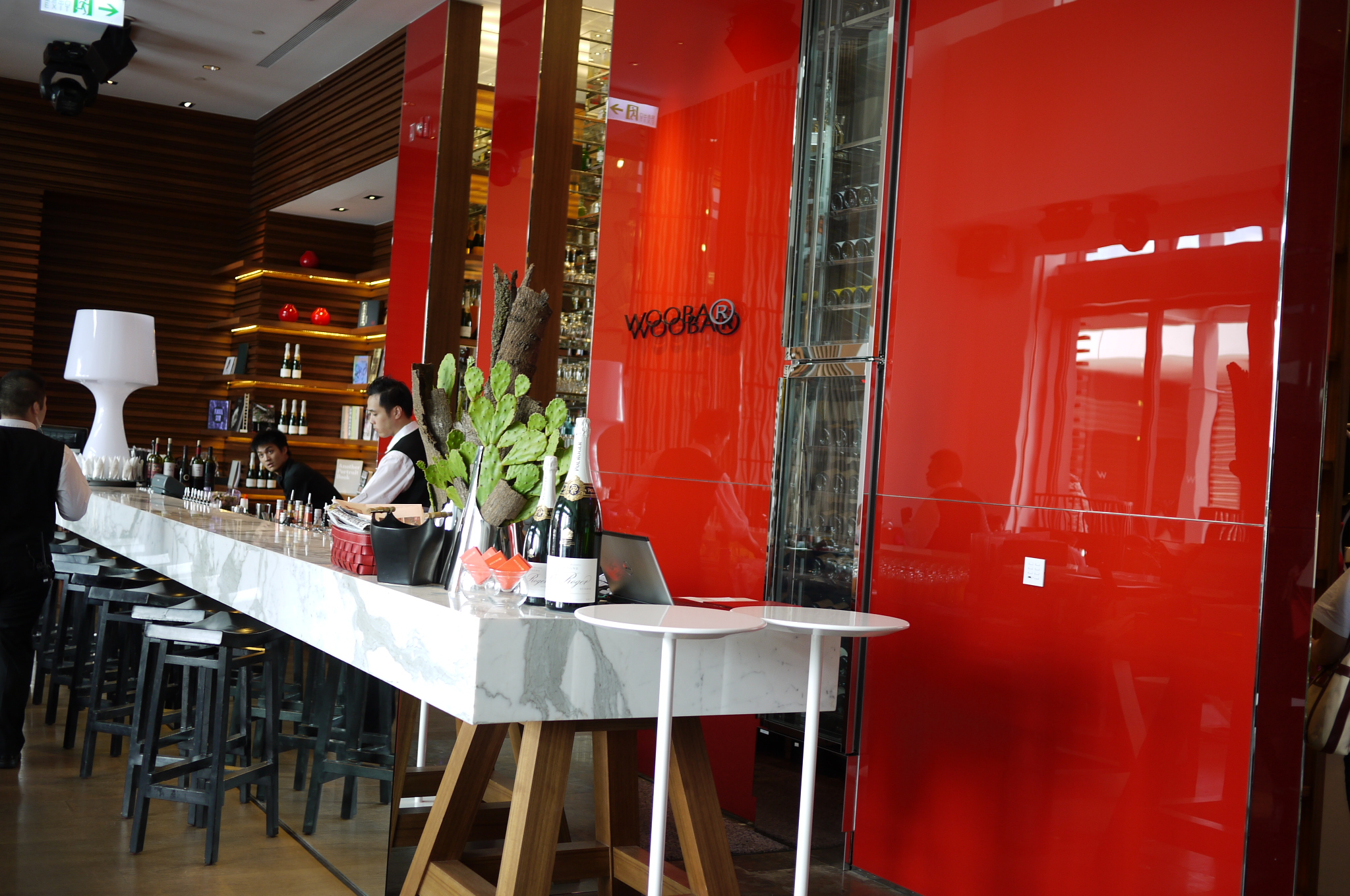
W Taipei WOOBAR

== See also ==
- W Hotels
- Marriott International
- Taipei City Hall Bus Station
- Uni-President Enterprises Corporation
