= Han-Lai New World Center =

Skyscraper located in Qianjin, Kaohsiung, Taiwan

- 漢來新世界中心
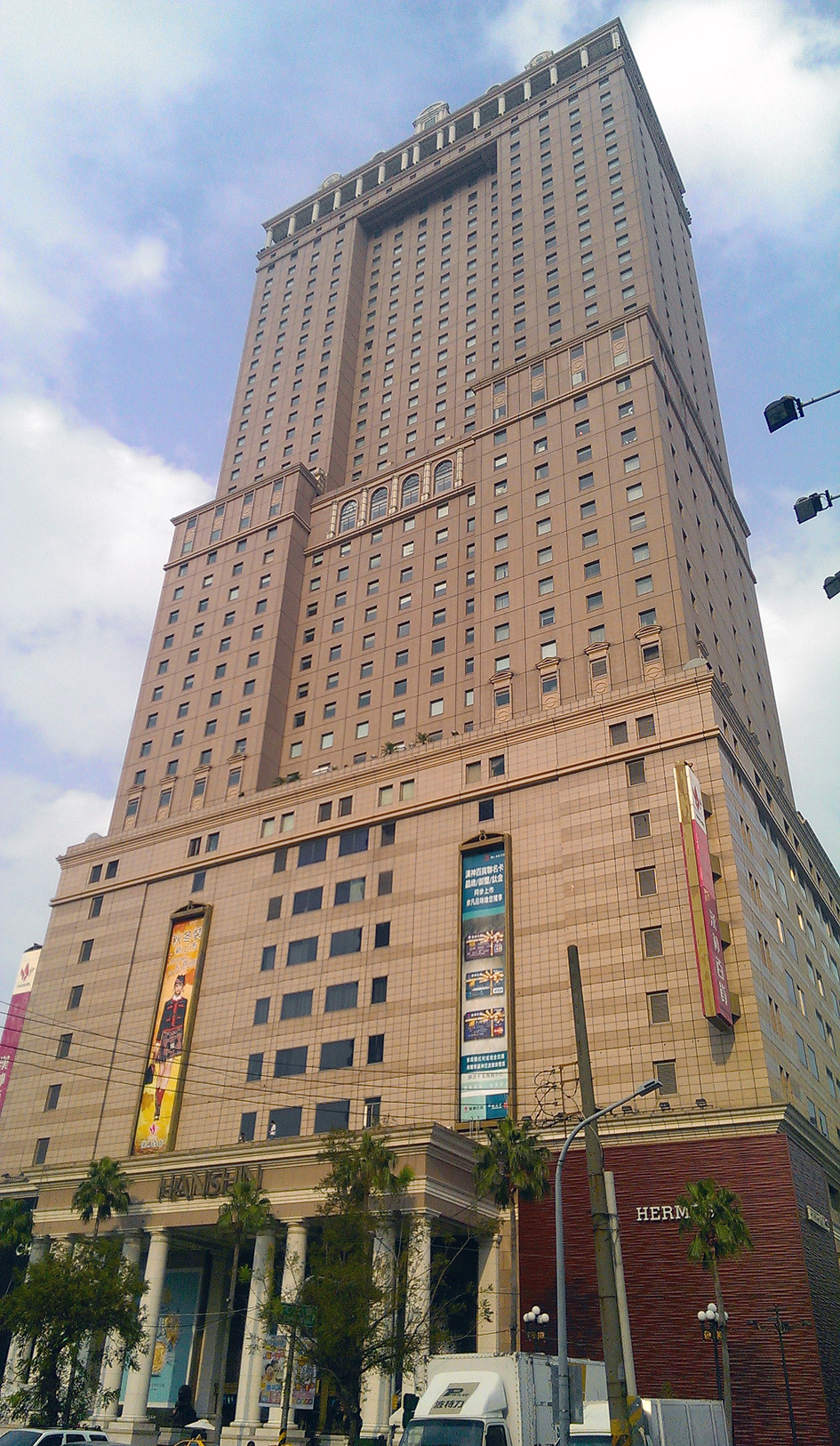
- Interactive map of the Han-Lai New World Center area

General information
- Status: Completed
- Architectural style: Neoclassicism
- Location: Cianjin, Kaohsiung, Taiwan
- Coordinates: 22°37′09.9″N 120°17′46.7″E
- Construction started: 15 August 1990
- Completed: 4 January 1995

Height
- Tip: 186 meters

Technical details
- Floor count: 42
- Floor area: 146,708.01 m^{2}

The Han-Lai New World Center (traditional Chinese: 漢來新世界中心; simplified Chinese: 汉来新世界中心; pinyin: Hànlái Xīn Shìjiè Zhōngxīn) is a skyscraper located in Cianjin District, Kaohsiung, Taiwan. It is the eleventh tallest building in Taiwan and the third tallest in Kaohsiung (after 85 Sky Tower and Chang-Gu World Trade Center). The height of the building is 186 m, the floor area is 146,708.01m^{2}, and it comprises 42 floors above ground, as well as 7 basement levels. Occupants include Hanshin Department Store and the Grand Hi-Lai Hotel.

== See also ==
- List of tallest buildings in Taiwan
