= Kaohsiung Grand Hotel =

Hotel in Niaosong, Kaohsiung, Taiwan

- 高雄澄清湖圓山大飯店
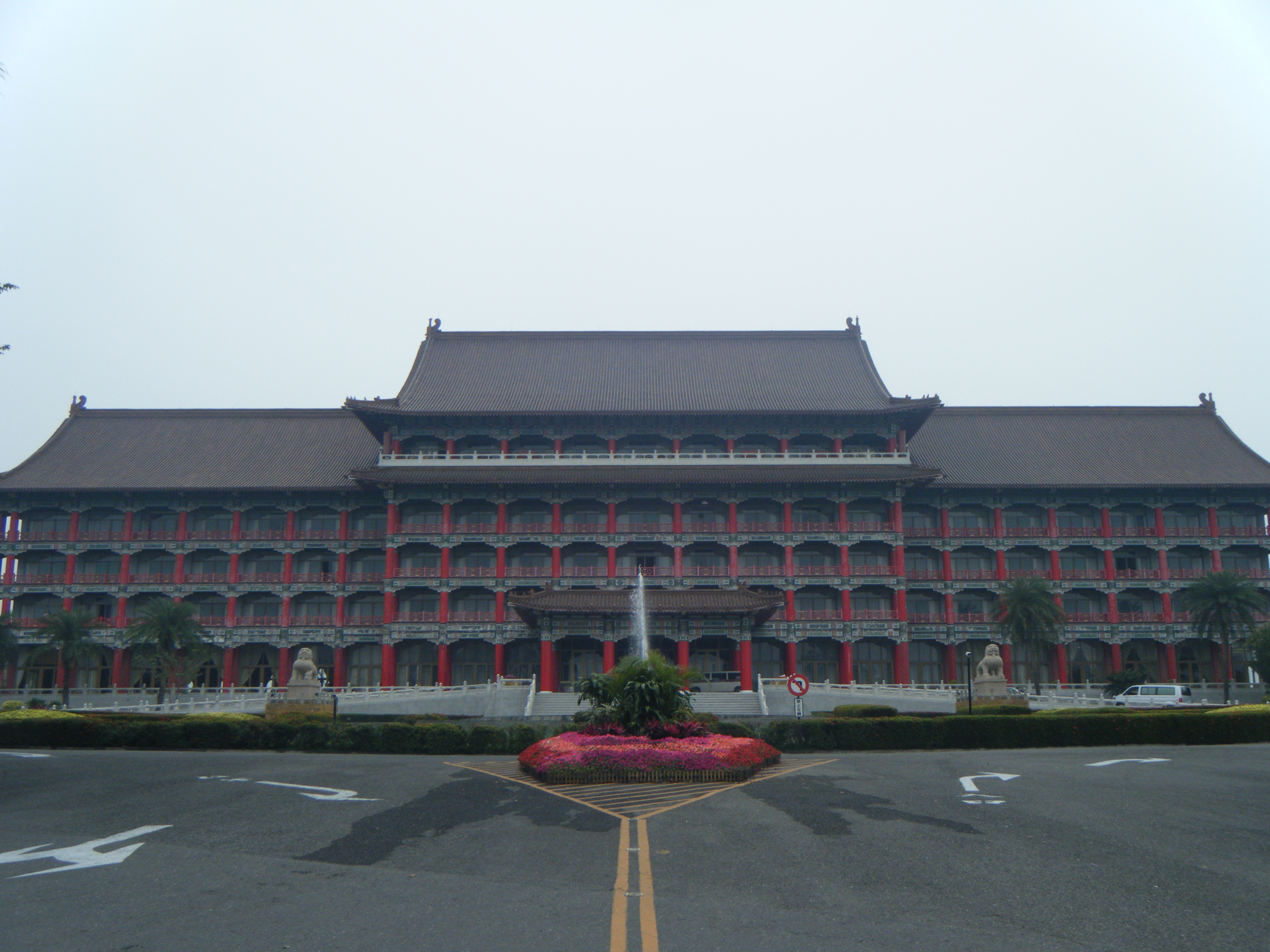
- Interactive map of the Kaohsiung Grand Hotel area

General information
- Type: hotel
- Architectural style: Western and classic Eastern
- Location: Niaosong, Kaohsiung, Taiwan
- Coordinates: 22°39′17.7″N 120°20′47.6″E
- Opened: 1957 (original building); 1971 (current building)

Website
- www.grand-hotel.org/kaohsiung

The Kaohsiung Grand Hotel (traditional Chinese: 高雄澄清湖圓山大飯店; simplified Chinese: 高雄澄清湖圆山大饭店; pinyin: Gāoxióng Chéngqīng Hú Yuánshān Dàfàndiàn) is a hotel located in Niaosong District, Kaohsiung, Taiwan. The hotel is located next to the Chengcing Lake. The Grand Hotel is a sister hotel of the main Grand Hotel in Taipei City, the Taipei Grand Hotel.

== History ==
The hotel was established in 1957 near Kaohsiung and in 1971 was moved to its present location.

== Architecture ==
The hotel was built with a combination of Western and classic Eastern architectural style.

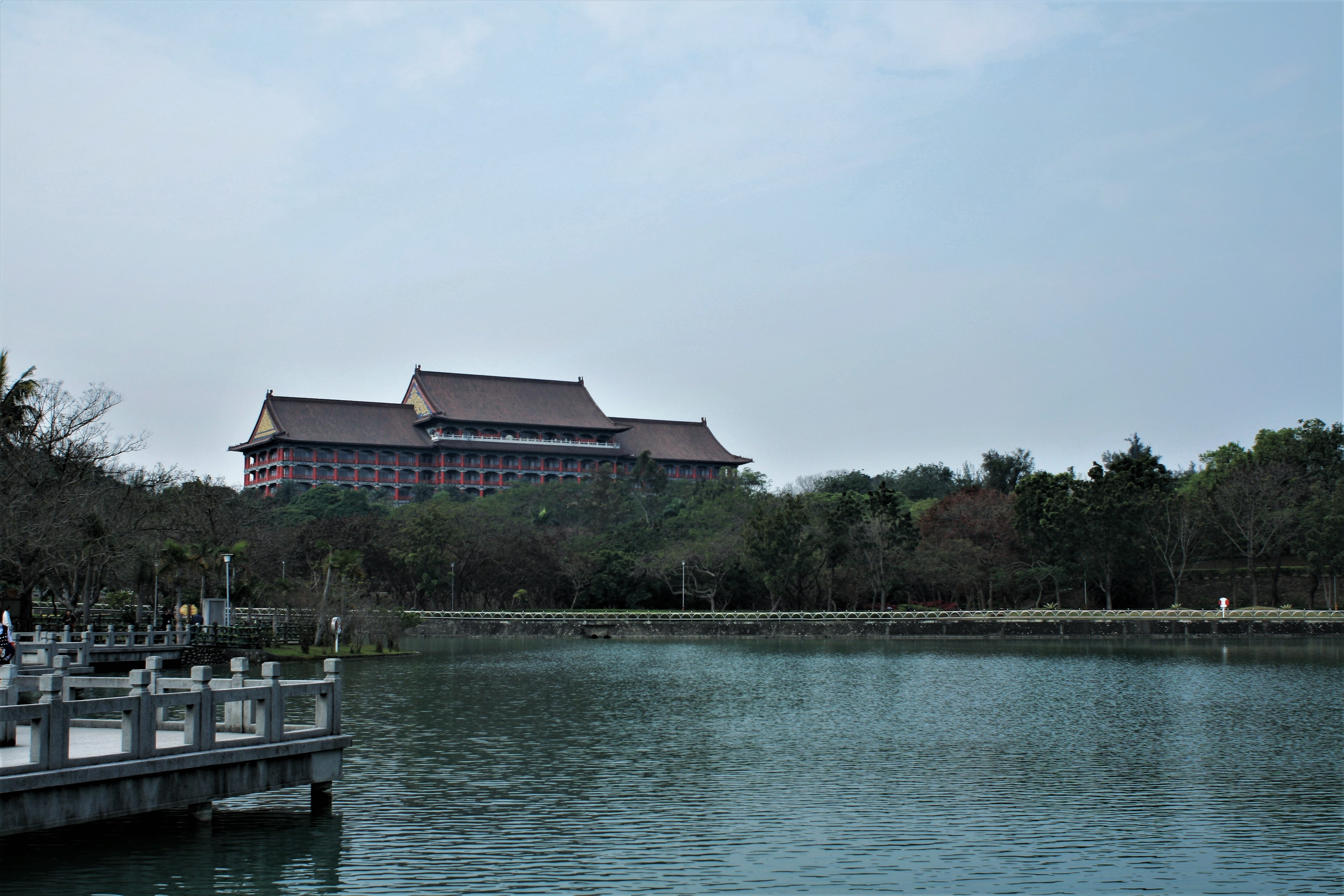
Grand Hotel Kaohsiung

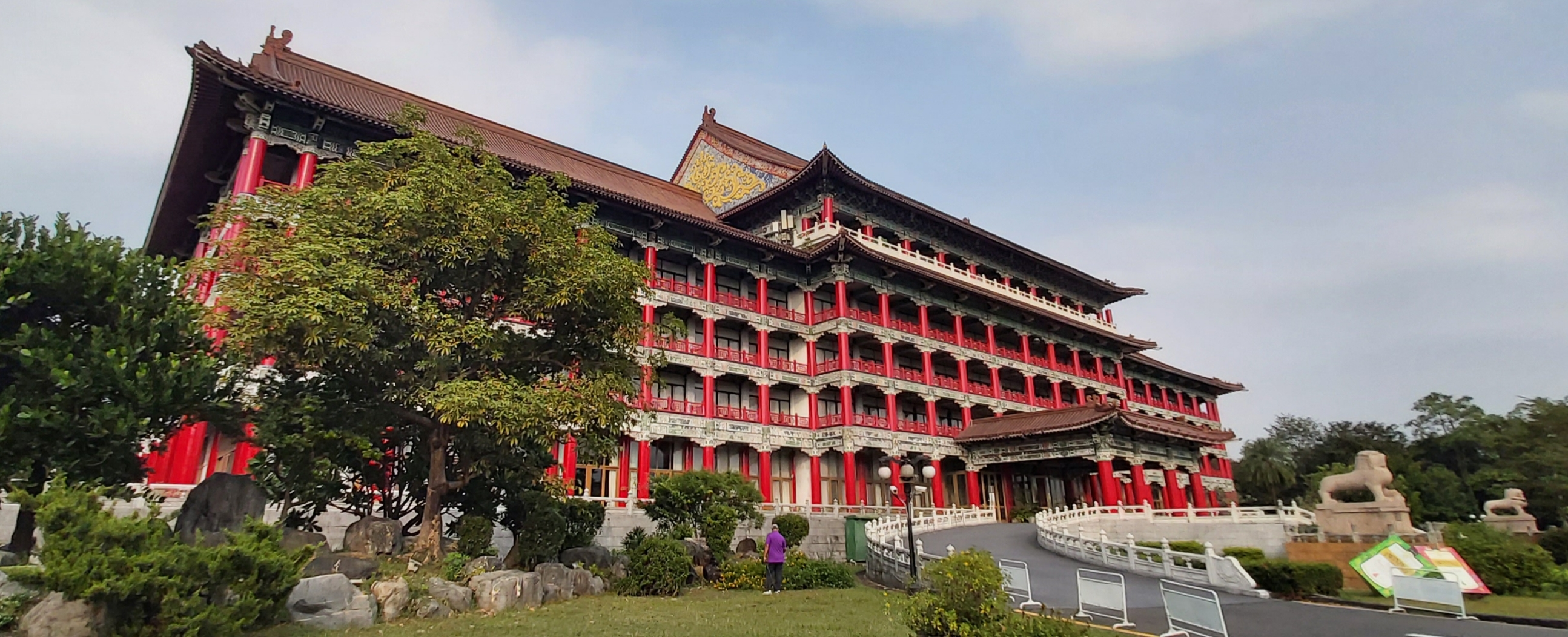
Grand Hotel Kaohsiung

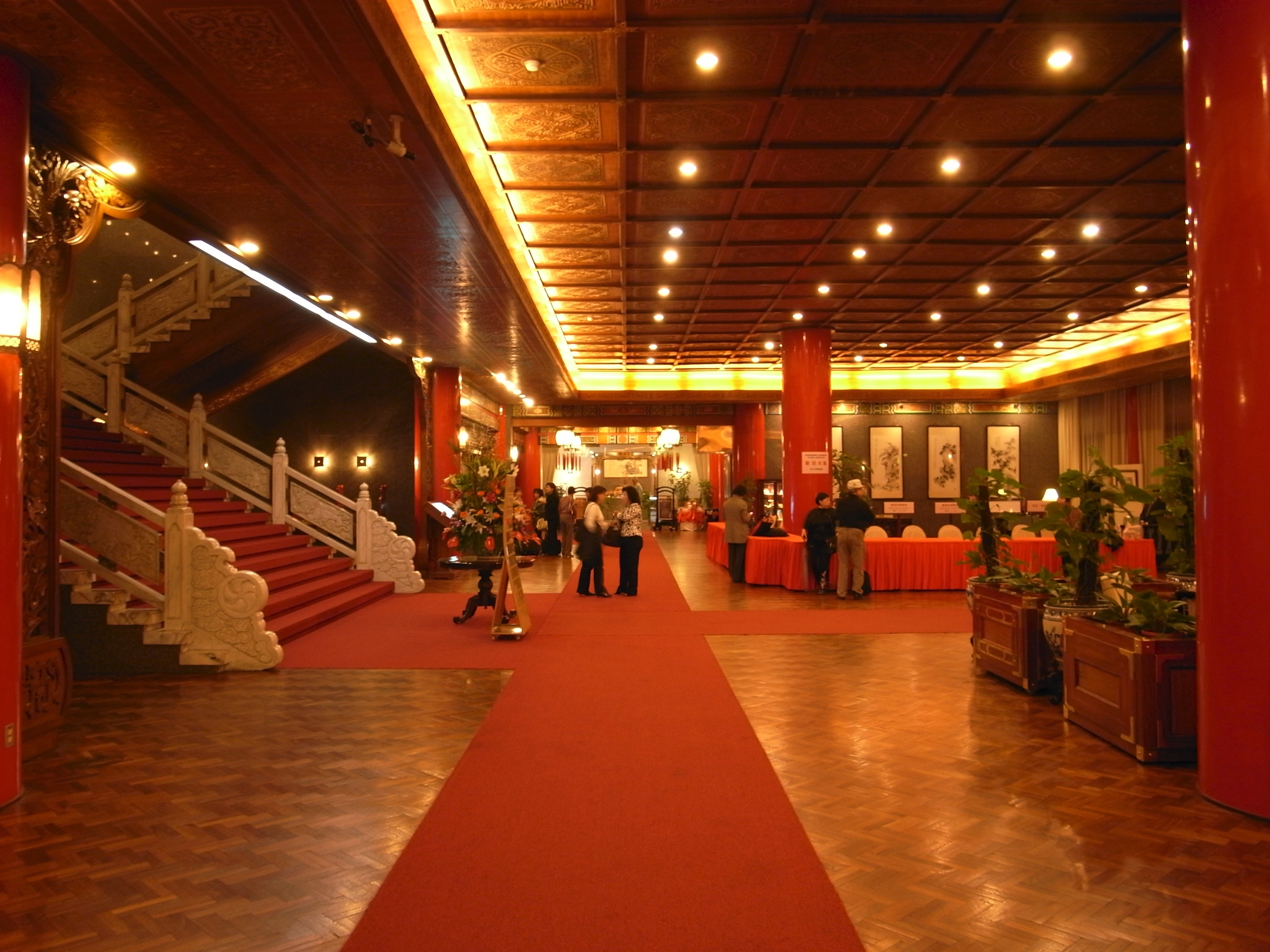
Lobby

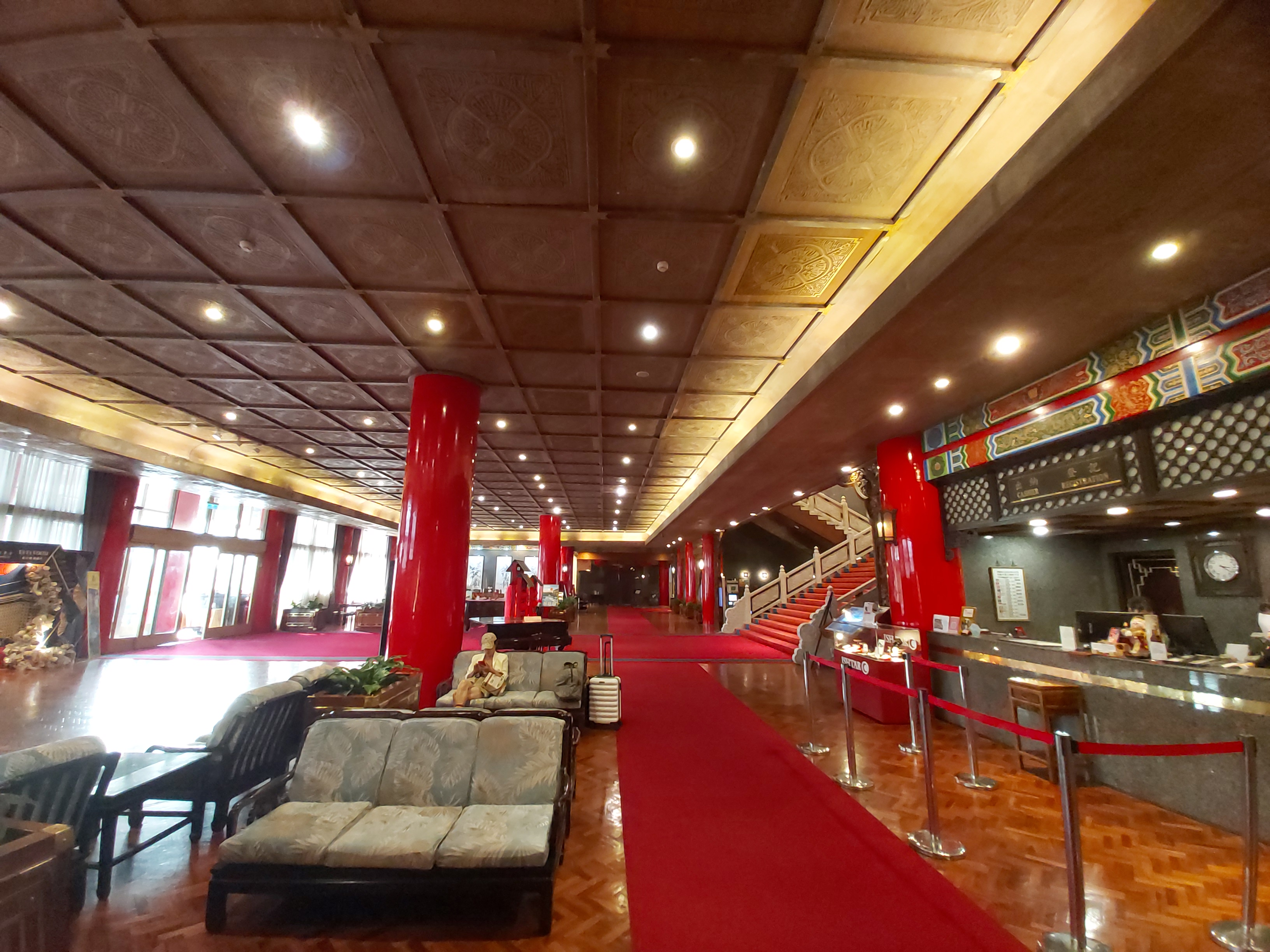
Reception and cashier window

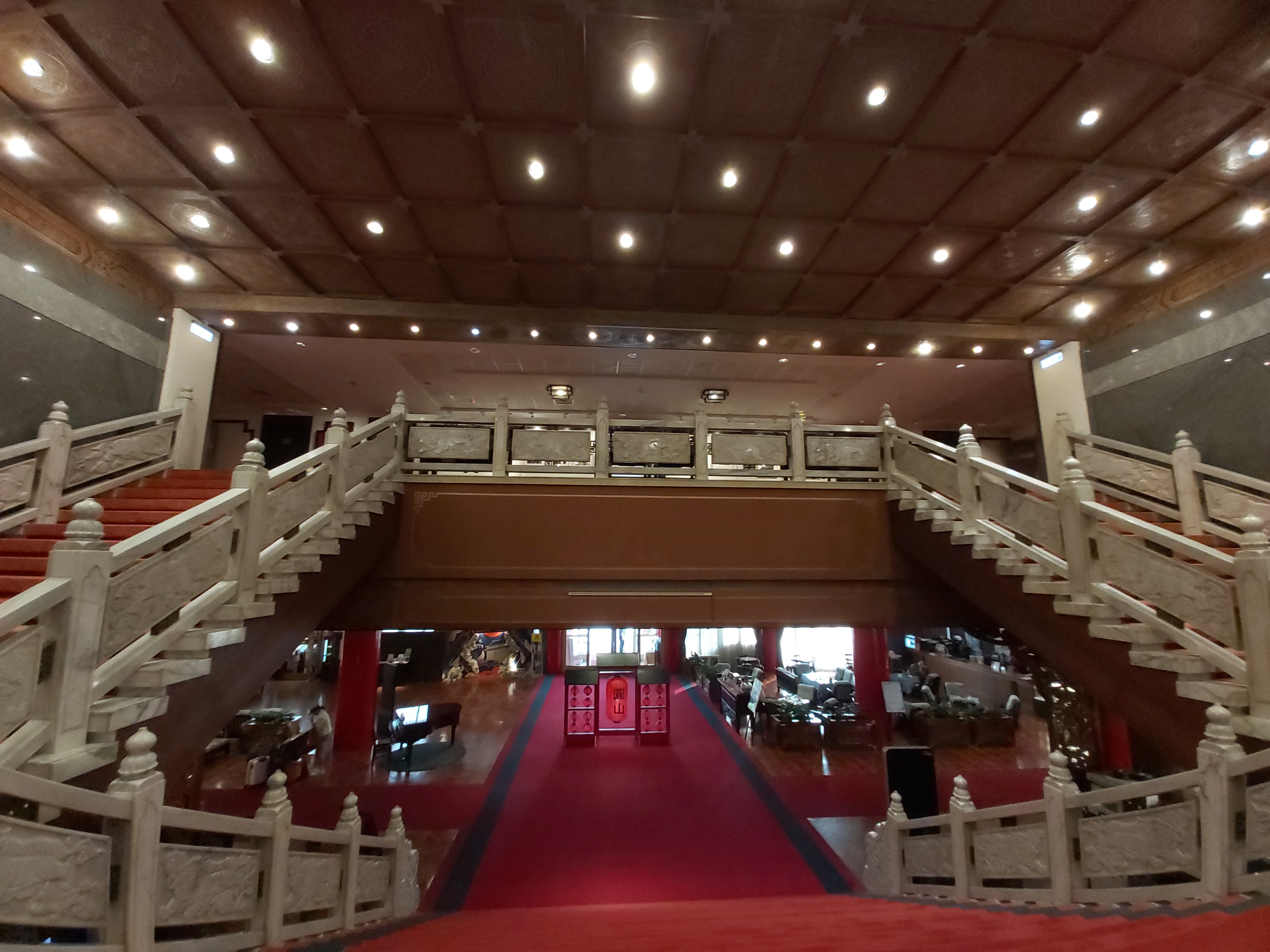
Stairs of the Hotel

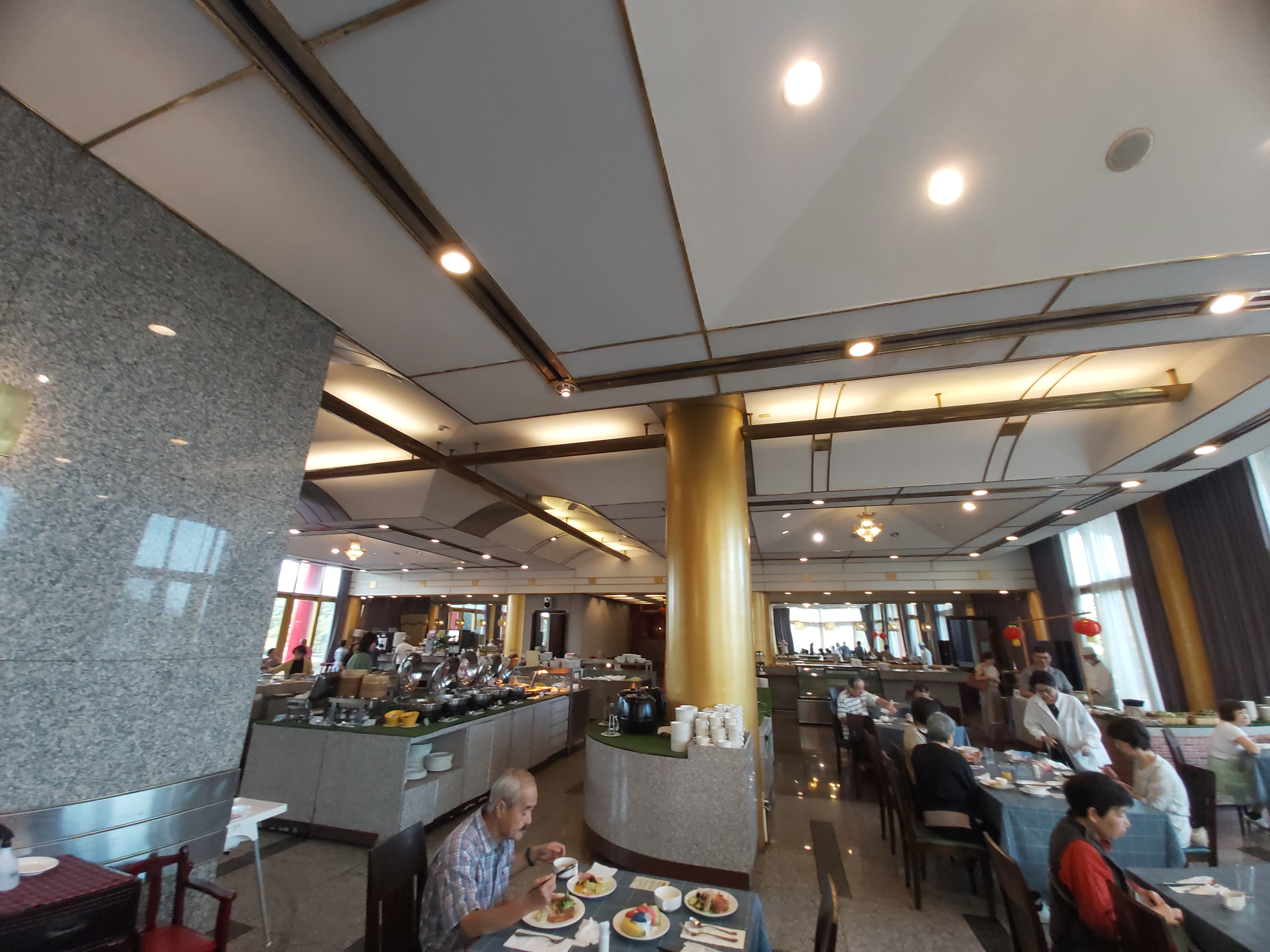
Western Restaurant

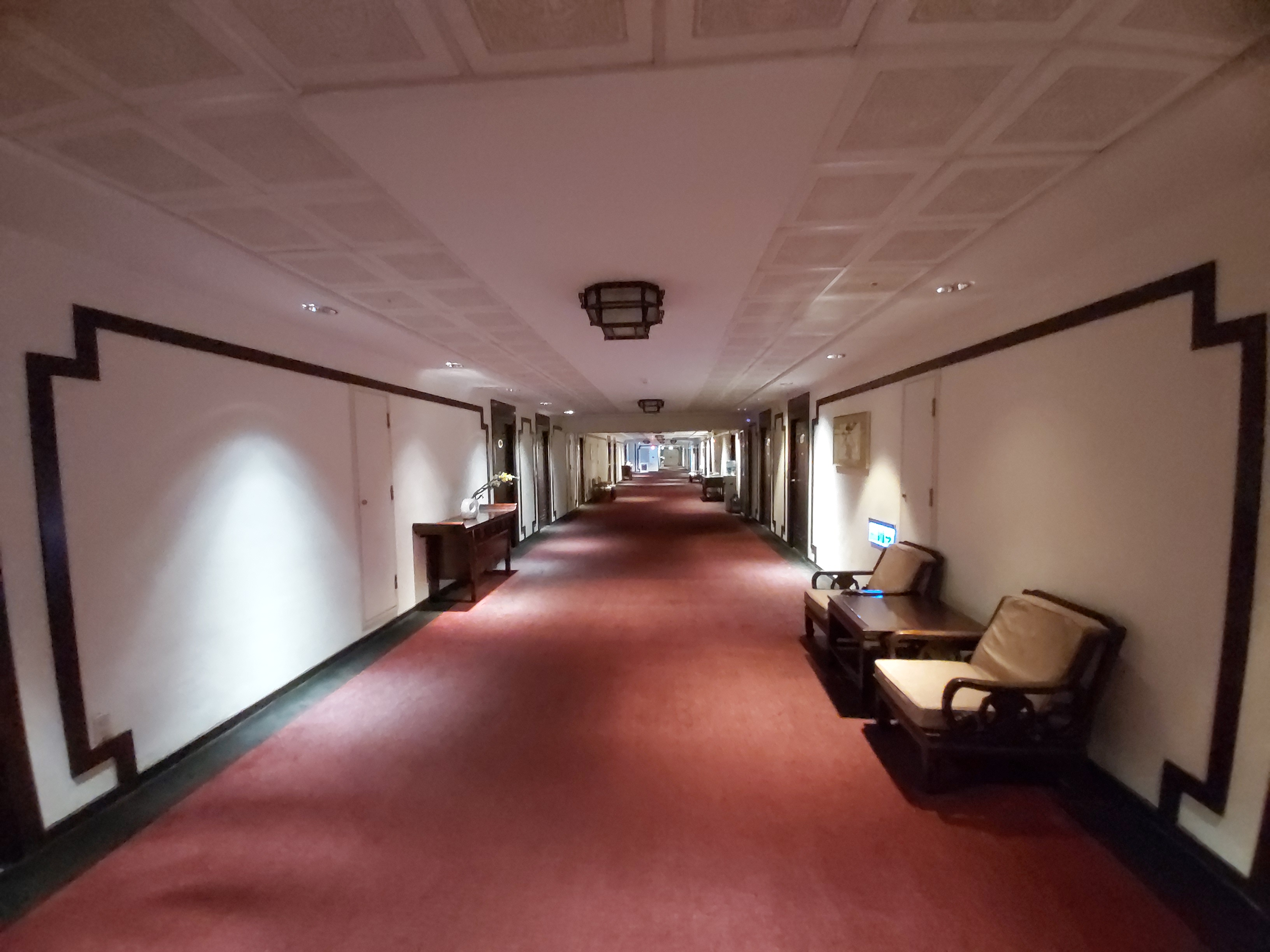
Corridor

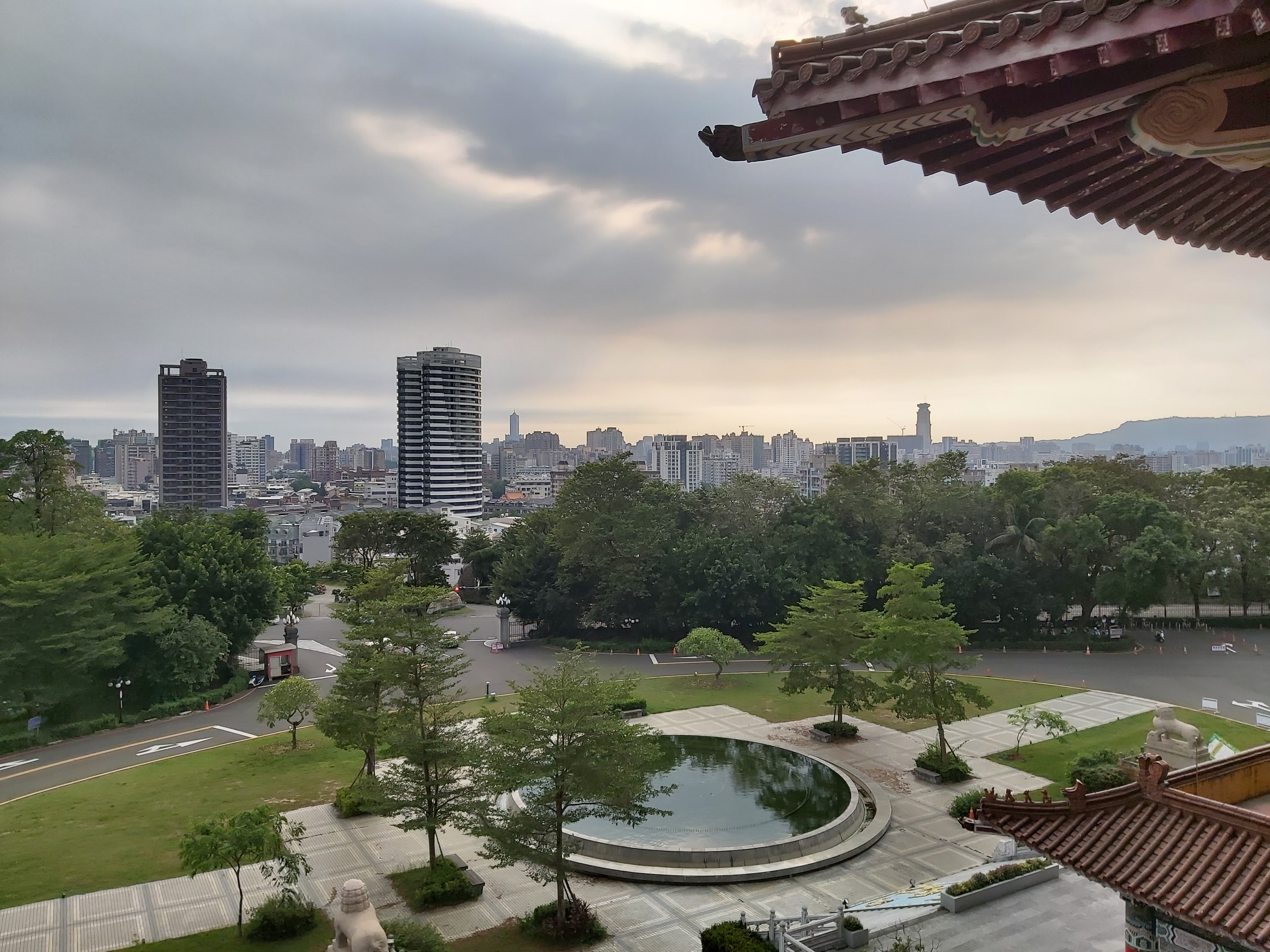
View from the front side

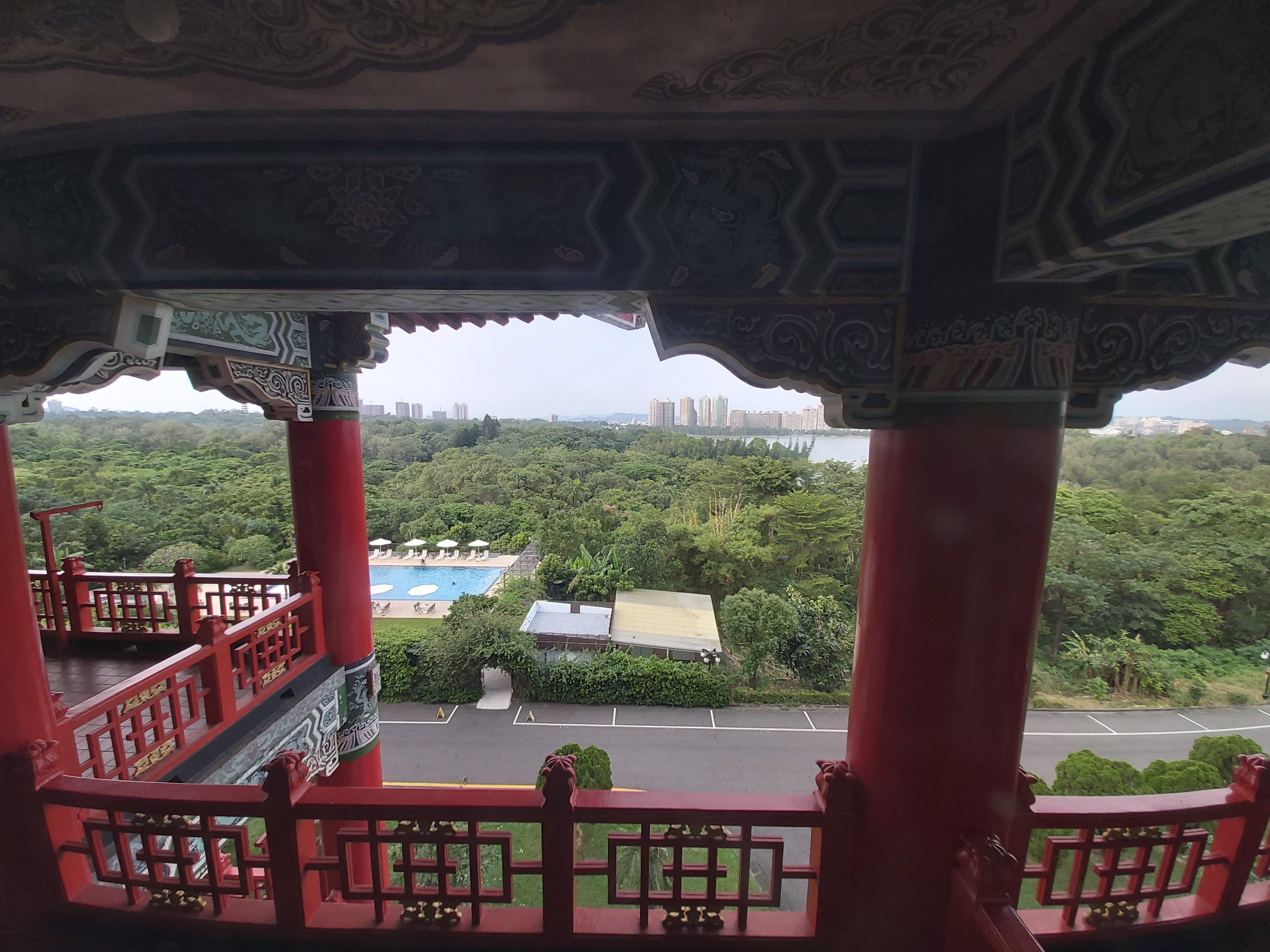
View from the back side

== See also ==
- Grand Hotel (Taipei)
