= List of hotels: Countries G =

This is a list of what are intended to be the notable top hotels by country, five or four star hotels, notable skyscraper landmarks or historic hotels which are covered in multiple reliable publications. It should not be a directory of every hotel in every country:

== Georgia ==
- Hotel Ambasadori, Tbilisi
- Hotel Intourist Palace, Batumi
- Radisson Blu Iveria Hotel, Tbilisi
- Sheraton Metechi Palace Hotel, Tbilisi
- Tbilisi Marriott Hotel, Tbilisi
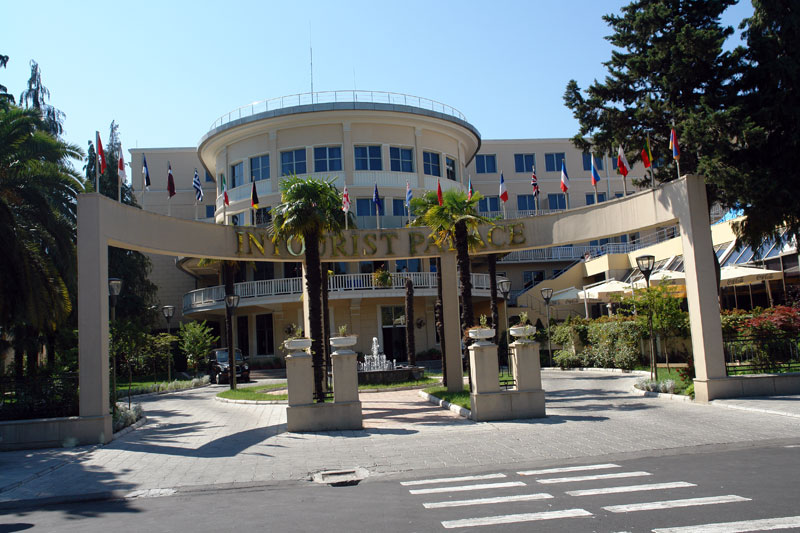
Hotel Intourist Palace

== Gibraltar ==
- Bristol Hotel
- Caleta Hotel
- The Rock Hotel

== Greece ==
- Grande Bretagne, Athens
- Hilton Athens, Athens
- Makedonia Palace, Thessaloniki
- Porto Carras, Sithonia
- President Hotel Athens, Athens
- Xenia
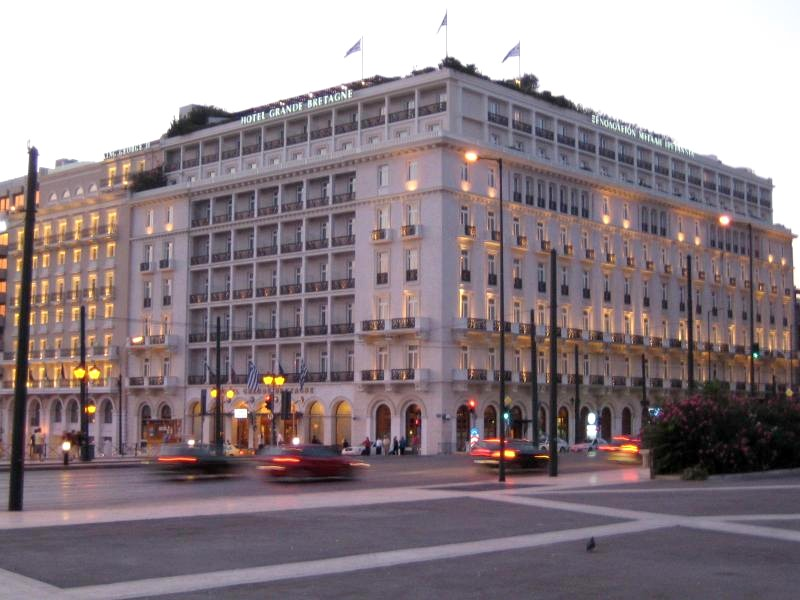
Grande Bretagne

Hilton Athens

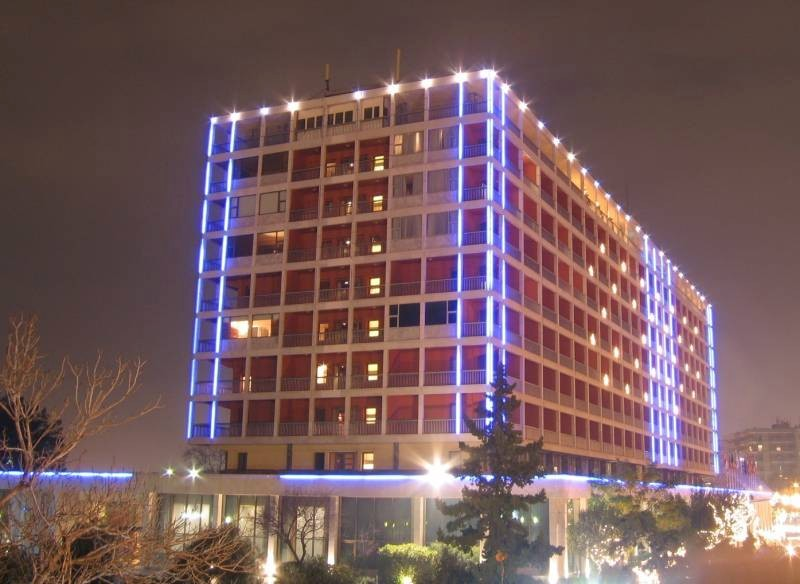
Makedonia Palace

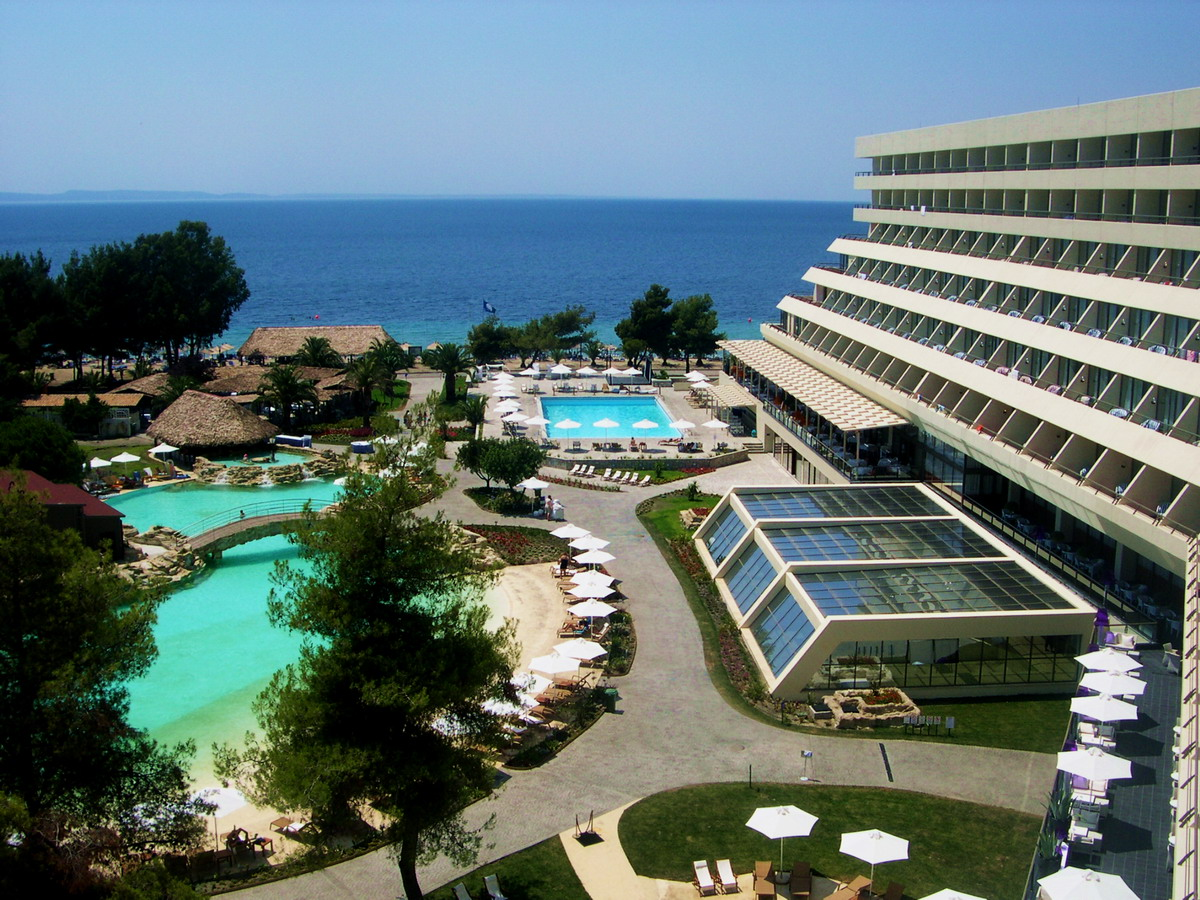
Porto Carras

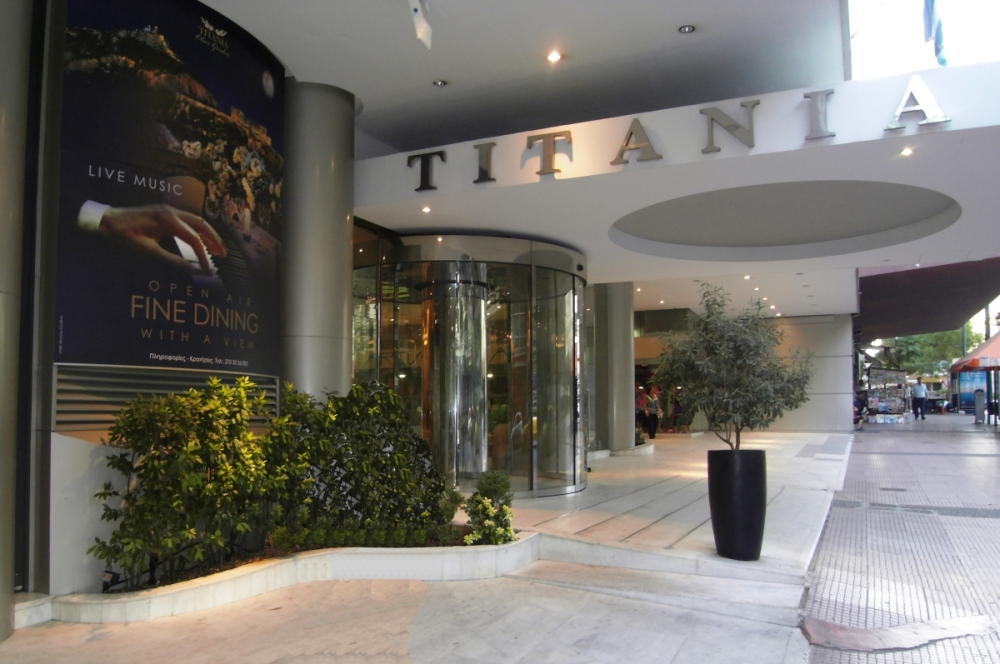
Titania

== Guam ==
- Hotel Nikko Guam, Tumon

== Guatemala ==
- Hotel Casa Santo Domingo, Antigua Guatemala
- Hotel Museo Uxlabil, Antigua Guatemala
- Porta Hotel Antigua, Antigua Guatemala
- Tikal Futura, Guatemala City
Tikal Futura

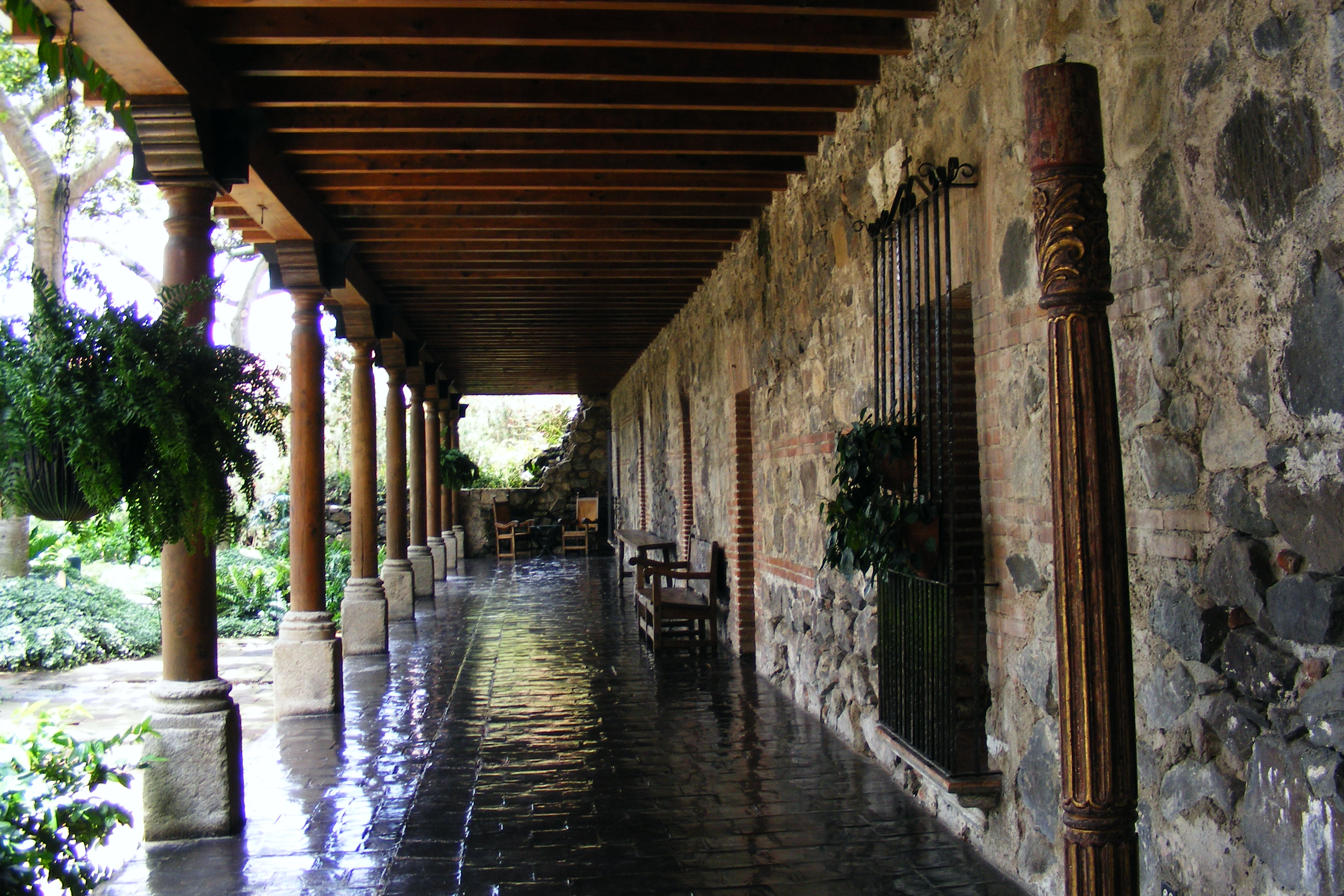
Hotel Casa Santo Domingo

== Guinea ==
- Hotel Camayene, Conakry
- Hotel de France, Conakry
- Le Meridien Mariador Palace, Conakry
- Novotel Ghi Conakry, Conakry
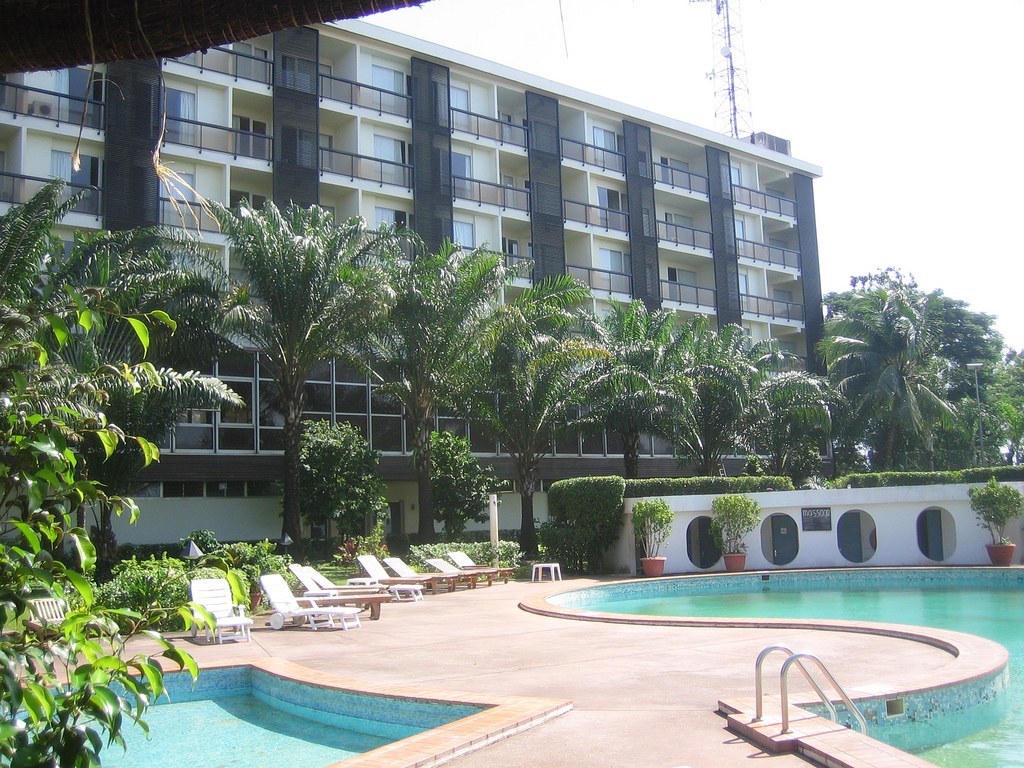
Hotel Camayenne

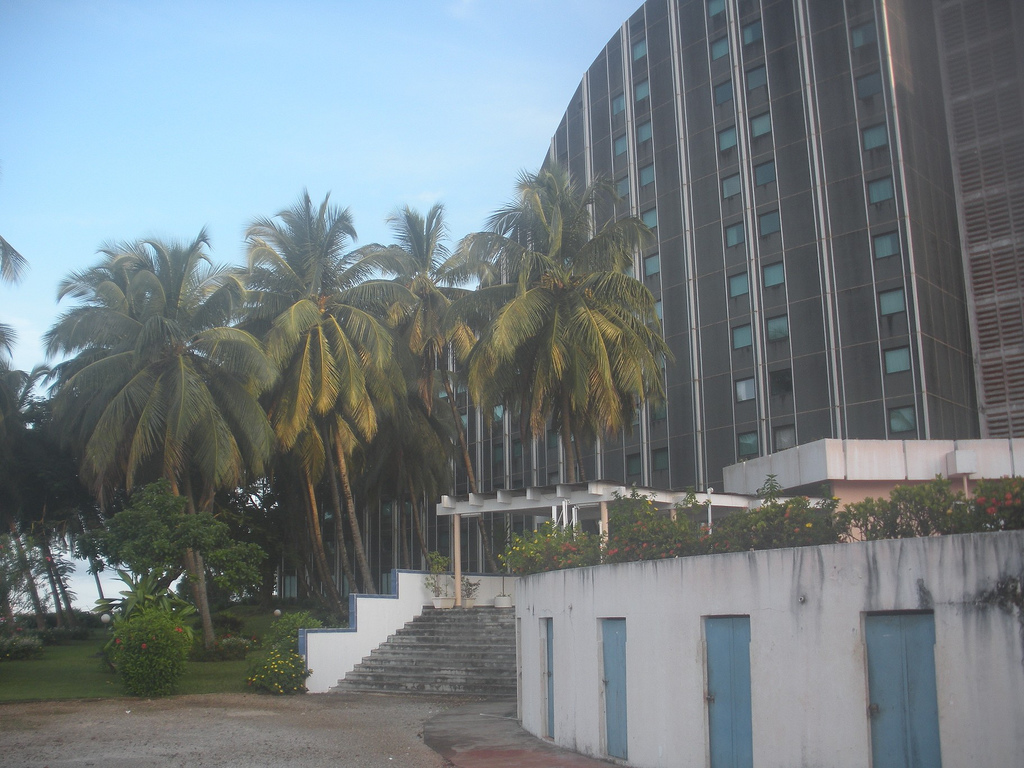
Novotel Conakry

== Guinea-Bissau ==
- Hotel Hotti Bissau, Bissau
