= Ambassador (disambiguation) =

Ambassador is the highest ranking diplomat who represents a nation.

Ambassador(s) or The Ambassador(s) or may also refer to:

== Representatives ==
- Brand ambassador
- Goodwill ambassador

== Arts and entertainment ==
=== Film, television and theatre ===
- The Ambassador (1936 film), an Italian historical comedy film
- The Ambassador (1960 film), a West German film
- The Ambassador (1984 American film), a political thriller based on Elmore Leonard's novel 52 Pick-Up
- The Ambassador (1984 Croatian film), a film directed by Fadil Hadžić
- The Ambassador (2005 film), a Norwegian documentary film directed by Erling Borgen
- The Ambassador (2011 film), a Danish documentary film
- The Raja Saab, working title Ambassador, a 2025 Indian romantic horror film by Maruthi
- Ambassador (musical), a 1971 adaptation of the Henry James novel (see below)
- The Ambassador (TV series), a 1998–1999 British drama
- Ambassadors (TV series), a 2013 British comedy drama television series

=== Literature and art ===
- The Ambassador, a 1991 novel by Ioan Mihai Cochinescu
- The Ambassador (comic strip), a comic strip by Otto Soglow
- The Ambassador (magazine) (formerly International Textiles), a British export magazine for textiles and fashion
- Ambassador (novel), a 2015 science fiction book by American writer William Alexander
- The Ambassador (West novel), a 1965 novel by Australian writer Morris West
- The Ambassadors (Holbein), a 1533 painting by Hans Holbein the Younger
- The Ambassadors (novel), a 1903 novel by American-British writer Henry James
- The Ambassadors (comics), a comic book series and characters by Mark Millar
- The Ambassador (trade journal), British publication from 1945 to 1972

=== Music ===
- Ambassador (album), a 2005 album by Elliott Brood
- The Ambassador (rapper), Christian rapper
- DJ Misjah (born 1971), Dutch DJ who also performs under the name "AMbassador"
- The Saints (British band) or The Ambassadors, an English pop group
- X Ambassadors, an American rock band

== Places ==
- The Ambassador (Indianapolis, Indiana), a historic apartment building
- Ambassador Auditorium, Pasadena, California
- Ambassador Bridge, between Detroit, Michigan and Windsor, Ontario
- Ambassador College (defunct), Pasadena, California
- Ambassador Hotel (disambiguation), several hotels
- Ambassador Theatre (disambiguation), several theatres

== Transport ==
=== Motor vehicles ===
- Ambassador (automobile company), an automobile company of Chicago, Illinois
- AMC Ambassador, the top-of-the-line models produced by American Motors Corporation (AMC) from 1958 until 1974
- Austin Ambassador, a hatchback car model marketed by British Leyland from 1982 to 1984
- Hindustan Ambassador, a car manufactured by Hindustan Motors of India from 1958 until 2014
- Nash Ambassador, the model name applied to the senior line of Nash automobiles from 1932 until 1957
- Yellow Cab Ambassador, vehicles sold for use as taxis from 1921 until 1925

=== Trains ===
- Ambassador (B&M train), operated by the Boston & Maine Railroad between New York/Boston and Montreal
- Ambassador (B&O train), operated by the Baltimore & Ohio Railroad between Baltimore and Detroit

=== Other uses in transport ===
- Ambassador (clipper), a 1869 British tea clipper, one of the last composite ships
- Ambassador (motorcycles), made by a British manufacturer
- Airspeed Ambassador, a British airliner
- Berkhof Ambassador, a Dutch bus from the company Berkhof
- HMS Ambassador, a Second World War minesweeper

== Other uses ==
- Ambassadors F.C., a football club in Northern Ireland
- The Ambassador, winner of the 1942 Hambletonian Stakes
- Ambassador Cruise Line, a UK based provider of cruise ship holidays
- BT Ambassador, a telephone switchboard PBX

== See also ==
- Ambassadeur, a Swedish fishing reel
- Les Ambassadeurs (disambiguation)
- People to People Student Ambassador Program, a former travel service in Spokane, U.S.
- Student ambassador
- X Ambassadors, an American alternative rock band
