= Ambassador Apartments =

Ambassador Apartments may refer to:

- Ambassador Apartments (Hartford, Connecticut)
- Ambassador Apartments (Springfield, Missouri)
- President and Ambassador Apartments, Lincoln, Nebraska
- Ambassador Apartments (Portland, Oregon)

== See also ==
- Ambassador Hotel (disambiguation)
