= Ambassador Hotel =

Ambassador Hotel may refer to:

== United States ==
- Ambassador Hotel (Los Angeles), California
- Ambassador Hotel (Jacksonville), Florida
- Ambassador Hotel (San Francisco), California
- Ambassador Hotel (Atlantic City), New Jersey (converted to the Tropicana Casino and Resort in 1981)
- Ambassador Hotel (Tulsa, Oklahoma)
- Ambassador East, Chicago, Illinois
- Ambassador West, Chicago, Illinois
- Ambassador Hotel Historic District, listed on the National Register of Historic Places for Kansas City, Missouri
- Hotel Ambassador, 345 Park Avenue, Manhattan, New York (1921-1958)

== Other places ==
- Ambasador Hotel, Niš, Serbia
- Ambassador Hotel Hsinchu, Taiwan
- Ambassador Hotel Kaohsiung, Taiwan

== See also ==
- Hotel Ambasadori, Tbilisi, Georgia
- Disney Ambassador Hotel, Tokyo Disney Resort, Japan
