= Timeline of Batumi =

History of the city of Batumi, Georgia

The following is a timeline of the history of the city of Batumi, Georgia.

== Prior to 20th century ==
- 1873 – Batumi is the main city of Lazistan sanjak.
- 1870s – The construction of the sea port was finished and the expansion of Batumi began.
- 1877–1878 – During the Russo-Turkish War Batumi was defended by a 25,000 Ottoman army under Dervish-Pasha as well as the Ottoman warships cruising off the Black Sea coastline.
- 1878
  - March 3; The Ottomans ceded Batumi to the Russian Empire.
  - August: Population: 2,000.
  - August 25: under the guidance of General Pyotr Dmitrievich Sviatopolk-Mirsky Russian army entered Batumi and at the ceremony of reception – accompany on so called "Azizie square" accepted city key from Devrish Pasha.
  - Following the Treaty of Berlin Batumi was declared a free port (porto franco) and maintained this status until 1886.
- Under the Russian oppression of Islam, thousands of Muslim Georgians and Laz people fled to the Ottoman Empire.
- 1881 – The famous Prussian gardener and landscape architect Ressler initially began the construction of Batumi Boulevard.
- 1882 – Population: 8,671.
- 1883
  - June 12; on the base of the decision of Russian Emperor’s State Council Batumi region was canceled and joined to Kutais Governorate.
  - Ressler passed away and Michael D'alfons, a French architect replaced him.
  - Completed construction of Baku-Batumi railway system.
- 1884 – Completed construction of Batumi Boulevard.
- 1886
  - "Porto-Franco" was abolished.
  - Batumi Mosque was commissioned by the family of Aslan Beg Khimshiashvili, a Muslim Georgian nobleman.
- 1888
  - April 28: Batum was officially granted the city status and the right to elect the city council.
  - September 2: The first election was held. Gavronsky elected the first mayor of Batum.
- 1889 – Population: 12,000.
- 1892
  - June 22; the "Markus", a huge tanker ship departed Batumi for Bangkok, Thailand, becoming the first oil tanker to transit the Suez Canal.
- 1895
  - January 25: Prince Luka Asatiani, former mayor of Kutaisi, was elected a mayor of Batum.
  - boys' gymnasium was built.
- 1897
  - Reconstruction of the Batumi port.
  - Population: 28,508

== 20th century ==
- 1900s, Batumi became a focus of Social Democratic agitation.
- 1901 – Stalin arrived in Batumi, setting up base in Ali, the Persian tavern.
- 1902
  - Batumi City Hall was constructed.
  - Population: 16,000, with 1,000 of them oil refinery workers.
  - January 1: Stalin made a speech to 30 party members shouting "We mustn't fear death! The sun is rising. Let's sacrifice our lives!"
  - January 4: Stalin set the refinery on fire, the workers put it out meaning they are due a bonus which is refused. Stalin got a printing press from Tiflis and called a strike.
  - February 17: the strikers win a 30% pay increase.
  - February 26: 389 radical workers are sacked. Stalin calls a second strike.
  - March: mass strike at the Rothschild oil refinery.
    - March 7: strike leaders arrested.
    - March 8: Stalin leads demonstrations outside the police station demanding their release. The prisoners are moved to a transit prison. Governor general Smagin agrees to meet the demonstrators.
    - March 10: A mob tries to storm the prison but a renegade tips off the Cossacks and troops who fire on them though some prisoners escape. The events culminated in rioting in which the future Soviet leader Joseph Stalin played a role. The clashes with police left 15 dead, 54 wounded, and 500 in prison.
    - March 12: the dead workers are buried triggering a 7,000 strong demonstration surrounded by Cossacks and gendarmes who ban songs and speeches.
- 1903 – Batumi oblast was separated from Kutais Governorate.
- 1904 – The Batumi Synagogue was built,
- 1906
  - Construction of the Baku-Batumi pipeline completed.
  - Batumi became an important sea terminal along the Black Sea littoral.
- 1910 – the Russian authorities decided to dismantle the Mikhailovsky naval fortress at Batumi.
- 1912–1913 – a gunboat was stationed permanently to keep a check on arms smuggling.
- 1914 – Although the project to dismantle the Batum fortifications had not been completed by the beginning of World War I.
  - 7 and 10 December: the port still remained vulnerable to the powerful Ottoman-German vessels SMS Breslau and Goeben, which shelled Batum, without much effect.
- 1915: the Batumi Naval Detachment was established to support the Russian ground operations against Trabzon.
- 1917: after the February revolution, Evgeny Krinitsky, was nominated as a commissar of Batumi district, who was keeping the stability during this period.
- 1918
  - 12 February: Ottoman Empire briefly occupied Batumi.
  - 3 March: Soviet Russia granted the Muslim population of Batumi, Kars and Ardahan the right of self-determination under the Ottoman suzerainty.
  - 14 March-5 April: The Transcaucasian delegation attempted to reverse the clause on the Trabzon conference, but failed to achieve any results.
  - 14 April: the Ottoman army annexed Batum.
  - 4 June: Treaty of Batum
- 1919
  - January 12; the British expeditionary forces landed at Batumi to replace the Turkish troops and appointed General James Cooke-Collis as the governor of Batumi. Britain also created the Batumi council under the presidency of the Russian cadet Prilidian Maslov.
  - 14 April 1919: the governor disbanded the council and left the city.
  - The Committee of the Liberation of Muslim Georgia, led by Memed Abashidze and Haidar Abashidze, had repeatedly spoken of the establishment of autonomy on religious principles within the borders of Georgia.
  - August 15; the withdrawal of British Troops began from the Caucasus.
  - September 13; a prototype parliament, the Mejlis, was convened in Batum.
- 1920:
  - July; Britain ceded the entire region to Democratic Republic of Georgia.
- 1921
  - March 11: Following the Soviet invasion of Georgia Turkish forces occupied Batumi.
  - March 16: Turkish authorities proclaimed the annexation of Batumi
  - March 18: the city was recovered by Georgian troops under General Giorgi Mazniashvili, who then ceded its control to the arriving Soviets.
  - March 19: The Soviet rule in Batumi was declared.
  - July 16: the Soviet Union established the Adjarian Autonomous Soviet Socialist Republic.
- 1923 – Shota Rustaveli State University was founded.
- 1924
  - August 31: the local cell of the anti-Soviet underground organization was destroyed; its leaders, including major general Giorgi Purtseladze (then the chief of staff of the Batum fortifications), were shot.
- 1926 – Population: 48,474
- 1929 – Batumi Maritime Technical University was inaugurated.
- 1930
  - March 9: the new membership of the city council presidium were elected, whose chairman became Joseph Giorgadze.
- 1935 – Tsentral Stadium was constructed.
- During World War II, the city sent 12,258 soldiers in the Soviet army, and 4,728 never returned home.
- 1940 – Hotel Intourist Palace was constructed.
- 1944
  - March 5: the self-defense committee of the Soviet Union created the Batumi Maritime Institute.
- 1959 – Population: 82,328
- 1975 – Cafe Fantasy was built.
- 1989
  - Aslan Abashidze was appointed head of Adjara's governing council.
- 1990 – the construction of oil pipeline Baku-Batumi was completed.
- 1992 – Batumi State Maritime Academy was created.

== 21st century ==
- 2002 – Population: 121,806
- 2003
  - November 23; immediately after Shevardnadze's fall, Aslan Abashidze declared a state of emergency in the region.
- 2004
  - January 4; Adjara took part in the Georgian presidential elections won by Mikheil Saakashvili.
  - May, Abashidze claimed that Georgian forces were preparing to invade.
  - May 4; The local oppositional demonstrations.
  - May 6, Abashidze's position became untenable when local protesters took control over the central Batumi and Georgian Special Forces entered the region and started to disarm pro-Abashidze groups.
  - Abashidze resigned and departed the country for Moscow.
  - May 7; direct presidential rule was imposed in Adjara and 20-member Interim Council was set up to run the Autonomous Republic before the local elections could be held in the region.
  - July 20; Adjarian Supreme Council approved Levan Varshalomidze as the Chairman of the Autonomous Republic's Government.
- 2005 – March: Russia agreed to remove 12th Military Base.
- 2006
  - September 12: the local self governmental election of the representative unit was held.
- 2007
  - 26 May: Batumi International Airport begins operating.
  - 5 July: The Constitutional Court of Georgia was moved from Tbilisi to Batumi.
- 2010 – May 17: opening ceremony of the hotel "Sheraton Batumi"
- 2011 – opening ceremony of the hotel “Radisson Blu”
- 2013 – TAM GEO LLC announced it was investing $70 million to start construction of the 170-meter, 45-story mix-use complex Babillon Tower, which will be the tallest residential building in Georgia.
- 2014 – Population: 152,839.
