= Ambassador automobile =

Ambassador automobile may refer to several automobiles:

- AMC Ambassador
- Austin Ambassador
- Hindustan Ambassador
- Nash Ambassador
- Yellow Cab Ambassador
