= Les Ambassadeurs =

Les Ambassadeurs or Ambassadeurs may refer to:

- Les Ambassadeurs (film), a 1977 French-Tunisian film
- Ambassadeurs, an 1892 lithograph poster by Henri de Toulouse-Lautrec
- Café des Ambassadeurs, a café-concert in Paris also known as Les Ambassadeurs (1857–1929)
- Les Ambassadeurs (restaurant), a Parisian restaurant
- Les Ambassadeurs Club, a London casino
- Les Ambassadeurs, a Malian musical group
- Les Ambassadeurs (ensemble), period instrument orchestra founded by Alexis Kossenko

== See also ==
- Ambassadeur, a Swedish fishing reel
- Ambassador (disambiguation)
