= Monasterio de Santo Domingo, Antigua Guatemala =

Former monastery in Antigua Guatemala, Guatemala

Convent and Church of the Order of Preachers
- Iglesia y convento de Santo Domingo (Spanish)
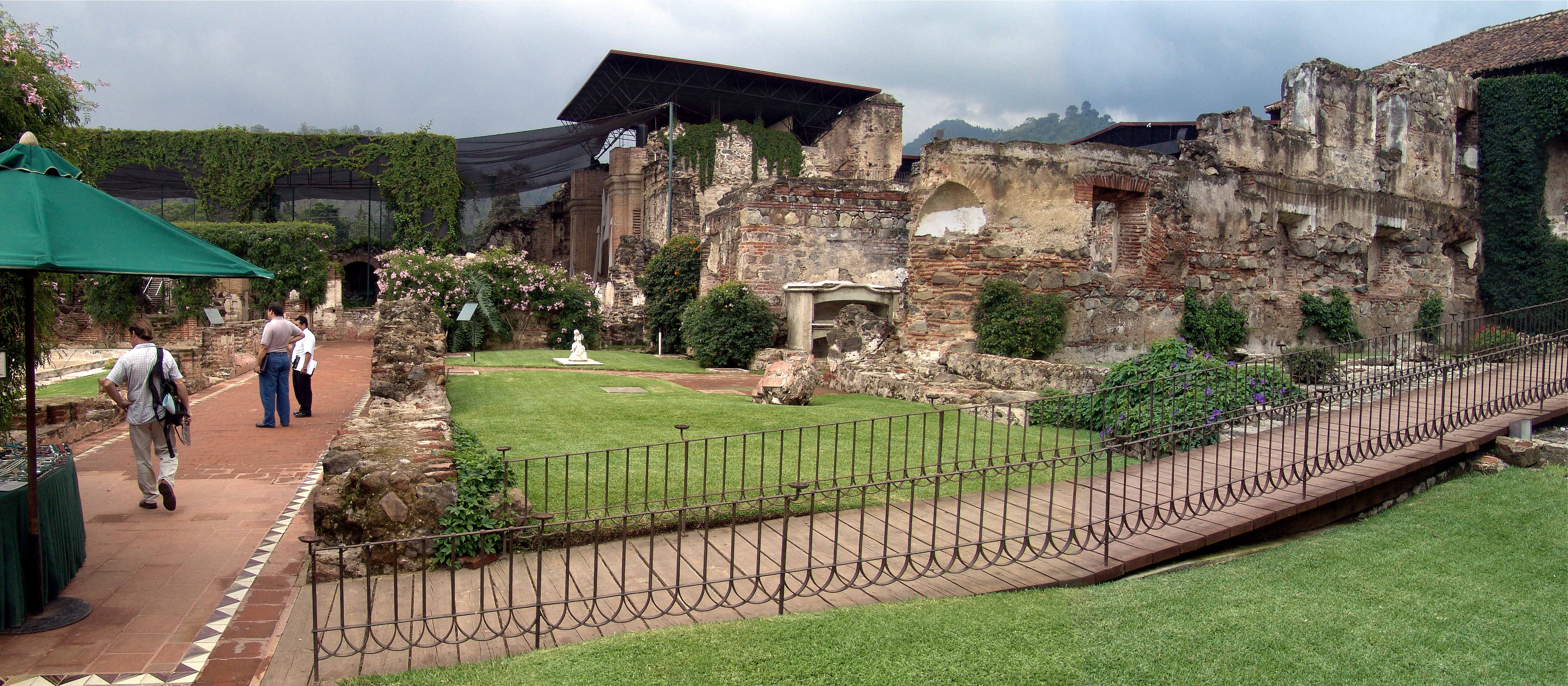
- Monastery courtyard

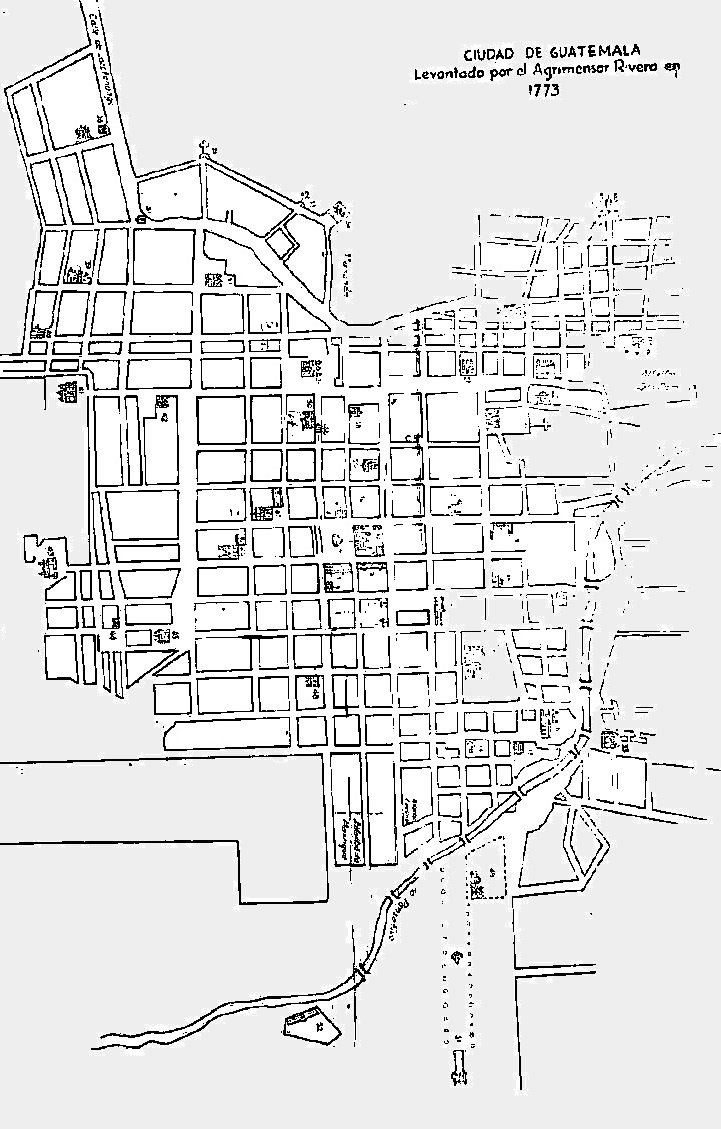
- Location within Antigua Guatemala

General information
- Architectural style: Spanish seismic baroque
- Location: Antigua Guatemala, Guatemala
- Coordinates: 14°33′30.928″N 90°43′36.430″W
- Demolished: 1751 earthquake; Santa Marta earthquake in 1773
- Owner: Private property

Santo Domingo Church and Monastery is a ruined monastery in Antigua Guatemala, Guatemala. Its history can be traced back to 1538 when the Dominicans arrived in Guatemala. It had two towers with ten bells and the monastery was filled with treasures. The monastery was destroyed in the 1773 Santa Marta earthquake. Today, part of the ruins have been transformed into a hotel, the Hotel Casa Santo Domingo.
