= Wonder World 520 =

Skyscraper hotel in Zhubei, Hsinchu County, Taiwan

Wonder World 520 豐采520
- Interactive map of the Wonder World 520 豐采520 area

General information
- Status: Under construction
- Type: Hotel, Residential, Retail
- Location: Zhubei City, Hsinchu County, Taiwan
- Coordinates: 24.819486899142948°N 121.02829412215846°E
- Construction started: 2020
- Completed: 2023

Height
- Architectural: 129 m (423 ft)

Technical details
- Floor count: 32
- Floor area: 190,718 m^{2} (2,052,870 sq ft)

Wonder World 520 (Chinese: 豐采520) is twin skyscraper complex under construction in Zhubei City, Hsinchu County, Taiwan. The tower will be 129 m (423 ft) tall, with 32 floors above ground and 6 basement levels. The project is designed to be a mixed-use complex, housing a Sheraton hotel, 890 residential units as well as a shopping center. Construction of the complex began in 2020 and will be completed by 2023. It will become the tallest building in the city.

== See also ==
- List of tallest buildings in Taiwan
- CIWC Tower
