= Ambassador Hotel Hsinchu =

Skyscraper hotel in East District, Hsinchu City, Taiwan

Ambassador Hotel Hsinchu 新竹國賓大飯店
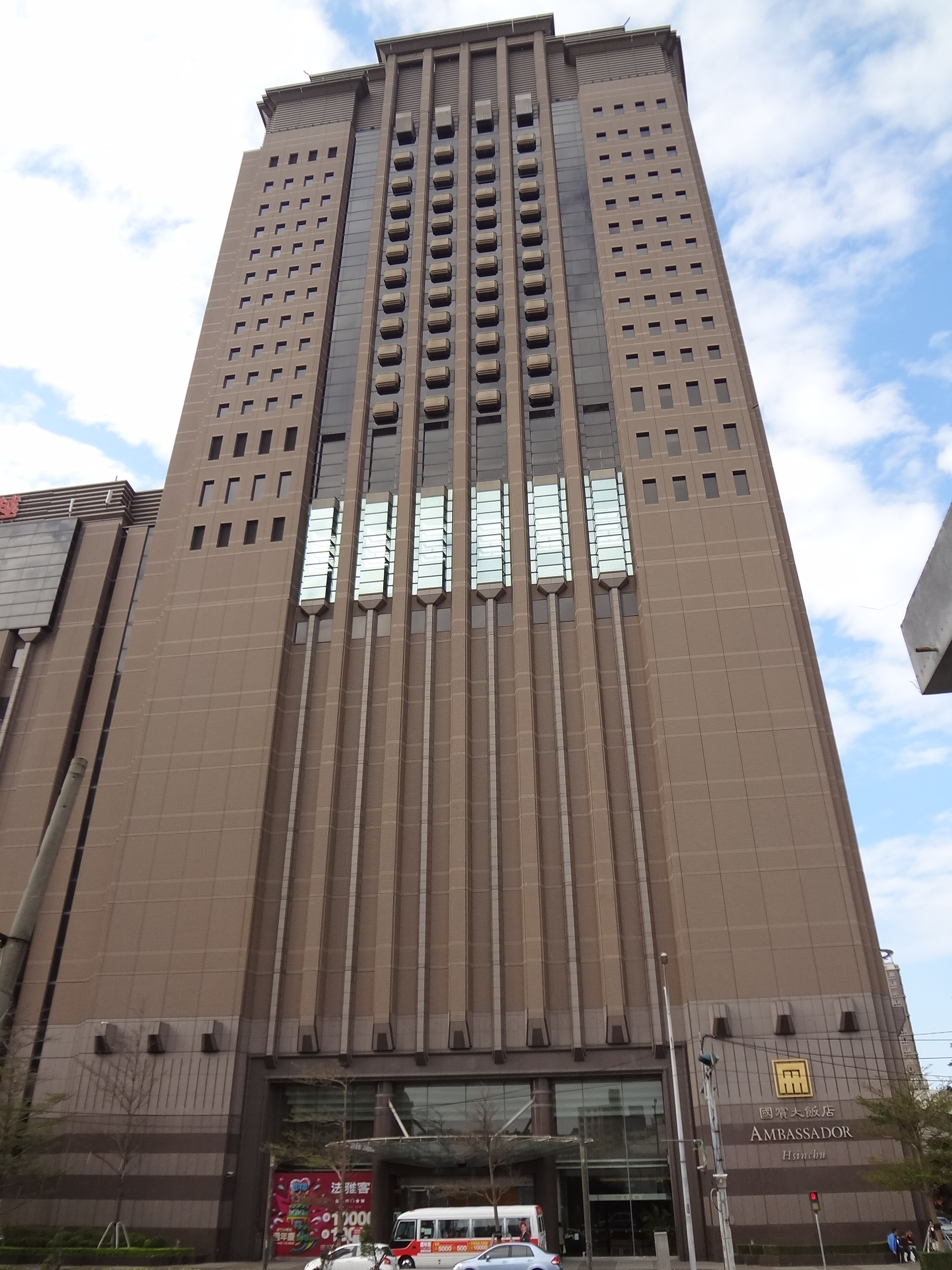
- Interactive map of Ambassador Hotel Hsinchu 新竹國賓大飯店

General information
- Type: Hotel
- Location: No. 188, Section 2, Zhonghua Road, East District, Hsinchu, Taiwan
- Coordinates: 24.806500106344856°N 120.97810372511914°E
- Completed: 2001

Height
- Architectural: 130 m (430 ft)

Technical details
- Floor count: 24
- Floor area: 76,908 m^{2} (827,830 sq ft)

The Ambassador Hotel Hsinchu (traditional Chinese: 新竹國賓大飯店; simplified Chinese: 新竹国宾大饭店; pinyin: Xīnzhú Guóbīn Dà Fàndiàn) is skyscraper hotel completed in 2001 in East District, Hsinchu, Taiwan. The architectural height of the building is 130 m (430 ft), with a floor area of 76,908 m^{2} (827,830 sq ft), and it comprises 24 floors above ground and four basement levels. When the building was completed in 2001, it was the tallest building in Hsinchu. It held the title for 15 years before being surpassed by CIWC Tower in 2016.

== The Hotel ==
The location of the hotel is situated in the Hsinchu city center, with close proximity to Hsinchu Science Park, Hsinchu railway station and Hsinchu HSR station. The hotel has a total of 257 rooms including 16 premium suites, themed restaurants, one café and a bar. It also offers seven multi-functional meeting rooms, with a ballroom situated on the 10th floor, which has a 7-meter high ceiling and 760 m^{2} (8,200 sq ft) of unobstructed floor space. The hotel also features a 20-meter temperature-controlled swimming pool with city views as well as a gym with cardio and weight equipment, sauna, and a steam room.

=== Restaurants & Bars ===
- A Cut Steakhouse: Restaurant offering steaks as well as wine.
- The Chinese Restaurant: Chinese restaurant featuring traditional Cantonese cuisine as well as Dim Sum and Peking duck.
- Promenade: Buffet offering a wide variety of dishes from around the globe, including Chinese, Japanese, and Western cuisine.
- A Shabu: Shabu-shabu restaurant located on the 12th floor.
- Corner Bakery 63: Offers freshly baked pastries and cakes

== See also ==
- Mandarin Oriental, Taipei
- Ambassador Hotel Kaohsiung
- Sheraton Hsinchu Hotel
