= Ambassador Theatre =

Ambassador Theatre, or close variants thereof, may refer to:

== United States ==
- Ambassador Theater (Baltimore, Maryland)
- Ambassador Theatre (Broadway), New York City
- Ambassador Theatre (St. Louis)
- Ambassador Theater (Washington, D.C.)

== Elsewhere ==
- Ambassador Theatre (Dublin), an events venue and former cinema in Ireland
- Ambassador Theatres, a cinema chain in Taiwan
- Ambassadors Theatre (London), a small West End theatre in England, known as the New Ambassadors Theatre from 1999 to 2007
- Ambassadors Theatre (Perth), a former cinema and theatre in Australia

== See also ==
- Ambassador Theatre Group, former name of ATG Entertainment, a live entertainment organisation headquartered in the United Kingdom
