= Hotel Casa Santo Domingo =

Hotel in Guatemala

Coordinates: 14°33′31″N 90°43′40″W

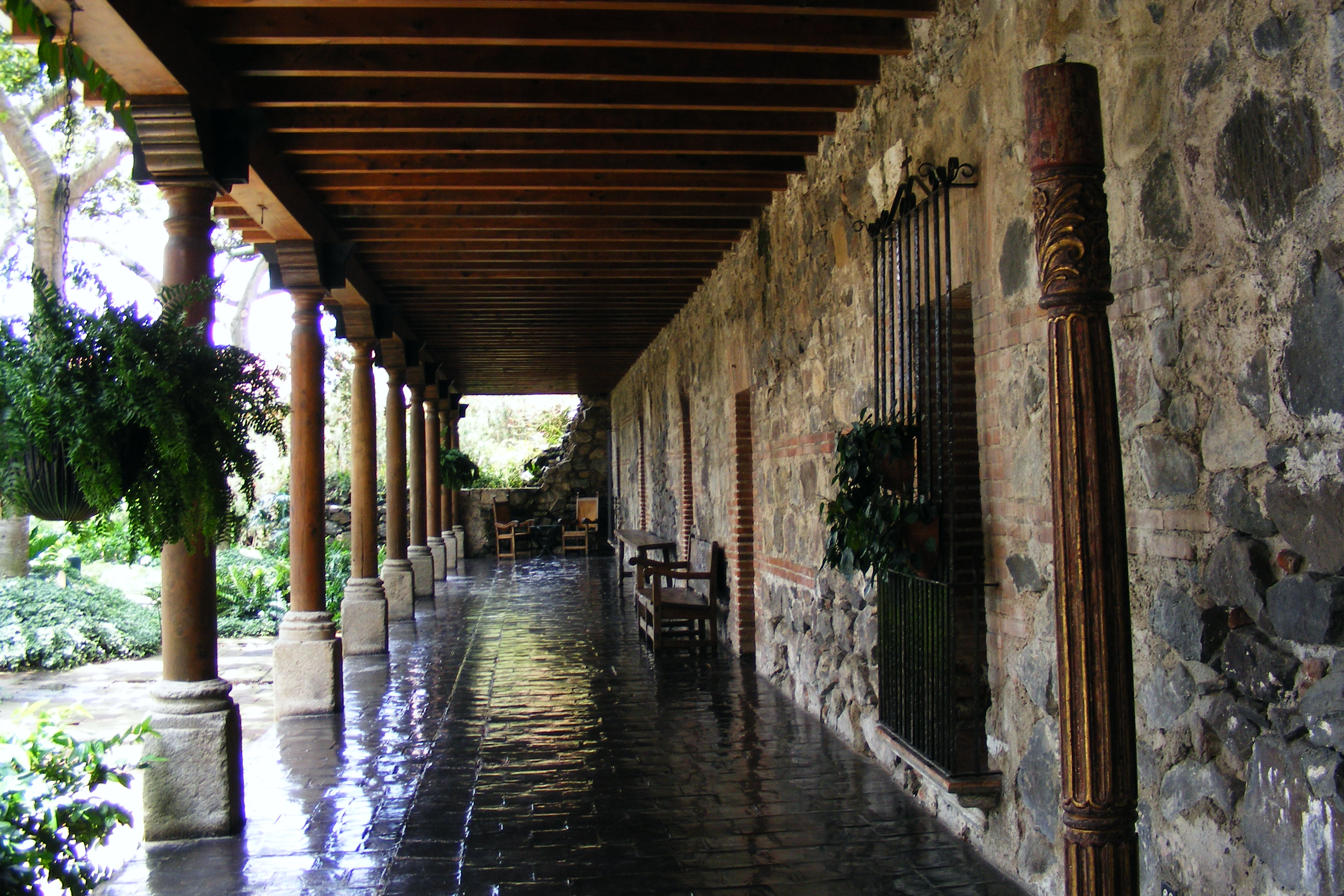
Exterior

The Hotel Casa Santo Domingo is a noted 5 star hotel and museum in Antigua Guatemala, Guatemala. It is located in the grounds of the Santo Domingo Monastery. This monastery was partially destroyed in the Santa Marta earthquake.

The hotel opened in June 1989.

== Gallery ==
=== Hotel ===
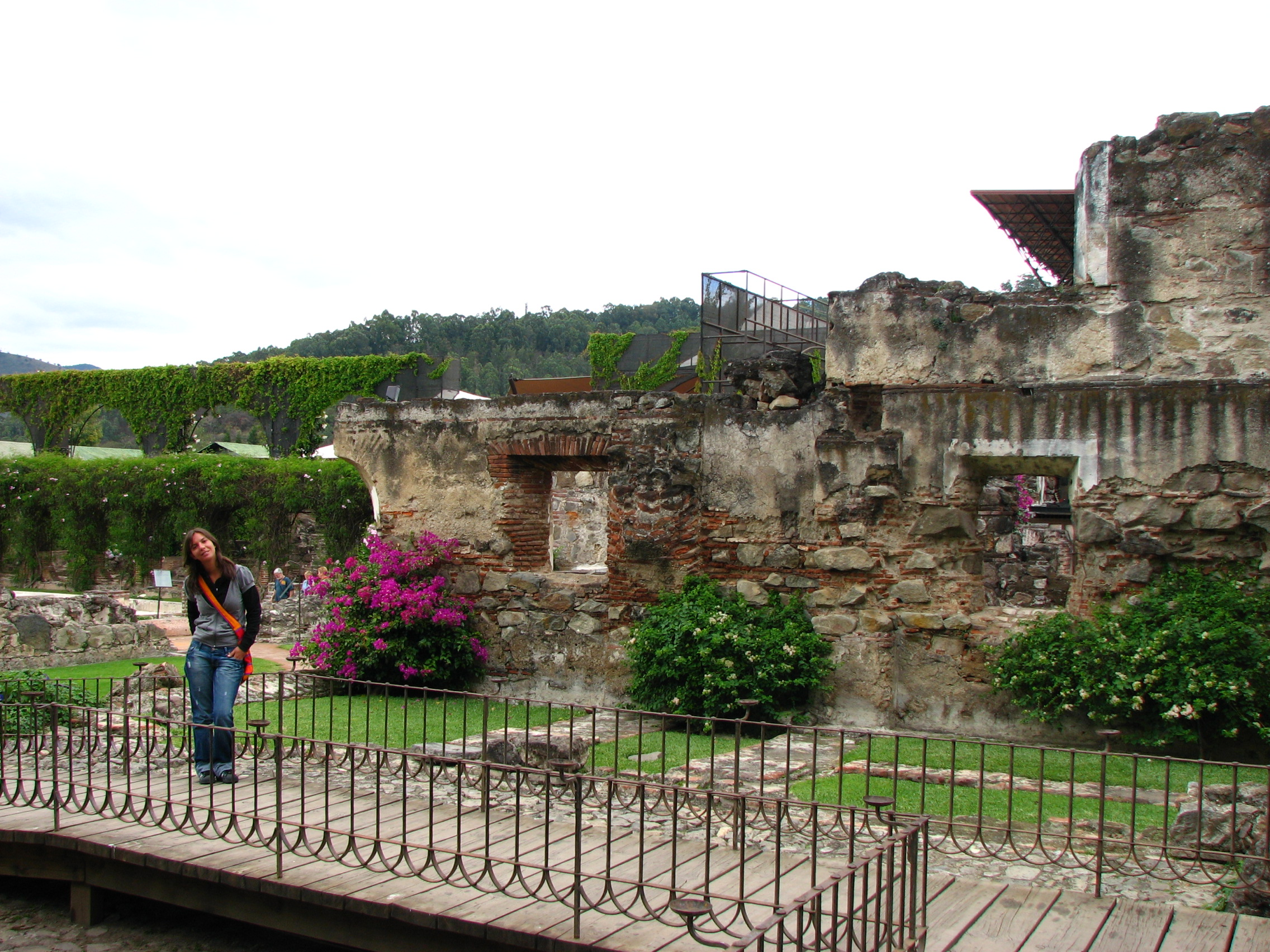
Hotel grounds

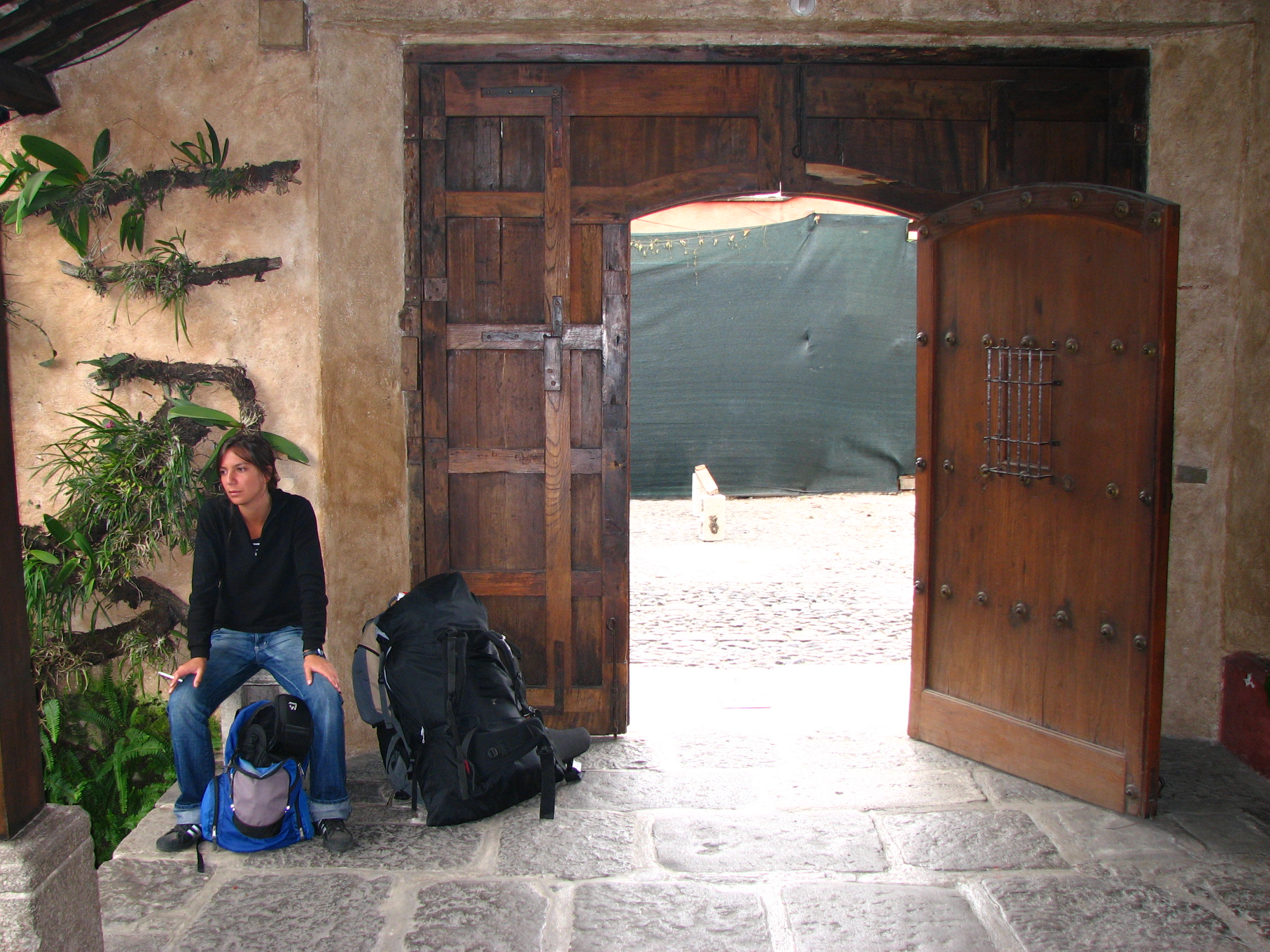
Front door

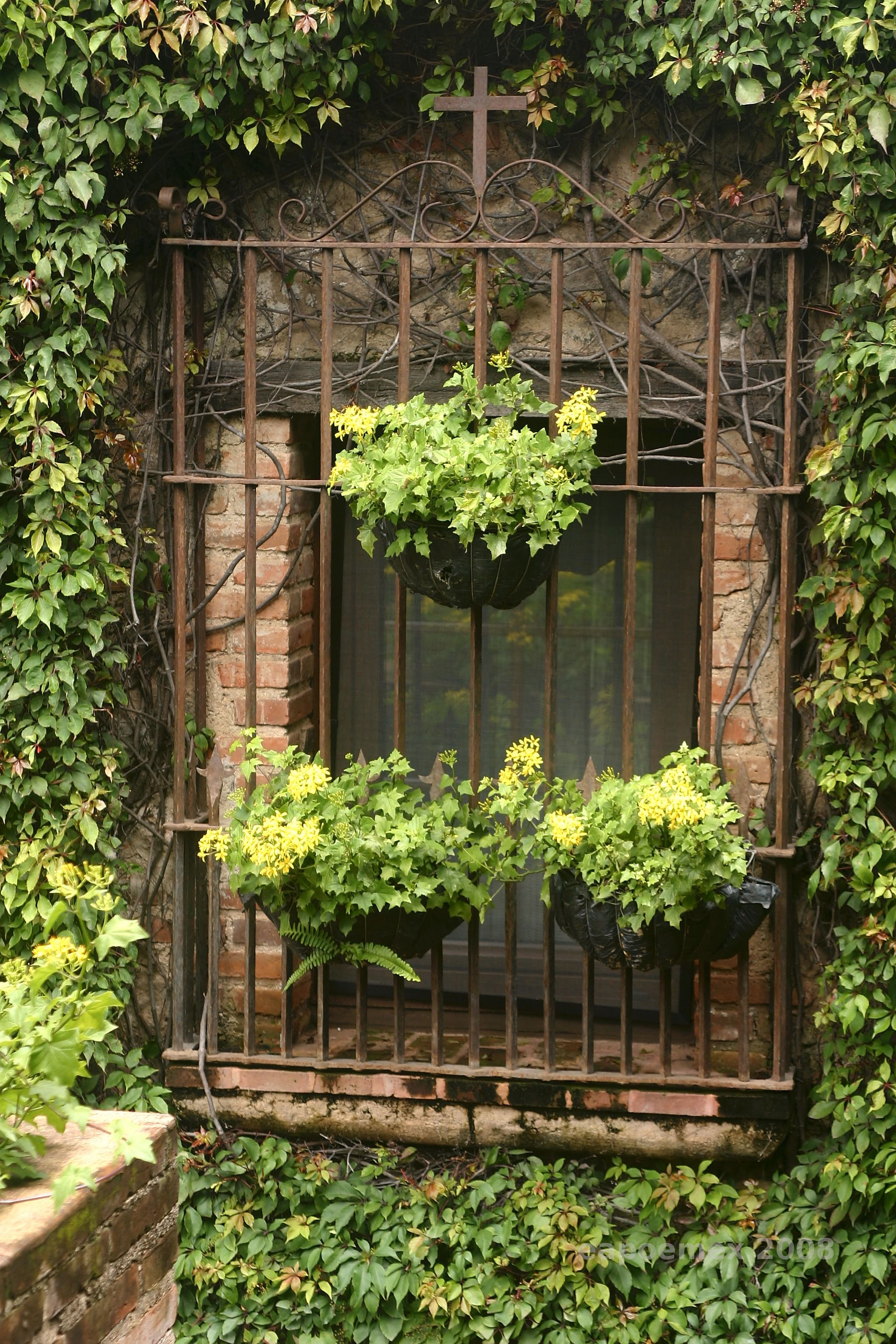
Old hotel window

=== Museum artifacts ===
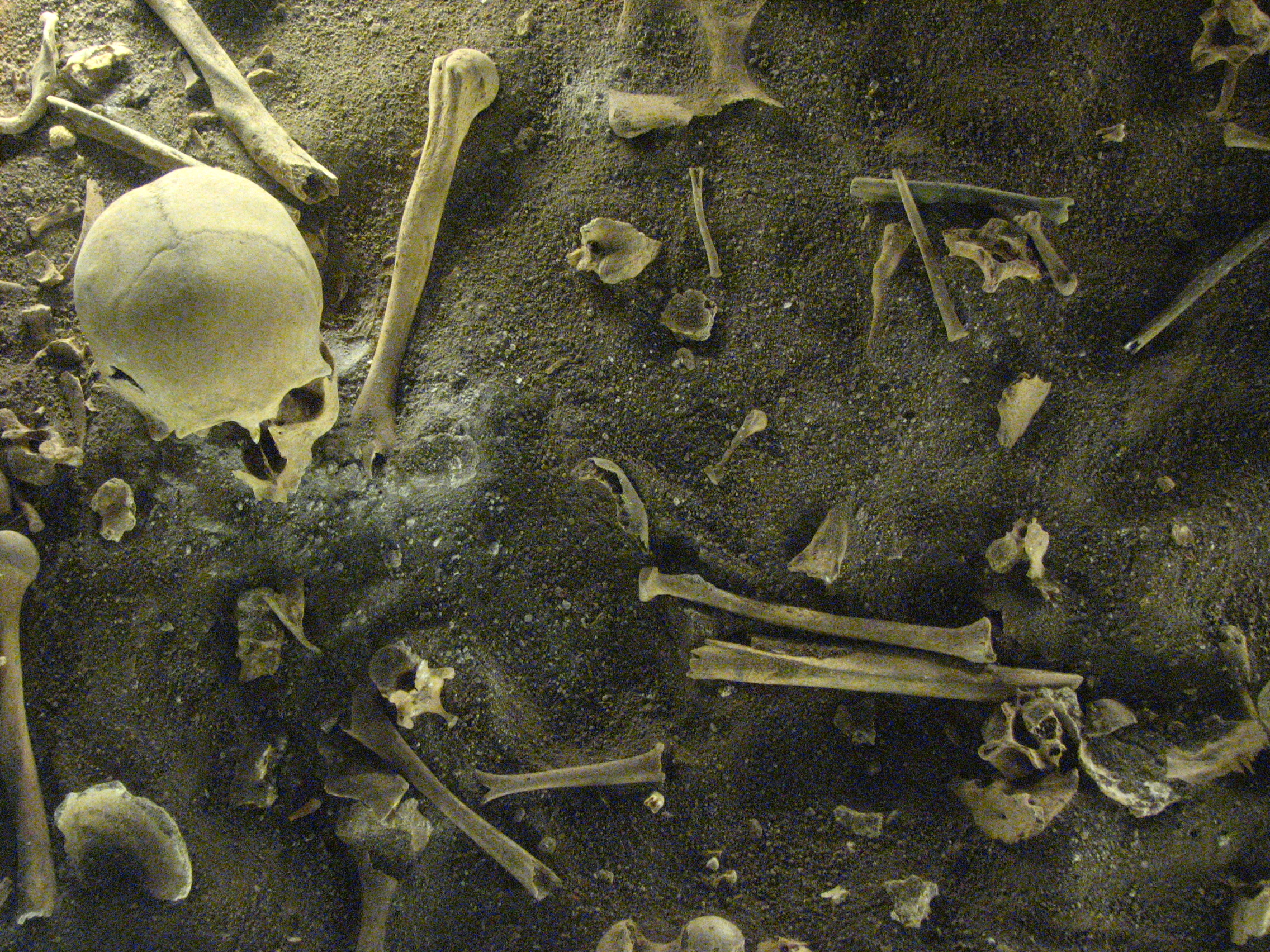

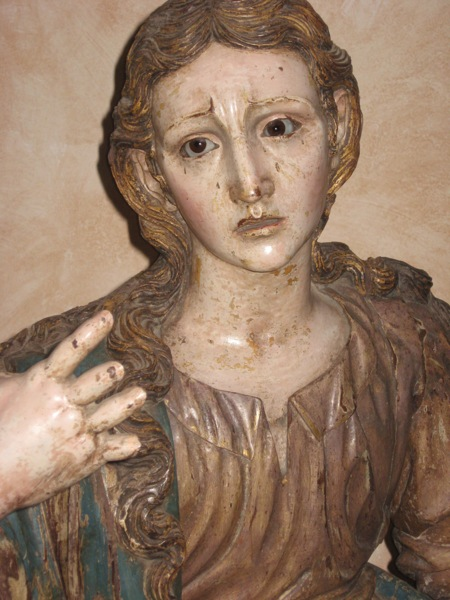

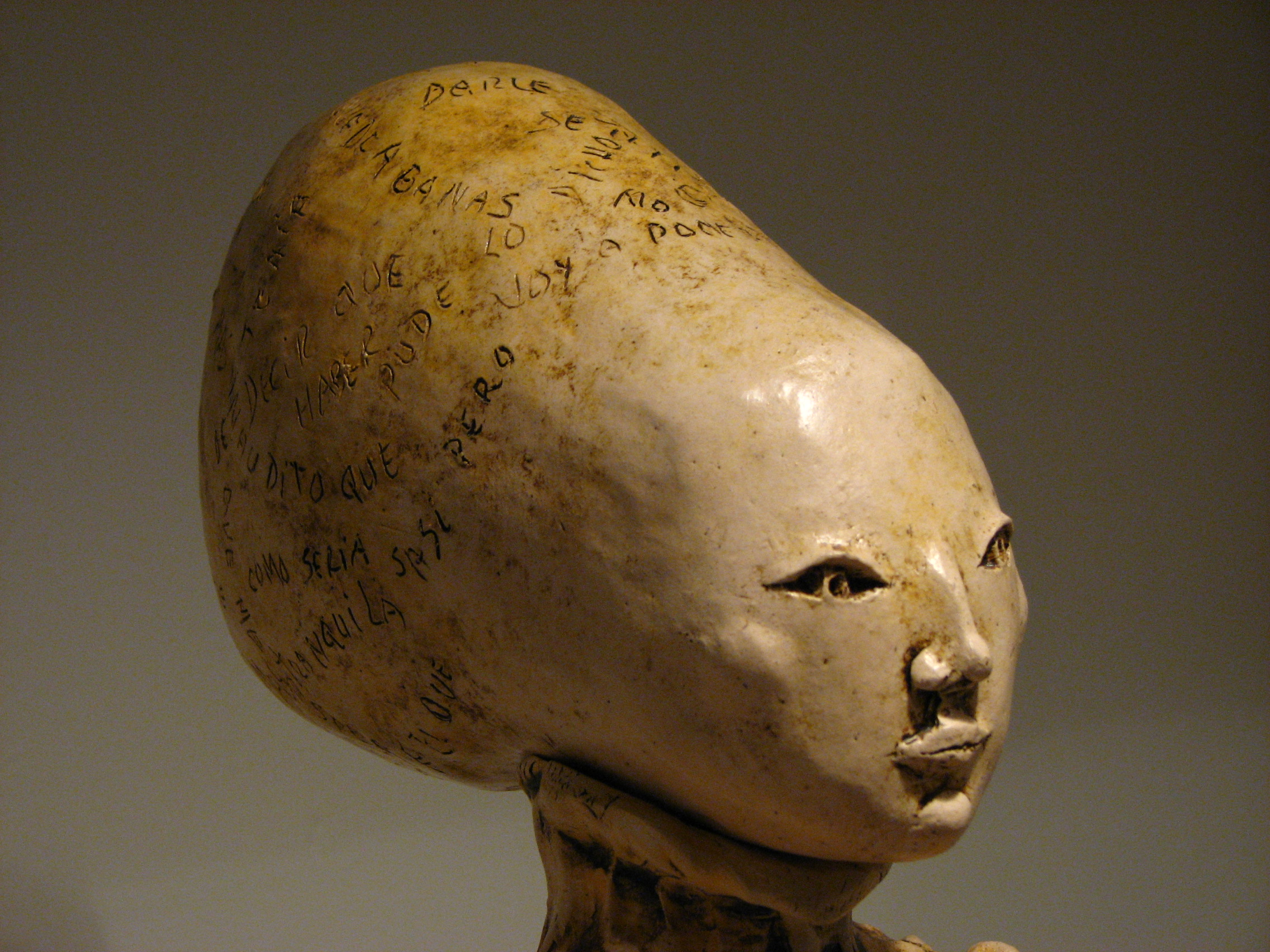

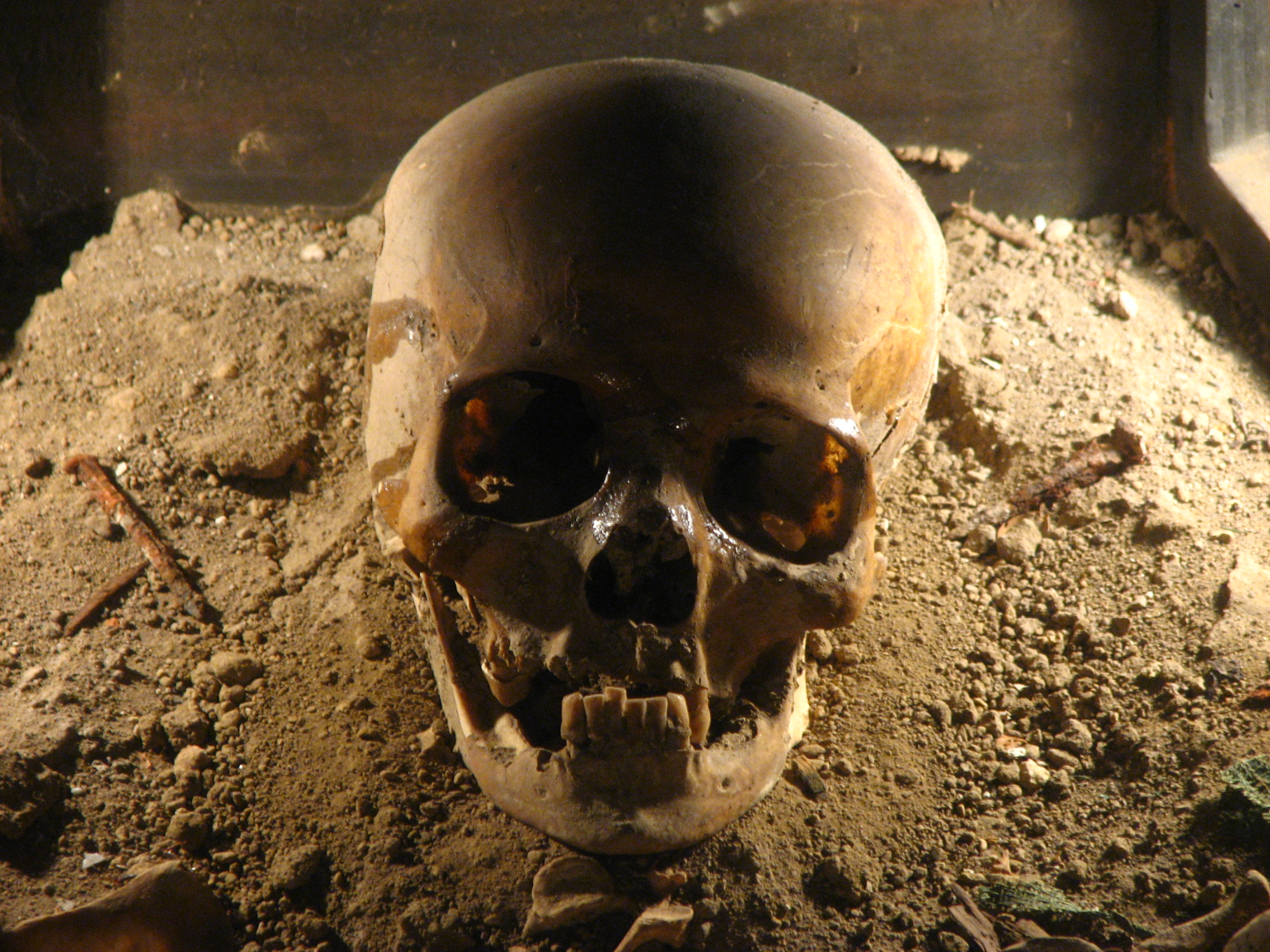
