= CIWC Tower =

Skyscraper in Hsinchu City, Taiwan

CIWC Tower 豐邑雲智匯
- Interactive map of the CIWC Tower 豐邑雲智匯 area

General information
- Status: Completed
- Type: Office, Retail
- Location: No. 118 Ciyun Road, Hsinchu City, Taiwan
- Coordinates: 24°47′27″N 121°0′45″E
- Completed: 2016

Height
- Architectural: 135 m (443 ft)

Technical details
- Floor count: 30
- Floor area: 64,370 m^{2} (692,900 sq ft)

Design and construction
- Architects: Lai & Chao Architects & Associate+Huang Zhengfu Architect & Associates

The CIWC Tower (traditional Chinese: 豐邑雲智匯; simplified Chinese: 丰邑云智汇; pinyin: Fēng yì yún zhì huì) is a skyscraper office building located in Hsinchu City, Taiwan. The building was completed in 2016, with a total floor area of 64,370 m^{2} (692,900 sq ft) and a height of 135 m (443 ft) that comprise 30 floors above ground, as well as five basement levels. As of January 2021, it is the tallest building in Hsinchu City.

== Design ==
The building was designed by the Taiwanese architectural firms Lai & Chao Architects & Associate and Huang Zhengfu Architect & Associates in the postmodern style. The building's design adopts a futuristic sensation by utilising a glass façade.

== Location ==
Situated on the main road between Hsinchu Science Park and Zhubei City, the tower faces Costco Hsinchu Store and is adjacent to the Provincial Highway 68 that connects Zhudong and Hsinchu City.

== See also ==
- List of tallest buildings in Taiwan
- List of tallest buildings in Taipei
- Wonder World 520
