= Ambassador Hotel Kaohsiung =

Hotel in Qianjin, Kaohsiung, Taiwan

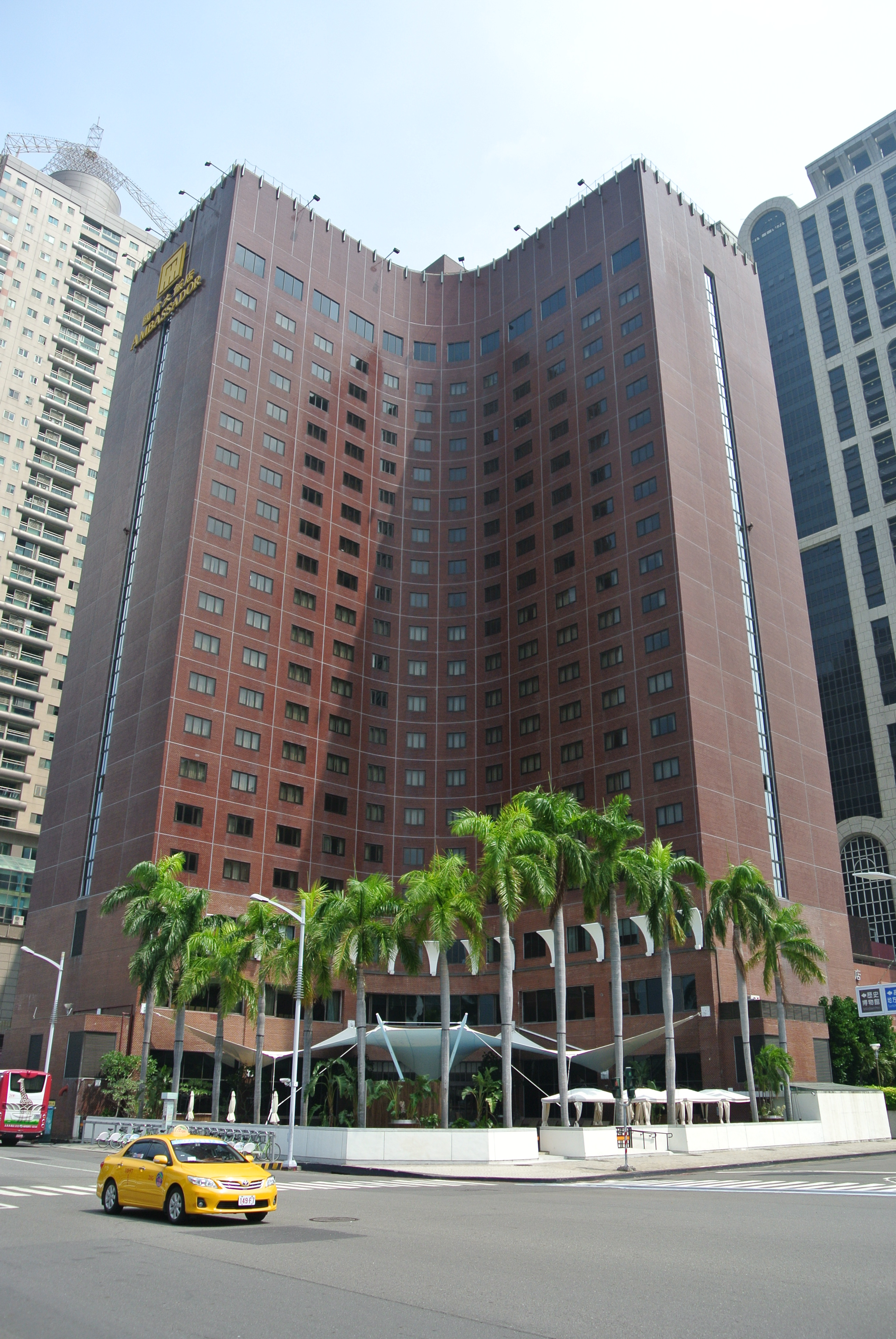

- Location within Taiwan

General information
- Location: No. 202, Minsheng 2nd Road, Qianjin District, Kaohsiung, Taiwan
- Coordinates: 22.624527707447935°N 120.29070509932858°E
- Opening: 1981
- Operator: The Ambassador Hotel Co., Ltd.

Technical details
- Floor count: 24

Other information
- Number of rooms: 453

Website
- Caesar Metro Taipei Website

Ambassador Hotel Kaohsiung (traditional Chinese: 高雄國賓大飯店; simplified Chinese: 高雄国宾大饭店; pinyin: Gāoxióng Guóbīn Dà Fàndiàn) is a 266 ft (81 m) tall five star hotel located on Minsheng 2nd Road, Qianjin District, Kaohsiung, Taiwan, which opened in 1981. The hotel has 453 guest rooms, and 24 floors. The hotel is operated by The Ambassador Hotel Co., Ltd.

== See also ==
- Ambassador Hotel Hsinchu
