= President and Ambassador Apartments =

- U.S. National Register of Historic Places
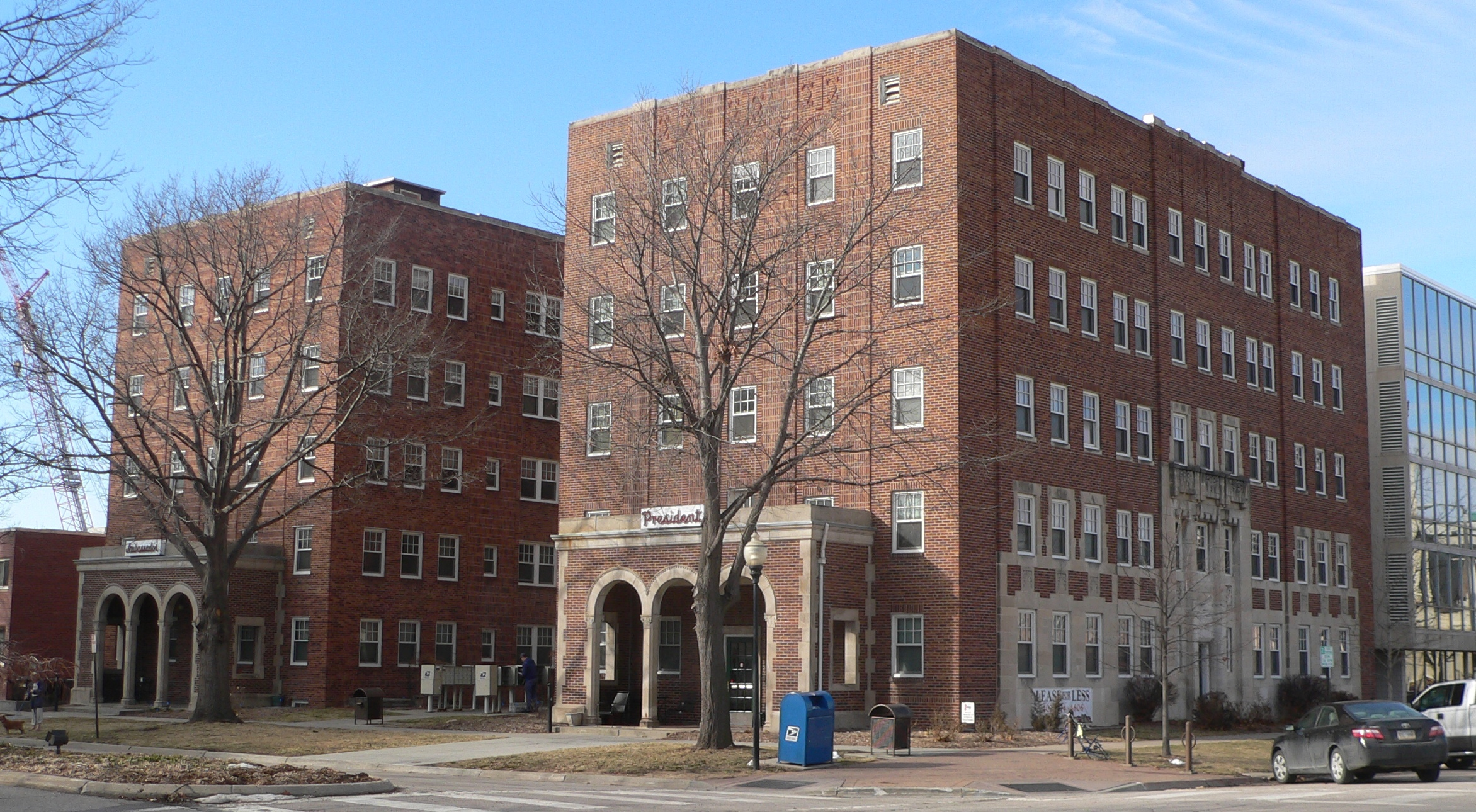
- The buildings in 2012

- Location within Nebraska Location within the United States
- Location: 1330 and 1340 Lincoln Mall, Lincoln, Nebraska
- Coordinates: 40°48′30″N 96°42′06″W
- Area: less than one acre
- Built: 1928
- Architect: John A. Alexander
- Architectural style: Art Deco
- NRHP reference No.: 93001401
- Added to NRHP: December 10, 1993

The President and Ambassador Apartments are two five-story apartment buildings in Lincoln, Nebraska. They were built in 1928–1929 on land owned by Levi Leland Coryell, and designed in the Art Deco style by architect John A. Alexander. They belonged to the L. L. Coryell Building Corporation until 1979. They have been listed on the National Register of Historic Places since December 10, 1993.
