= Makedonia Palace =

Hotel in Thessaloniki, Greece

Makedonia Palace Hotel
- Μακεδονία Παλλάς
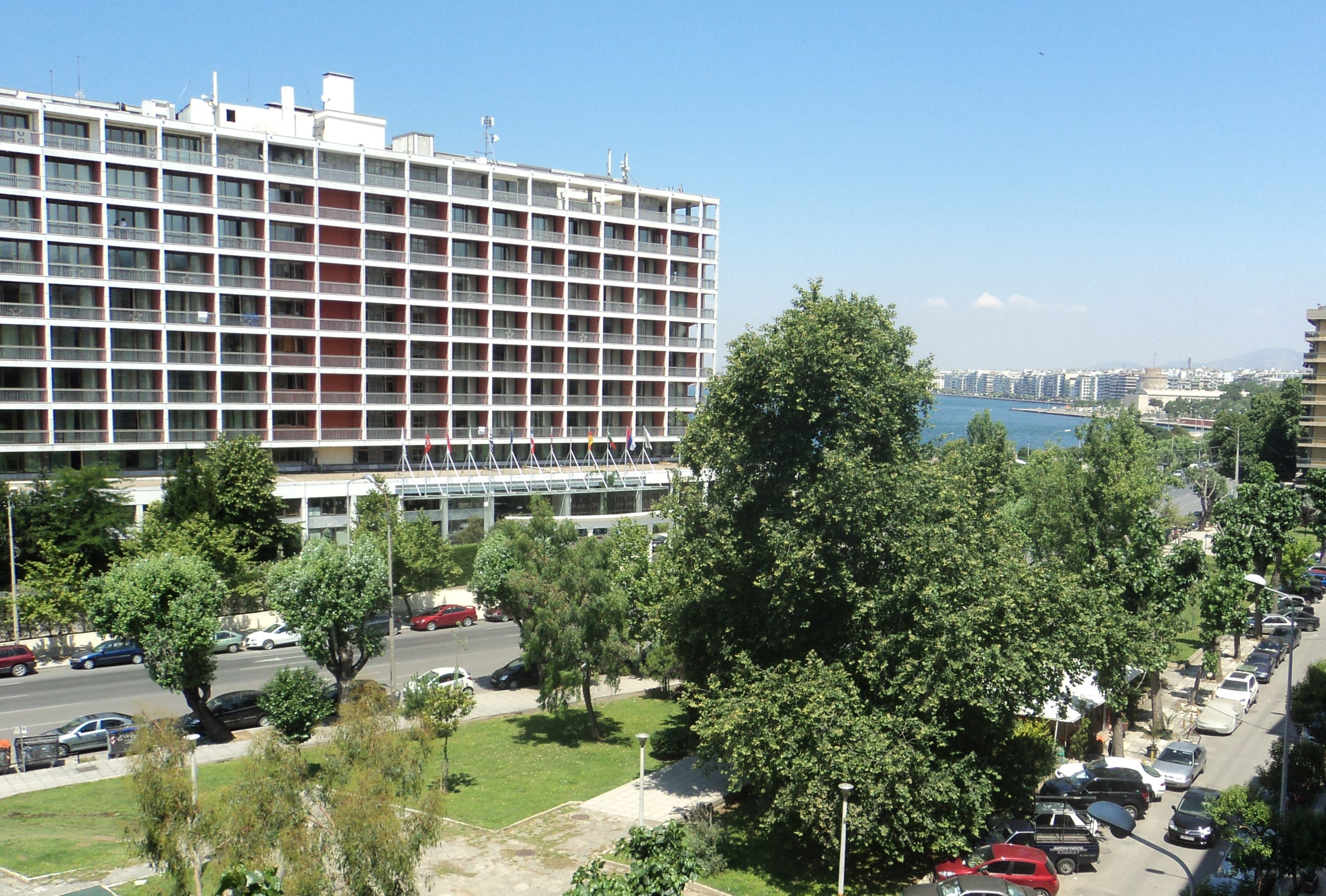
- Interactive map of the Makedonia Palace Hotel area

General information
- Type: Hotel
- Architectural style: Modern architecture
- Location: Thessaloniki, Greece, 2, Megalou Alexandrou Avenue 54640
- Coordinates: 40.6183°N 22.9526°E
- Construction started: 1962
- Completed: 1972
- Opened: 1972
- Renovated: 2017

Design and construction
- Architect: Constantinos Apostolou Doxiadis

Website
- Official hotel website

The Makedonia Palace (Greek: Μακεδονία Παλλάς) is a 5-star hotel located in Downtown Thessaloniki, Greece. The hotel is located on Megalou Alexandrou Avenue, by Thessaloniki's eastern urban waterfront.

The Makedonia Palace, designed by Constantinos Apostolou Doxiadis, opened in 1972. It has an expressive austerity, the structure shows clearly its standardisation.

It has 284 rooms and suites. Located on Thessaloniki's waterfront, it has views to the Thermaic Gulf. It is located a short distance from the city centre, the White Tower of Thessaloniki and the Thessaloniki International Exhibition Centre, where the Thessaloniki International Fair is held every year. Makedonia Palace is about 15 km away from Macedonia International Airport. The hotel is a major venue for both domestic and international congresses and conferences.

Every September, during the annual opening ceremony of the Thessaloniki International Fair, the Prime Minister of Greece stays at Makedonia Palace along with most of the Cabinet. The hotel has also hosted many Greek and international celebrities, including Russian president Vladimir Putin, XIKI, Chuck Norris, Faye Dunaway, Colin Farrell and Catherine Deneuve, during their stay in the city.

The hotel is owned by the IKA (Greece's social security fund), and was managed by The Daskalantonakis Group. In 2014, Belterra Investments, owned by Ivan Savvidis, leased the hotel through a 30-year contract, at a €1.7 million annual rent.

The building is a landmark at Thessalonikis' new seafront (Nea Paralia), remodelled in exemplary manner by Nikiforidis - Cuomo Architects.
