= Ambasador Hotel =

Hotel in central Niš, Serbia

Coordinates: 43.3210°N 21.8967°E

Ambasador Hotel Хотел Амбасадор
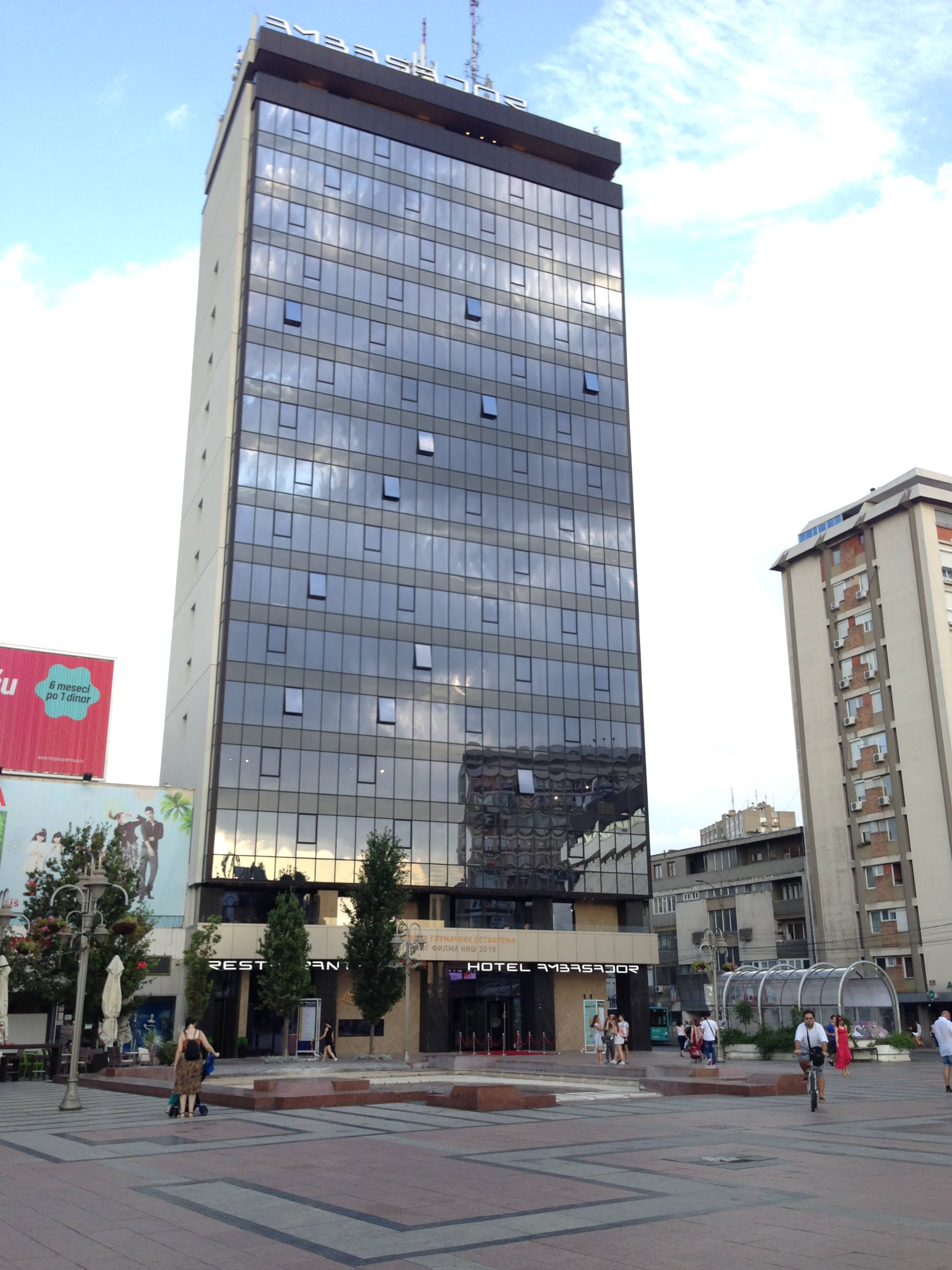
- The hotel after its reconstruction, 2019

General information
- Location: King Milan's Square
- Opening: 1968; 2017–2019 (Renovated)
- Owner: My Place Group

Height
- Height: 52.3m

Technical details
- Floor count: 17

Other information
- Number of rooms: 70
- Number of suites: 12
- Parking: Yes

Website
- www.hotelambasador.rs

The Ambasador Hotel (Serbian: Hotel Ambasador, Хотел Амбасадор) is a landmark hotel in the center of Niš, Serbia. It is the city's only five-star hotel.

First opened in 1968, it was the tallest building in Niš until the construction of the TV5 highrise in 1973. Located in a prominent location on Kralj Milan (King Milan) Square, next to the Monument to the Liberators of Niš, and near the Nišava river and the Ottoman-era Niš Fortress, the hotel is considered by locals to be one of the city's primary symbolic landmarks.

== History ==
The first hotel in Niš, the Hotel Orijent, was constructed on the site where the Ambasador Hotel stands today. It was opened in 1899. In 1960, the city demolished the Hotel Orijent with the intention of constructing a trade union hall. However, the funding for this project dried up and the halted construction site became an eyesore. The city then decided to subdivide the land and grant usage rights to several organizations and businesses, including a local hospitality enterprise called Srbija-Turist, which repurposed the unfinished building, finished its construction, and opened the Ambasador Hotel in 1968.

In its heyday, the hotel hosted numerous local and international celebrities and politicians, including Yugoslav President Josip Broz Tito, and actors Elizabeth Taylor and Richard Burton when they attended the 1973 Niš Film Festival to present the film Battle of Sutjeska, in which Burton played a younger Broz.

=== Closure and Reopening ===
Ownership of the hotel changed hands in the early 21st century and it was closed in 2013, after 45 consecutive years in business.

In 2016, the hotel was acquired at auction by My Place Group for approximately €850,000. It was subsequently renovated and reopened in 2019.
