= Hotel Palm Camayenne =

Hotel in Conakry, Guinea

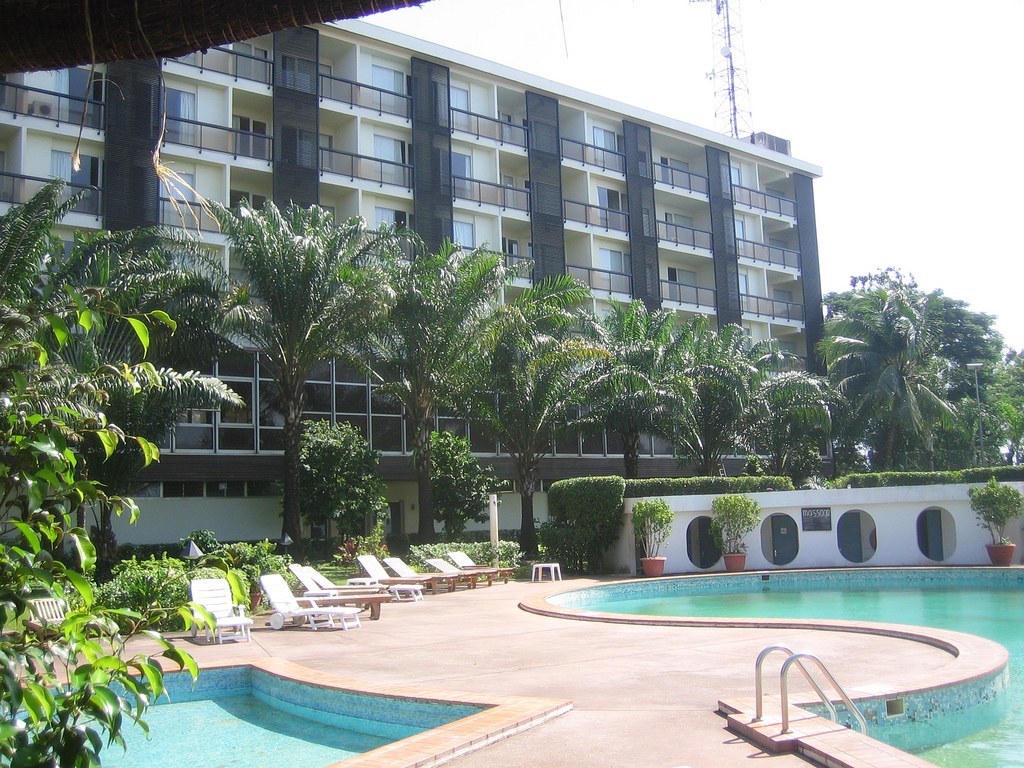

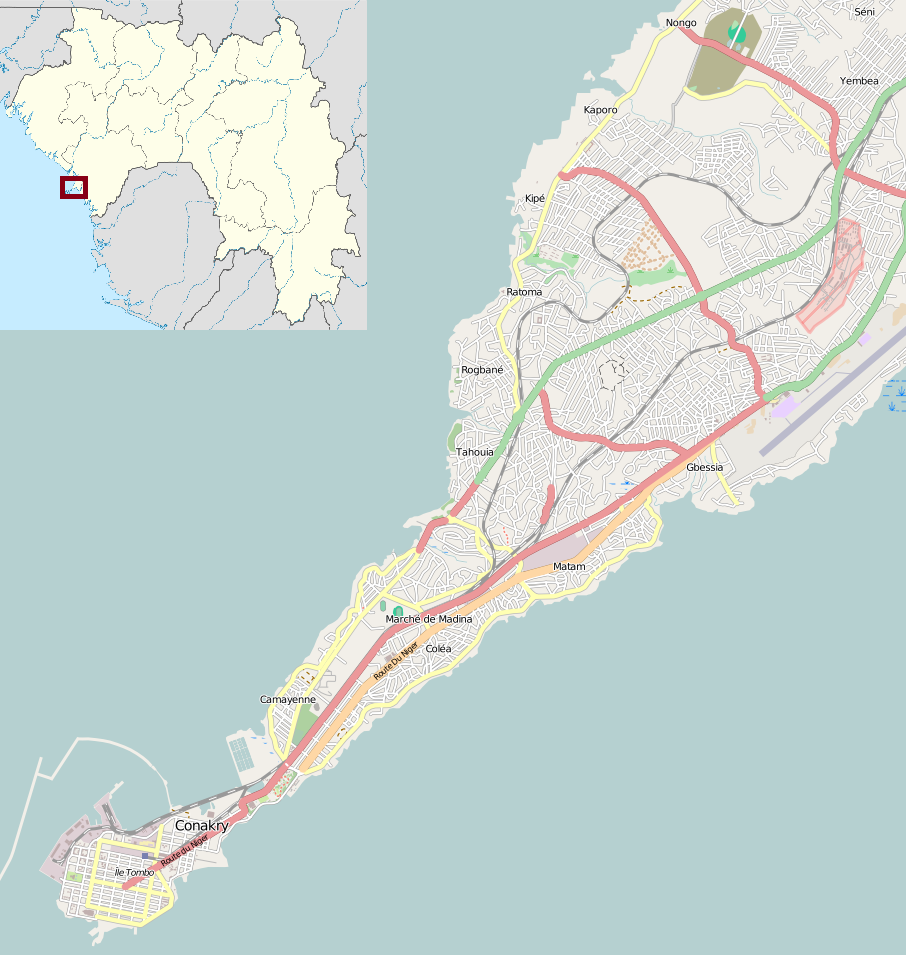
- Location within Conakry

General information
- Location: Conakry, Guinea
- Coordinates: 9.535323°N 13.689061°W
- Opening: 1964

Other information
- Number of rooms: 120

The Hotel Palm Camayenne is a hotel in Conakry, Guinea. Set beside the sea, it is one of Conakry's most famous (and most expensive) hotels.

== History ==
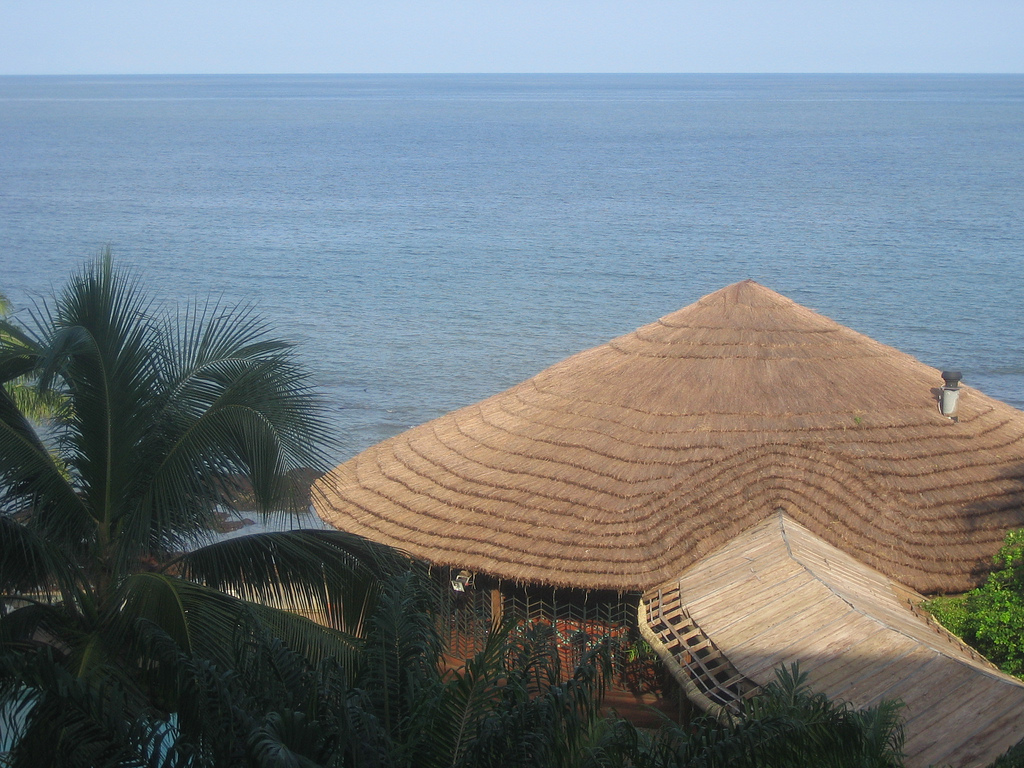
The ocean at the hotel

The hotel was constructed by the Russians. It is built block-style, and most of the rooms have a pleasant view. Although completed in April 1964, the hotel lacked essential equipment. For example, the Russians did not supply cutlery, linen or kitchen equipment. Six months later, the equipment was still missing. The building was not well finished, and when the rainstorms associated with the violent tornadoes of the area came, many problems emerged requiring costly repairs. Construction of the hotel and other projects was funded by repayable loans from the Russians, causing Guinea to fall into debt that was difficult to repay.

In 1984, the military regime awarded the management contract for the 120-room Hotel Camayenne, and for the Hotel G'Bessia with 168 rooms, to the French firm Accor. By 1990, the hotel, serving a clientele of business people and aid workers, was being refurbished under a line of credit provided by the Ministry of Planning and International Cooperation, using funding from the European Community. The hotel remained state property, but the management contract went to SHG (Société Hôtelière de Guinée) in which the Belgian airline Sabena had a majority stake. The hotel reopened in 1993 and became a Sabena-hotel. The Belgian airline had at the time a big presence in Guinea with 3 and later 4 weekly connections with Belgium. After the airline went bankrupt in 2001, the hotel remained operational under the Sabena receivership until 2006.

As of January 2011, the hotel had been closed for over five years, and required major renovations to come up to international standards. When the hotel was closed, the 105 employees were laid off. When they tried to seek compensation, demonstrating in front of the hotel, the police broke up the demonstration violently. A reporter trying to cover the negotiations with the new owner was badly beaten up. In December 2010, it was reported that the owner, Lebanese businessman Michel Chater, appeared to have finalized the purchase from the government, although the new president Professor Alpha Condé had said he would recover any state property that had been sold incorrectly. Chater had also taken over the grand hotel l'Unité, renamed Riviera Royals Hotel. Chater, CEO of the Riviera Group, said he was committed to the hotel's rehabilitation at a cost of up to US$12 million.

== Location and facilities ==
The shore is rocky. However, the hotel has a small beach, a swimming pool, fitness center and tennis courts. The embassies of Saudi Arabia and Iran are both near to the hotel. The Superbobo supermarket, also near the hotel, carries imported items.

== See also ==
- List of buildings and structures in Guinea
