= Ambassadors Theatre (Perth) =

Former theatre and cinema in Perth, Western Australia,

- Interactive map of the Ambassadors Theatre area

General information
- Status: Demolished
- Location: 164–168 Hay Street, Perth, Western Australia, Australia
- Coordinates: 31°57′18″S 115°51′36″E
- Construction started: 1928
- Completed: 1929
- Renovated: 1937
- Demolished: 1972

Ambassadors Theatre was a theatre and cinema in Hay Street, Perth, between 1929 and 1972.

Constructed beginning in 1928, following a visit to the United States by the head of Union Theatres. It was completed and opened in 1929.

In its initial years, the theatre had stage, music and cinema as part of the format of events.

Much of the ornamentation incorporated in the 1929 design was changed during renovations in the late 1930s.

It closed and was demolished in 1972.
