= Hotel Museo Uxlabil =

Museum and hotel in Guatemala

Coordinates: 14.5573°N 90.7343°W

The Hotel Museo Uxlabil was a museum and hotel in Antigua Guatemala, Guatemala. It belonged to the wealthy Pellecer family for five generations. The property was acquired in 2009 and renamed Hotel Casa Antigua.

Inside the hotel there are many valuable pieces. There is also a bathroom tub made of marble which is believed to weigh two tons.

In one room there are two very large paintings painted sometime between 1850 and 1860 by Toribio Jerez, a noted Nicaraguan artist, demonstrating the ties the Pellecer had with Nicaraguan high society. Both portraits are of eminent church pastors.

In Sept 2009 the property was acquired, remodeled and renamed Hotel Casa Antigua:

"This hotel was formerly a 10-room hotel by the name of "Hotel Museo Uxlabil". We acquired the property in Sept 2009 and remodeled all of those hotel rooms and also remodeled the adjacent property behind that were small apartments. This created a total of 22 spacious rooms, 3 large gardens, a rooftop terrace and many setting areas in the spacious hotel corridors."
