= BT Ambassador =

The BT Ambassador is a telephone private branch exchange switchboard. Manufactured for BT by the General Electric Company, it was discontinued in 1991. There was a larger version called Senator. Both systems used proprietary phones, allowed direct access to outside lines (with lamp indication), had an intercom facility and allowed basic call diversion. Apart from this, there were few features, and these systems are now obsolete. Ambassador systems handled 1 line & 3 extensions or 2 lines and 4 extensions, while the Senator could handle 5 lines and 10 extensions, depending on the cards in the control unit.

Well over 10 years after discontinuation used Ambassador and Senator equipment continued to be available on the second hand market in the United Kingdom. These days they could provide intercoms facilities for private homes but do not have much use in a modern office, due to lack of features and interoperability.
