= Ambassador (novel) =

2015 novel by William Alexander

First edition Cover art by Owen Richardson

Ambassador is a 2015 science fiction book written by William Alexander. The book is followed by sequel text Nomad, written in 2015. Both were published by Simon & Schuster. These books fall alongside some of Alexander’s more well-known fantasy books for children, such as Goblin Secrets (2013), which won the National Book Award.

== Plot ==
Gabe Fuentes, a remarkably ordinary 11-year old, has taken on an extraordinary adventure from Minneapolis, Minnesota to other worlds. The Envoy, a purple space blob, tasks Gabe with the role as Earth’s ambassador to the galaxy, which exposes him to a world of alien interaction and conflict. Meanwhile, back home Gabe’s Mexican-American family deals with alien problems of their own, as his parents confront the realities of deportation.

== Characters ==
Characters in the book include:

- Gabe Fuentes: protagonist, 11-year-old boy; serves as Ambassador for the Earth
- Isabelle Fuentes: native of Guadalajara, Mexico; tutors academic subjects; mother of four
- Octavio Fuentes: native of Guadalajara, Mexico; chef at local restaurant; father of four
- Guadalupe (Lupe) Fuentes: high school student; oldest of Fuentes children
- Noemi Fuentes: three-year old toddler girl; twin sibling
- Andrés Fuentes: three-year old toddler boy; twin sibling
- Envoy: purple alien creature; comes to recruit Gabe as Earth’s Ambassador
- Frankie: Gabe’s best friend; sent away for the summer to his father’s home in California
- Zora: Gabe’s pet parrot
- Garuda: Gabe’s pet iguana
- Sir Toby: Gabe’s pet silver fox

== Themes ==
In a 2015 interview with Luna Station Quarterly, William Alexander addressed the idea of being "alien" in his science fiction works. In describing his reasoning for exploring this concept, he notes, “I needed my protagonist to viscerally understand both the dangers and the advantages of belonging to more than one world at once. As a 2nd gen Caribbean immigrant it felt right, fitting, and obvious to make this an immigration story. I also couldn’t resist punning on the word ‘alien’”. In a 2019 interview with The Booking Biz, Alexander says, "my science-fiction books were inspired by two delightful words: 'ambassador' and 'neoteny.'" These conceptual frameworks shape the thematic elements of the book.

=== Neoteny ===
In biological terms, "neoteny" means "the retention of juvenile features in the adult animal." This definition applies to species, including humans. William Alexander notes that "empathy" and "curiosity" are among those neotenous traits.

In the text, the Envoy explains to Gabe why he was chosen as Ambassador, saying that "ambassadors should be young...or at least neotenous" (page 36). According to Alexander, unexpected animal friendships can be explained by this concept. In the book, the friendship between Gabe's pets, Zora, Garuda, and Sir Toby, display the atypical friendships of which he speaks.

William Alexander expressed his reasoning as to why he created Gabe's character as an ambassador, saying "Kids haven’t fixed the boundaries of their social world yet, so galactic ambassadors between different planets should always be kids."

=== Alien identity ===
The text addresses the notion of being "alien" in the context of Gabe's family's immigrant status. This theme is most explicitly addressed when Gabe discovers that his mother, father, and sister are undocumented immigrants. Gabe is informed by his mother that she and his father have been detained at the ICE detention center; Gabe's father fills in the details later, clarifying that they were detained after a police officer pulled him over for not making a complete stop at a stop sign. Gabe learns about his sister's immigration status when he presses her to explain why she went from being a straight-A student, to academically struggling. Although, Lupe resists telling Gabe the truth, she eventually discloses that her academic counselor, Mr. Arpaio, discourages her from pursuing higher education. Lupe says, "he's helping citizens get in by making sure aliens with perfect grades can't" (page 102) Later in their dialogue, she goes on to call herself "illegal". In the process of discovering his family's undocumented status, Gabe grapples with what it means to "talk to aliens thousands of light years away" (page 84), while processing his family's alien identity back home.

=== Immigration ===
In the text, the immigration story of Gabe's parents, Isabelle and Octavio, is revealed. Both of Gabe's parents are "tapatíos", or people who come from Guadalajara, Mexico (page 16). Gabe goes on to describe some of the cultural practices with which his family engages, which retains elements of their Mexican culture. He goes to grab a Coca-Cola from the fridge, but makes certain to distinguish it as a "Mexican Coke", going on to express his dislike for the American version of the drink (page 18). Further, he describes the happenings at his dinner table, noting that his family spoke to one another in "Spanish, English, and Spanglish" (page 21).

As Gabe is getting newly acquainted with his impending tasks as Ambassador, he encounters the United States immigration authorities. He learns that ICE, stands for the "Immigration and Customs Enforcement", and he puns the acronym describing his car ride to the ICE facilities as going to an "icy place in a pocket of icy silence" (page 78). He describes carrying his birth certificate with him to the center to have proof of his nationality and citizenship status if needed (page 79). As he speaks with his father, Gabe gains some understanding about the legal intricacies of the immigration system. He hears the legal terminology surrounding his mother's release from the center, as she is being released "on recognizance" (page 81). He also learns that his father, due to being deported once before cannot apply for reentry into the United States for another ten years (page 82). Gabe, as narrator, voices the experiences, much like these, of his immigrant family throughout the book.

== Reception ==
=== Accolades ===
- Eleanor Cameron Award Winner
- Junior Library Guild Selection
- International Latino Book Award Finalist
- Minnesota Book Award Finalist

=== Critical reception ===
Hector Tobar of The New York Times deems the book "an engaging and smart allegory about the hurt and strangeness of the modern immigrant condition." In the review, Tobar highlights the notion of being “alien” in the context of American immigration politics and the ways in which Ambassador intervenes in this narrative through science fiction. He calls attention to the connection between The Envoy as “alien” to Earth and Gabe’s family as “alien” to the United States. Further, he asserts that although the arrival of the Envoy into Gabe’s life was curious and unanticipated, that the unexpected immigration concerns of his family was far more upending. In both cases, aliens are being hidden and shielded from others.

Sarah Hunter of Booklist applauds Ambassador for "[injecting] meaningful depth into an exciting sci-fi adventure, perceptively exploring what it means to be alien while avoiding a heavy-handed message." Hunter highlights the technical aspects of the work which make it characteristic of the sci-fi genre, alongside the politically significant messaging which intervenes in a palatable way into American politics.
