= Porta Hotel Antigua =

Hotel in Antigua Guatemala, Guatemala

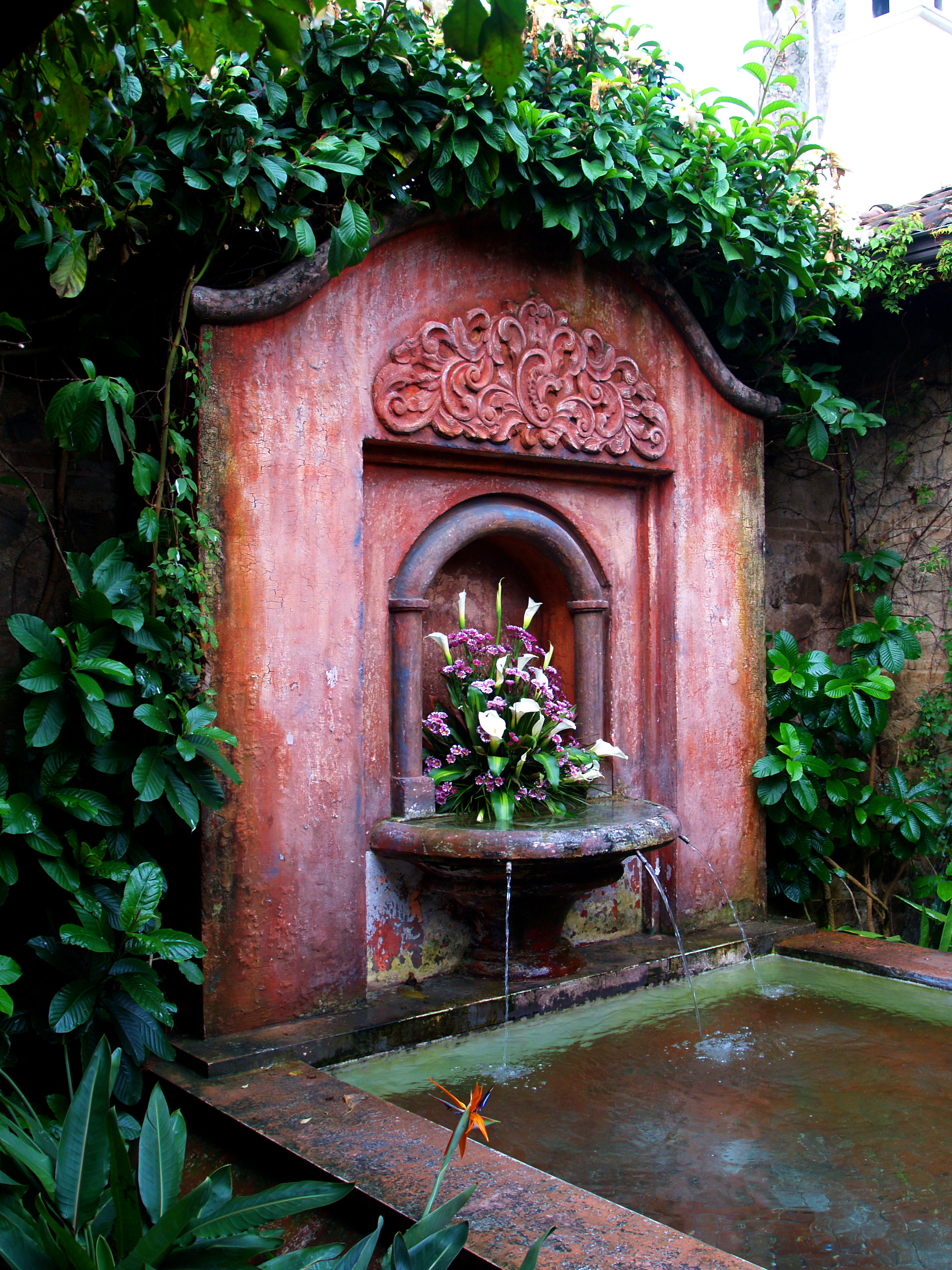
- Fountain in the hotel
- Interactive map of the Porta Hotel Antigua area

General information
- Location: 8 Calle Oriente, Antigua Guatemala, Guatemala
- Coordinates: 14.55293°N 90.73362°W
- Owner: Porta Hotels

Other information
- Number of rooms: 110
- Number of suites: 7
- Number of restaurants: 1

Website
- www.portahotels.com

The Porta Hotel Antigua is a luxury colonial-style hotel in Antigua Guatemala, Guatemala. It was previously called "Hotel Antigua".

== Location ==
The hotel is located on 8 Calle Poniente, between San Jose el Viejo and San Francisco churches. It is set in gardens with a terrace. The gardens have tropical vegetation, home to indigenous birds such as macaws, and a swimming pool.

== Architecture ==
The hotel's architecture has strong neo-colonial influences, with intricate features such as cupolas. There are 110 rooms, including 57 Premium rooms, 22 Deluxe rooms, 24 Standard rooms and 7 suites. The color themes, externally and internally, are generally terracotta and white. The rooms and restaurant have traditional Guatemalan decor, including stained hardwood floors.

== Services ==
The hotel is one of the oldest and best known hotels in the town and was voted one of the five top hotels in Central America by Condé Nast Traveler magazine, who also lists it on their Gold List of hotels. The hotel restaurant serves international and Guatemalan cuisine. The Ceiba Porta spa is located on the hotel premises, and provides a range of beauty and relaxation treatments.
