= Ambassador Apartments (Springfield, Missouri) =

- U.S. National Register of Historic Places
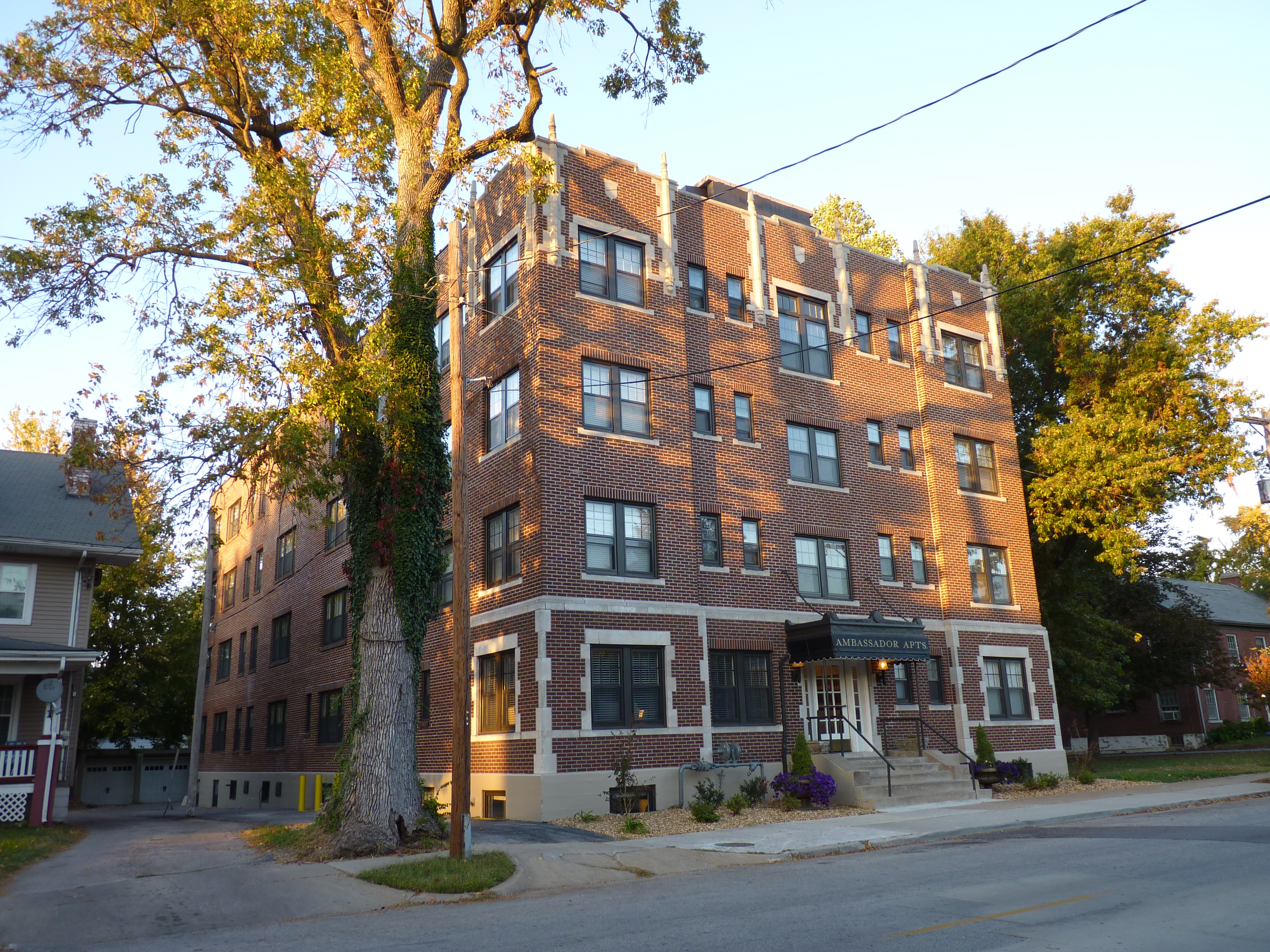
- Ambassador Apartments, October 2010

- Location within Missouri Location within the United States
- Location: 1235 E. Elm St., Springfield, Missouri
- Coordinates: 37°12′19″N 93°16′30″W
- Area: less than one acre
- Built: 1928
- Built by: Fogerson, Wilburn E.
- Architect: Mark, Carl G.
- Architectural style: commercial block apartment
- MPS: Springfield MPS
- NRHP reference No.: 08001023
- Added to NRHP: October 29, 2008

Ambassador Apartments is a historic apartment building located at Springfield, Greene County, Missouri. It was built in 1928, and is a four-story Commercial Block apartment building with a flat roof, red brick walls and simple Tudor style stone accents. The building houses 33 studio and one bedroom apartments. Also on the property is a contributing small ceramic block garage built about 1933.

It was listed on the National Register of Historic Places in 2008.
