= Hotel Intourist Palace =

Hotel in Batumi, Georgia

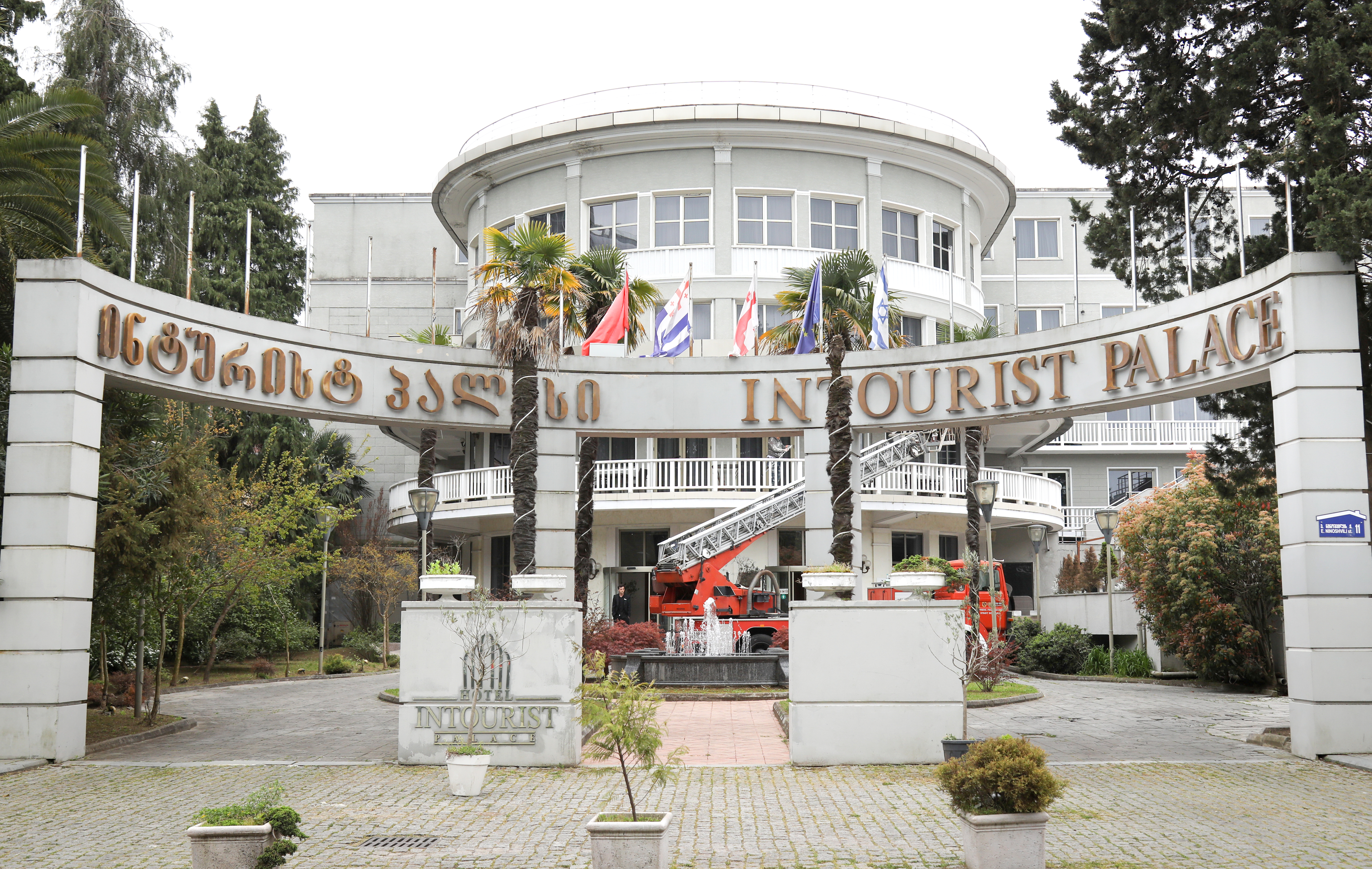
- Hotel entrance
- Interactive map of the Hotel Intourist Palace area

General information
- Location: Batumi, Georgia, Ninoshvili Boulevard, Batumi
- Coordinates: 41°39′09″N 41°38′07″E
- Opening: 1939

Other information
- Number of restaurants: 2

Website
- Official website

The Hotel Intourist Palace is a luxury hotel in Batumi, Georgia.

The hotel is located in the very centre of Batumi, on the seaside Ninoshvili boulevard on the Black Sea. Established in 1939, the hotel has since been an accommodation for over 450,000 foreign travellers, politician, diplomats, businessmen, and sportsmen. International conferences, symposiums and forums have also been held in the hotel.

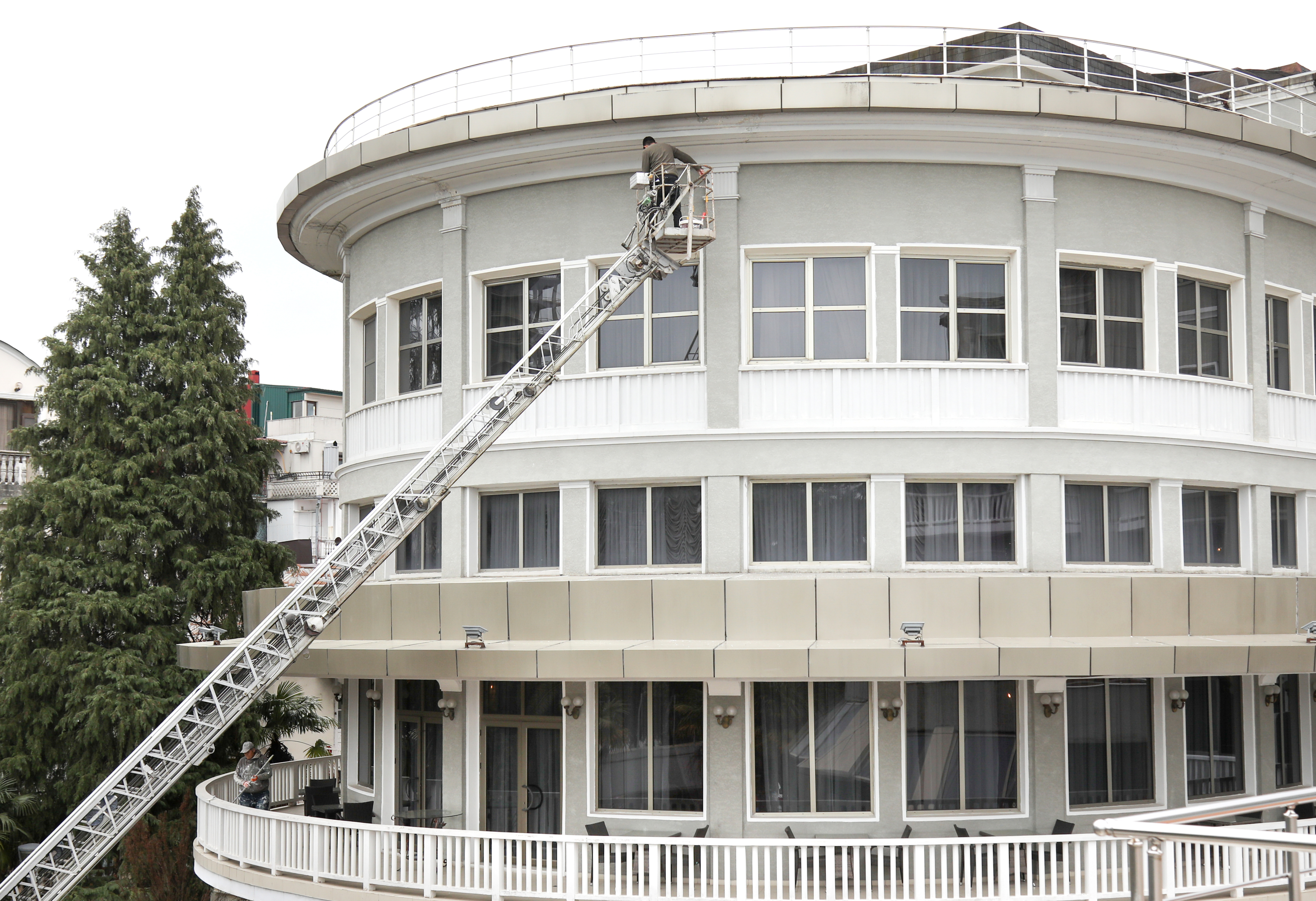
Intourist Palace 2023

The hotel has a notable casino, two restaurants, an open-air pool, an ATM in the lobby, a spa with sauna, Turkish bath, fitness centre and a range of massages.

== Gallery ==
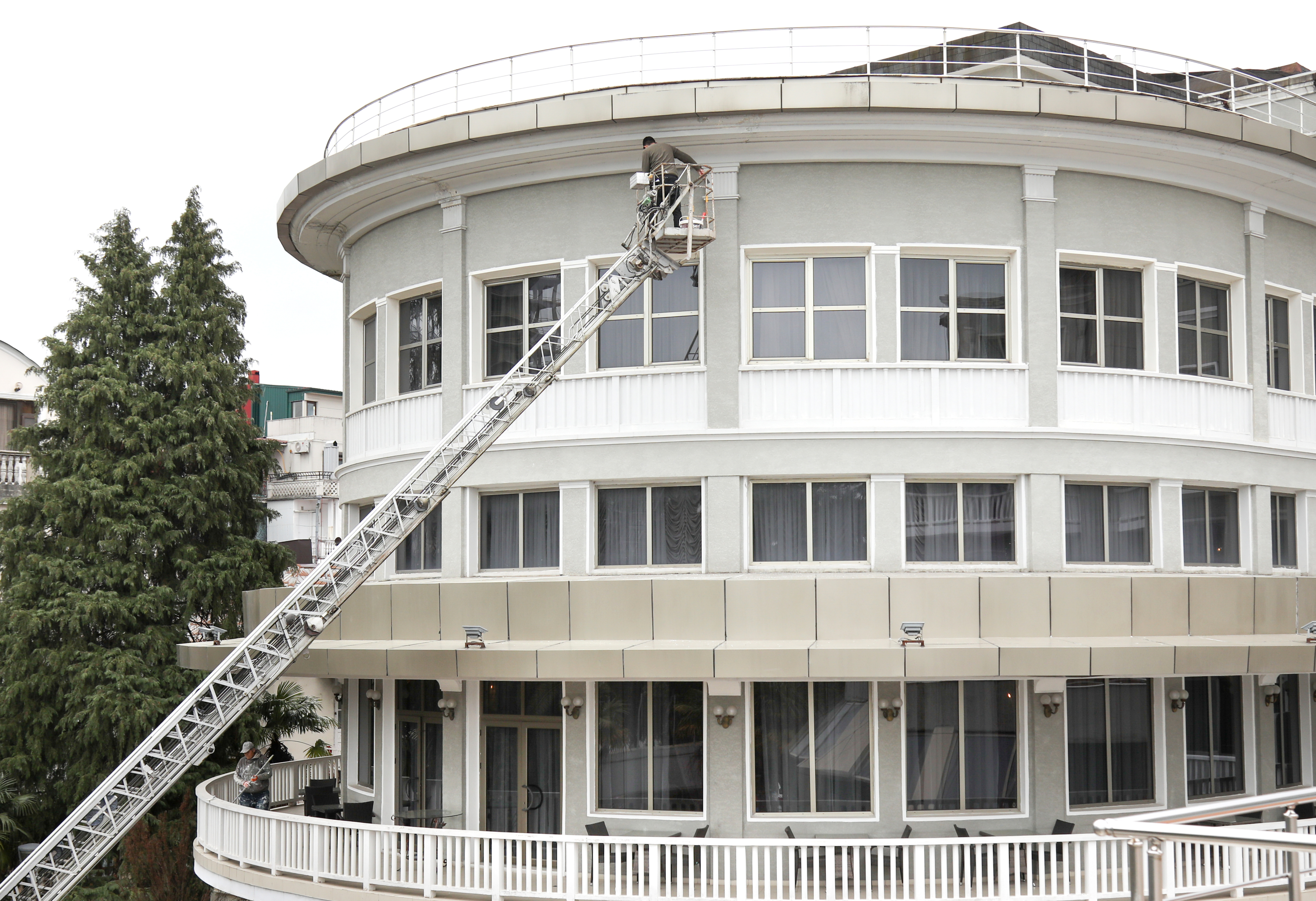

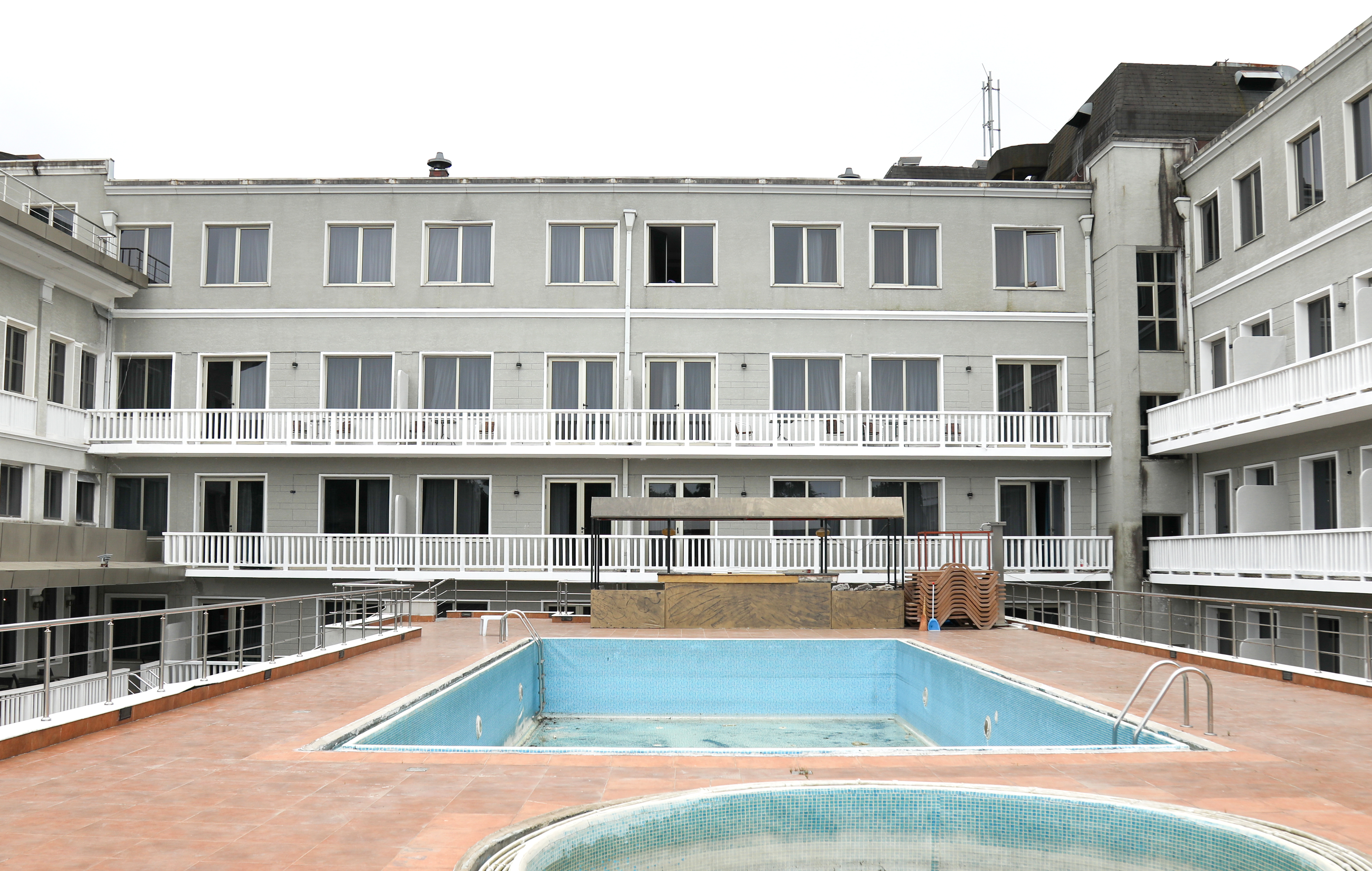

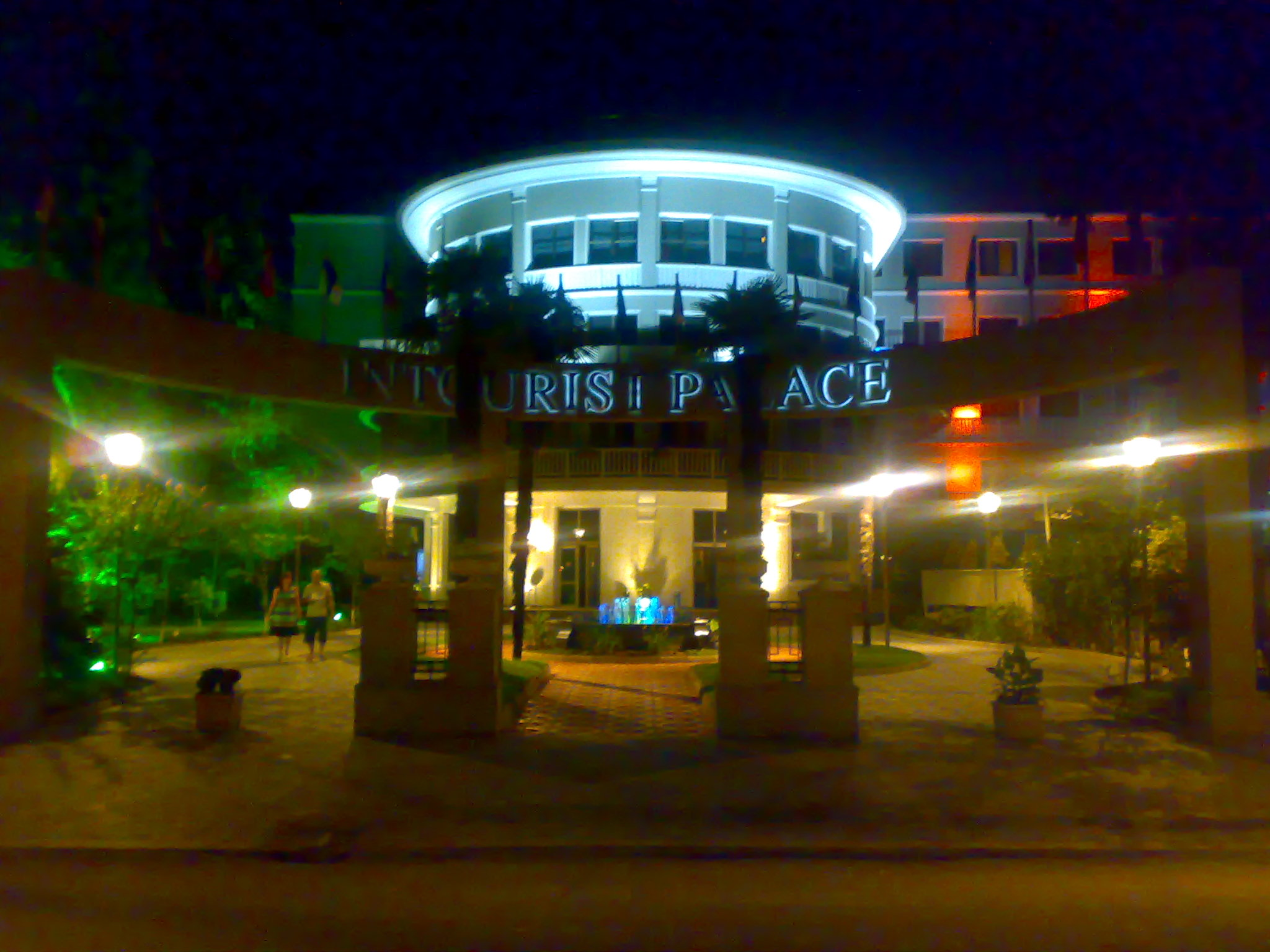

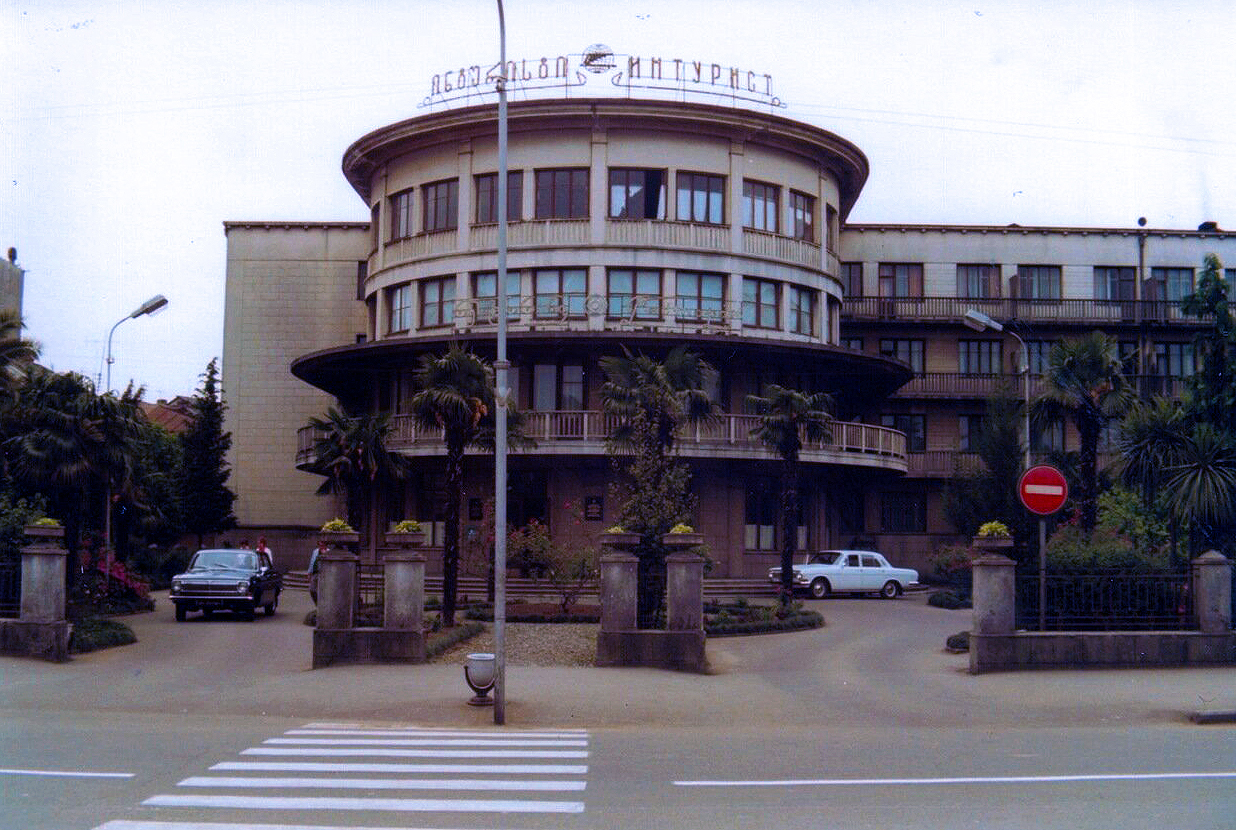
