= Yellow Cab Ambassador =

Vehicle

Ambassador was an American automobile produced by the Yellow Cab Company of Chicago, Illinois, between 1921 and 1925.

== History ==
Initially sold for use as a taxicab, the Model D-1 was introduced as a "drive-yourself" model in 1924.

Yellow Cab introduced the Ambassador in 1921 and explained that "this car was being made up to order". The Ambassador was available as a 4-passenger sport or 7-passenger touring for US$4,500, as well as a Berlin limousine or sedan for $6,500. All featured a 136-inch (3,454 mm) wheelbase and a special 6-cylinder Continental L-head engine.

In 1925 Yellow Cab was taken over by General Motors. John D. Hertz remained as president and the Ambassador D-1 model became the "Hertz". Apart from a larger engine in 1927, production continued with little change until 1928. Most were sedans, although other body styles were available.
