= Hotel Ambasadori =

General information
- Type: Hotel
- Location: Tbilisi, Georgia
- Coordinates: 41°41′46″N 44°48′24″E

The Hotel Ambasadori (ამბასადორი) is a luxury 5-star hotel in Tbilisi, Georgia. It is located in the heart of Tbilisi's historic center on the right bank of the Mtkvari River between the Anchiskhati Church and the Marionette Theatre near the commercial center of the city.

The hotel has served as a meeting place for many institutions, international political meetings and conferences.
