= Nankan New Town =

Taiwanese residential development

Coordinates: 25°03′14″N 121°17′43″E

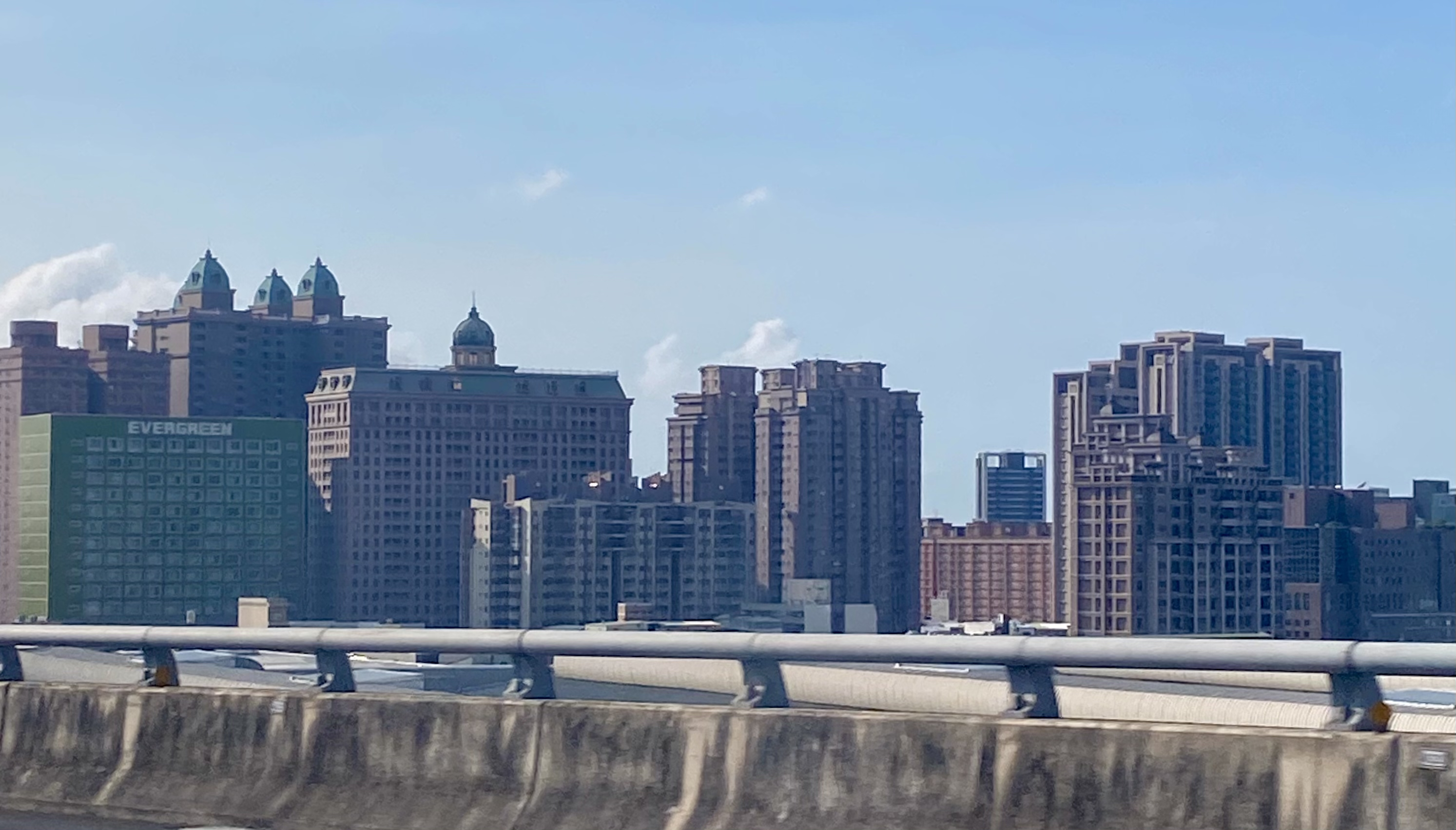
Skyline of Nankan New Town in 2020.

Nankan New Town (Chinese: 南崁新市鎮; pinyin: Nánkǎn xīn shìzhèn) is a large residential development located at the border of Luzhu District and Guishan District in Taoyuan, Taiwan. It was first proposed as a new town in the 1980s. The project aims to create a town using 32.4 km^{2} in central Luzhu and northeast Guishan to relocate people from the overcrowded Taipei metropolitan area in response to the emergence of various industries in the area west of Taipei city. The new town has convenient access to the National Freeway 1, which was completed in 1978, and Taoyuan International Airport, which opened in 1979. It currently has a population of about 100,000. Famous buildings in the new town includes EVA Air Headquarters and Gallery & Palace, which is the tallest building in the district.

== Developmental History ==
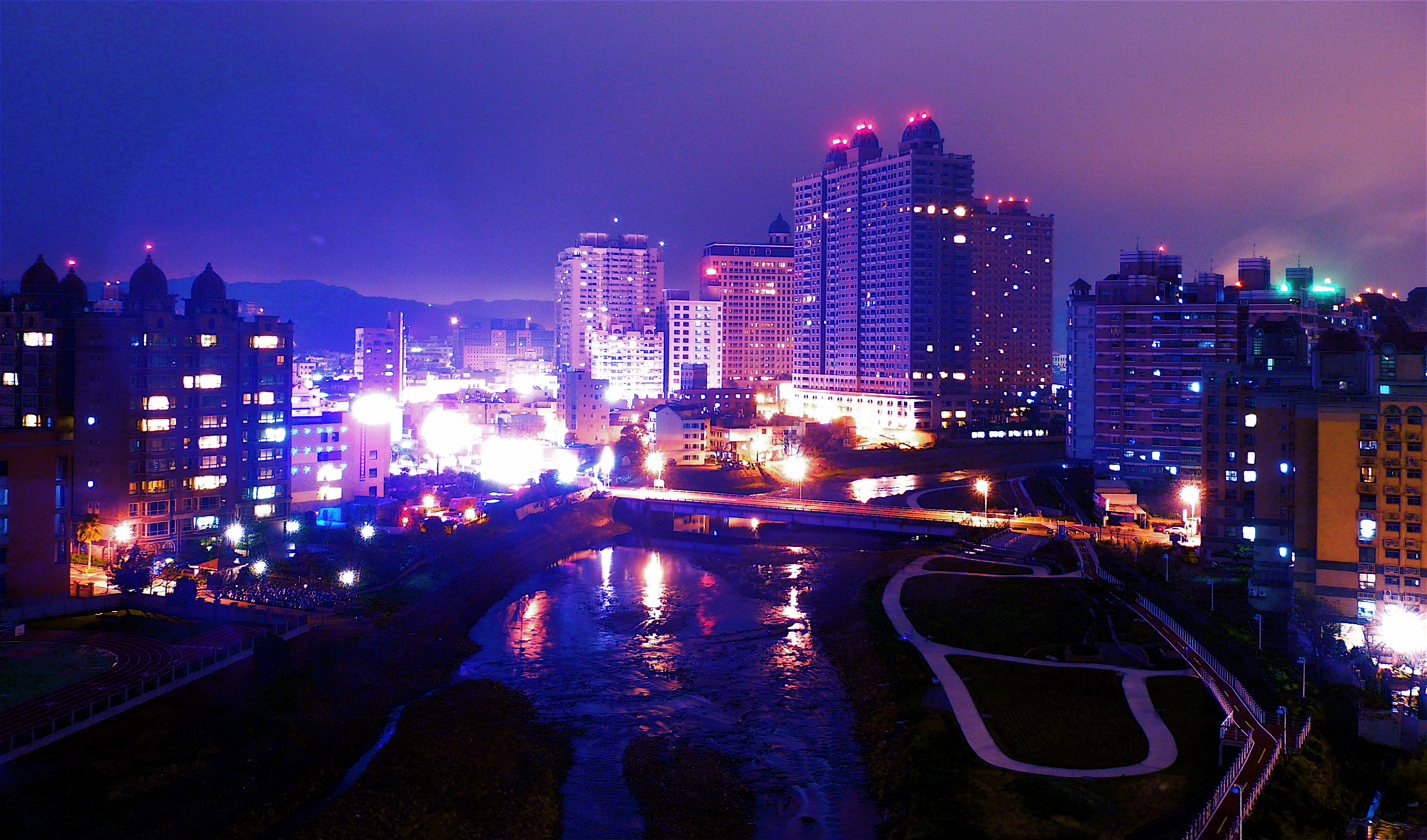
Nankan New Town in 2009

In the 1980s, the government undertook replotting and consolidation of the land in the new town, which was mostly farmland. This comes as a result of the official change in the land's designated usage from agricultural to residential, and from the construction of public facilities. The government utilizes land thus acquired to construct basic public facilities, such as roads, water, sewer, and power lines, and telecommunications systems, as well as greenbelts and parks. In the 1990s, due to convenient transportation to and from Taipei, rapid population growth and the proliferation of buildings took place even whilst the new town plans were still under planning.

== Transportation ==
=== Road ===
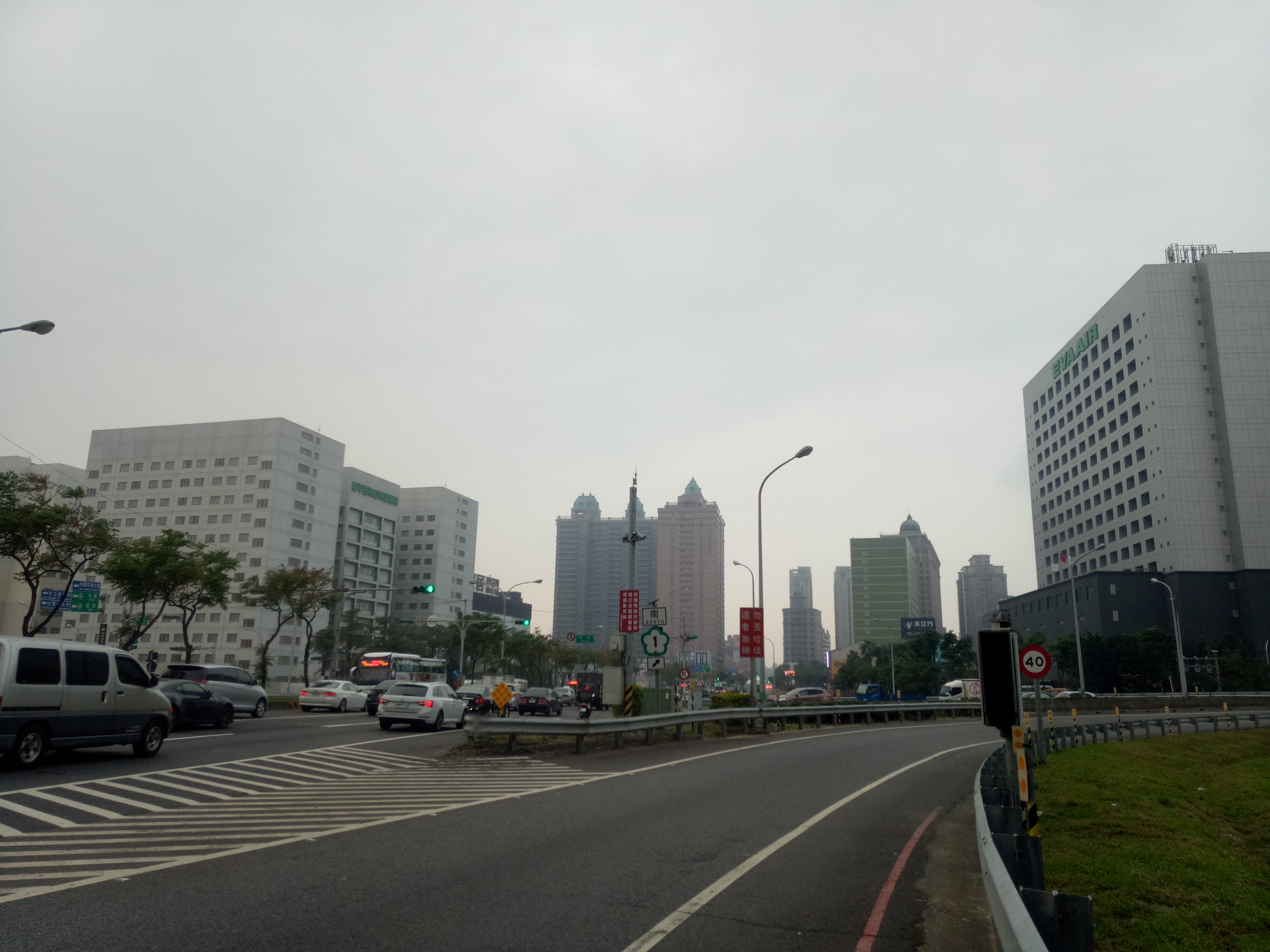
Exit of Taoyuan Interchange into Zhongzheng Road

The new town is situated near the Taoyuan Interchange on the National Freeway 1.

- Provincial Highways:
  - Provincial Highway 4
  - Provincial Highway 31

=== Rail ===
From 2005 to 2012, Nankan New Town was served by Nanxiang railway station of the Linkou line, which was closed on 28 December 2012 to make way for the construction of the Taoyuan Airport MRT. From 2017, the area is also served by two stations of the Taoyuan Metro: Shanbi metro station and Kengkou metro station. Future developments will see another three stations on the Green line being constructed in the area: Nankan Bus Station, Nanzhu Rd., and Luzhu Industrial Park.

== Amenities ==
=== Commercial facilities ===
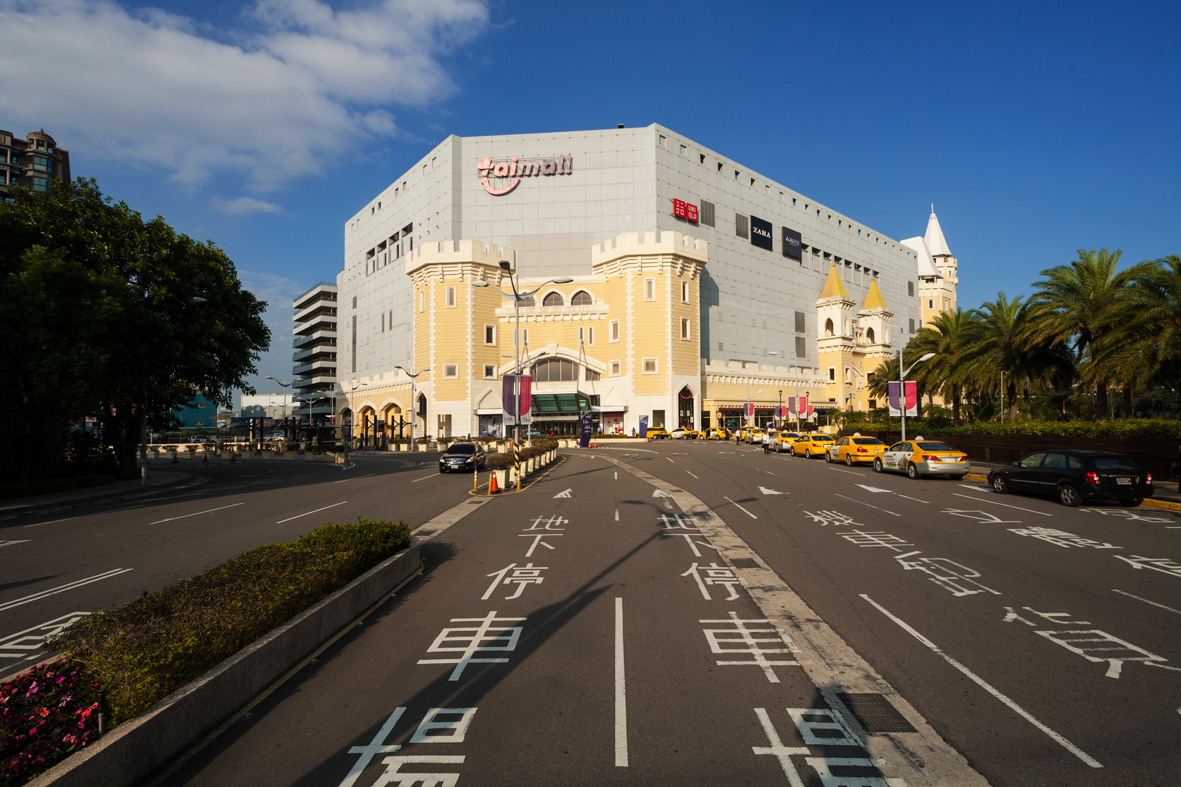
TaiMall Shopping Center

The new town depended on one neighborhood shopping mall: TaiMall, which opened on July 4, 1999, it covers an indoor area of 50,000 m^{2} (540,000 sq ft) and houses a cinema complex within the mall. Other commercial facilities include Carrefour Market Nan Chu Store, B&Q Nankan Store and Costco Nankan Store, as well as the various PX Mart branches.

=== Education ===
- Taoyuan Municipal Nankan Senior High School

=== Hotels ===
- Monarch Skyline Hotel

=== Parks and public facilities ===
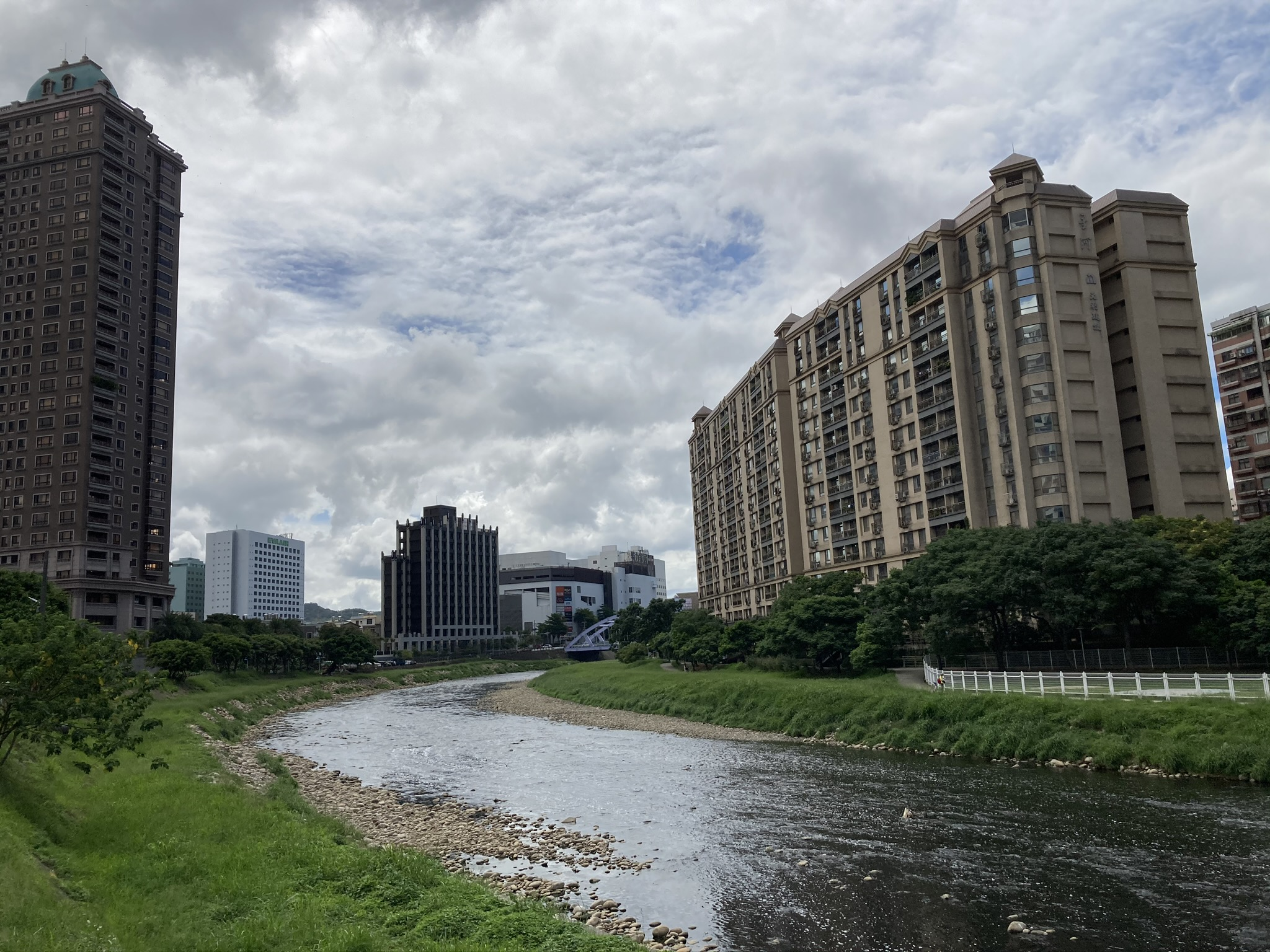
Nankan River

There are various parks and pedestrian paths along the Nankan River and Dakeng Creek, which run across the new town. Most of the important public administrative facilities of the district are also located in the new town, such as the Luzhu District Office and the Public Health Center.
