= Taoyuan Senior High School railway station =

Railway station in Taoyuan District, Taoyuan City, Taiwan

Taoyuan Senior High School Station 桃園高中車站
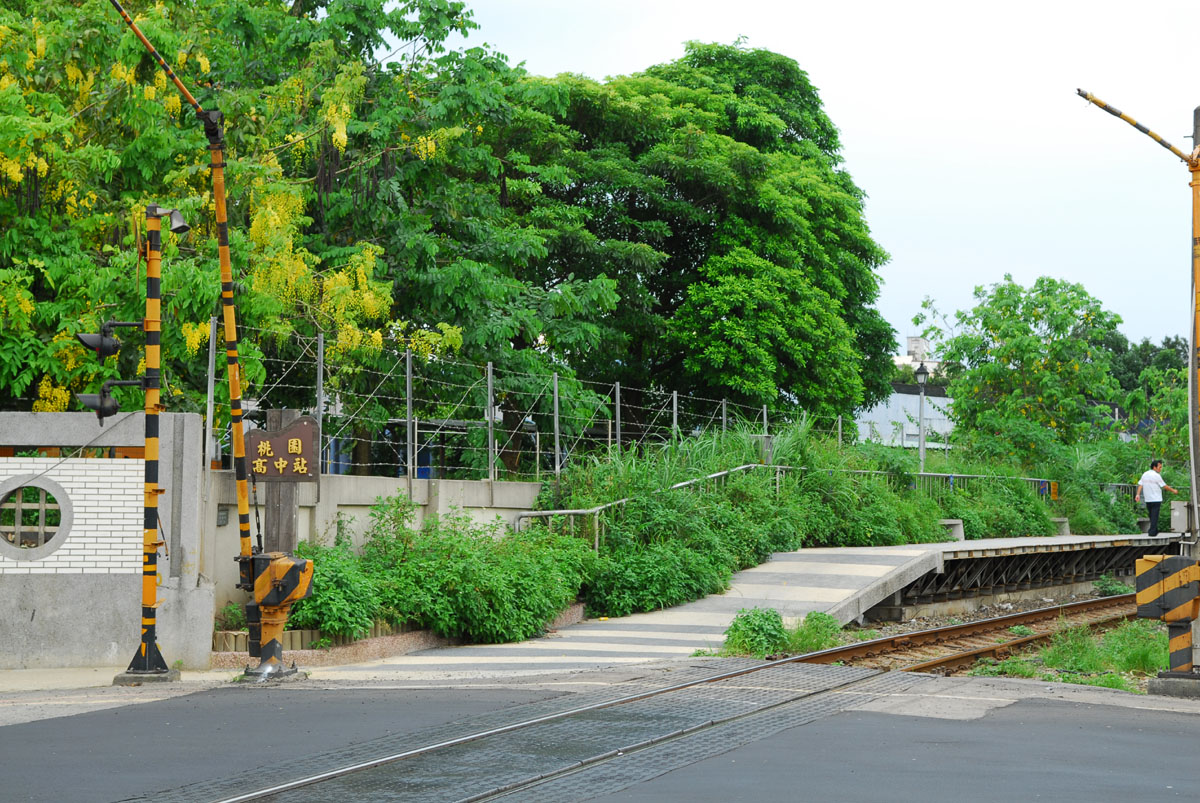

General information
- Location: Taoyuan District, Taoyuan City, Taiwan
- Coordinates: 24.998077°N 121.325687°E
- System: Train station
- Owner: Taiwan Railways Administration
- Operator: Taiwan Railways Administration
- Line: Linkou
- Train operators: Taiwan Railways Administration

History
- Opened: 28 October 2005
- Closed: 28 December 2012
Location

Taoyuan Senior High School (Chinese: 桃園高中車站; pinyin: Táoyuán Gāozhōng Chēzhàn) was a railway station on the Taiwan Railways Administration Linkou line located in Taoyuan City, Taoyuan County (present-day Taoyuan District, Taoyuan City), Taiwan.

== History ==
The train station was opened on 28 October 2005 and was closed on 28 December 2012.

== Nearby stations ==
Taiwan Railways Administration
Taoyuan <-- Linkou line --> Baoshan

== See also ==
- List of railway and metro stations in Taiwan
