= Nanxiang station =

Nanxiang station or Nanxiang railway station may refer to:

- Nanxiang station (Shanghai Metro) (Chinese: 南翔站; pinyin: Nánxiáng Zhàn), a metro station in Shanghai, China
- Nanxiang railway station (Shanghai) (Chinese: 南翔站; pinyin: Nánxiáng Zhàn), a railway station in Shanghai, China
- Nanshiang railway station (Taiwan) (Chinese: 南祥車站; pinyin: Nánxiáng Chēzhàn), a railway station in Taoyuan, Taiwan
