= Monarch Skyline Hotel =

Hotel in Luzhu, Taoyuan, Taiwan

- 尊爵天際大飯店
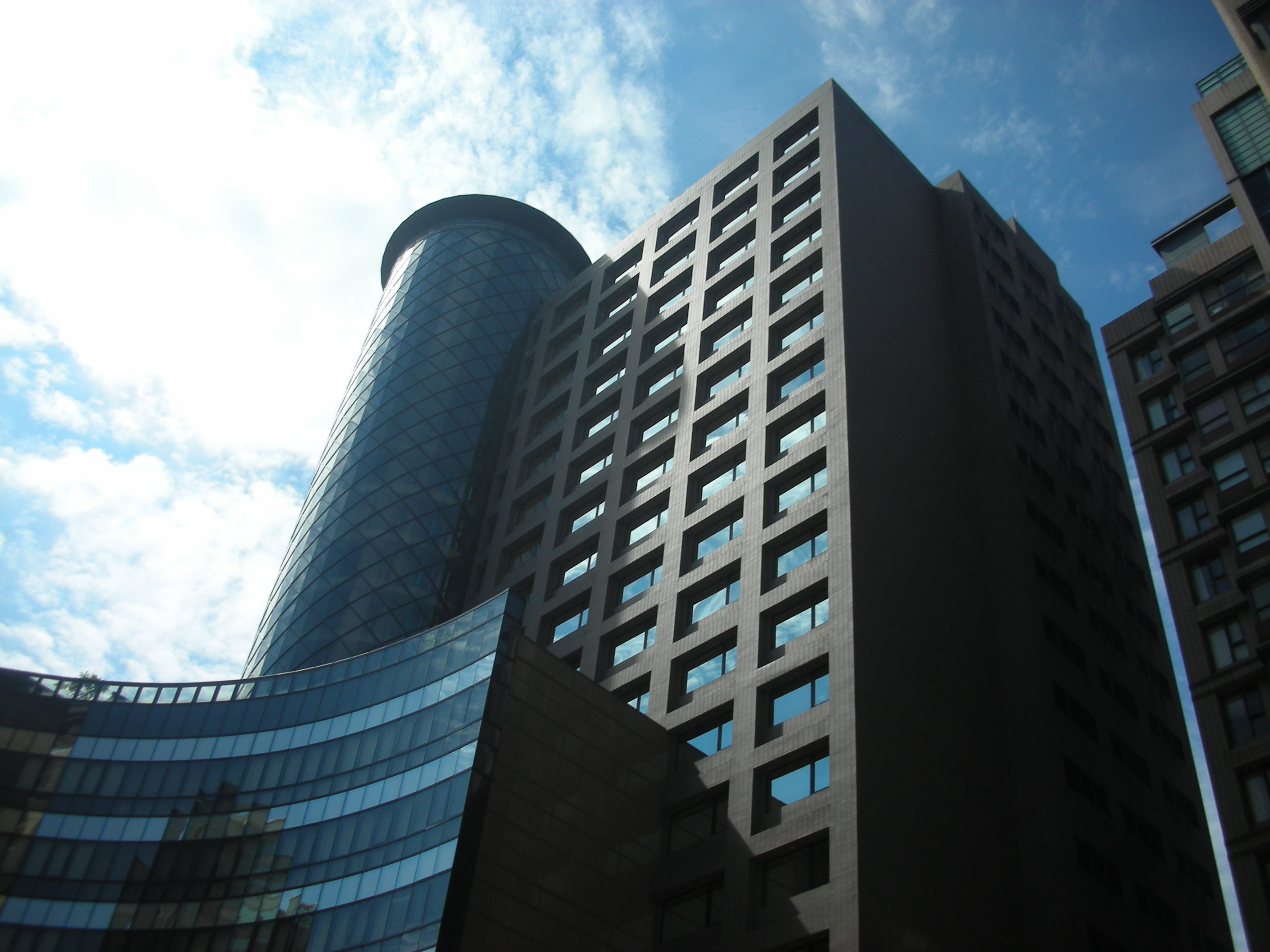
- Interactive map of the Monarch Skyline Hotel area

General information
- Status: Completed
- Type: hotel
- Location: No. 108, Section 1, Nankan Road, Luzhu District, Taoyuan, Taiwan
- Coordinates: 25.0521°N 121.2882°E
- Opening: 8 August 2008

Height
- Roof: 241 ft (73 m)

Technical details
- Floor count: 20

Other information
- Number of rooms: 250

Website
- Official website

Monarch Skyline Hotel (Chinese: 尊爵天際大飯店) is a hotel located in Nankan New Town, Luzhu District, Taoyuan City, Taiwan. Opened on 8 August 2008, the 20-storey, 241 ft (73 m) tall hotel has 250 rooms and suites and has facilities such as a business center, spa, lounge bar and gym.

== Restaurants and Bars ==
- Wing Japanese Kitchen: A Japanese restaurant offering sushi and other classic Japanese delicacies.
- Jiang-Zhe Kitchen: A Chinese restaurant located on the 3rd floor serving traditional Zhejiang cuisine and other Chinese delicacies.
- Sky Bar: Bar located on the ground floor serving coffee, juices, cocktails, and spirits.

== Transportation ==
The hotel is located around 15 minutes' drive from Taoyuan International Airport and around 4 km (2.5 mi) from Shanbi metro station on the Taoyuan Airport MRT line of the Taoyuan Metro.

== See also ==
- Novotel Taipei Taoyuan International Airport
- Sheraton Taoyuan Hotel
