= Sheraton Taoyuan Hotel =

Hotel in Dayuan, Taoyuan, Taiwan

- 桃園喜來登酒店
- Location within Taiwan

General information
- Status: Completed
- Type: Hotel
- Location: No. 777, Daguan Road, Dayuan District, Taoyuan City, Taiwan
- Coordinates: 25.0619°N 121.1757°E
- Opening: 22 September 2019

Other information
- Number of rooms: 190

Website
- Official website

The Sheraton Taoyuan Hotel (traditional Chinese: 桃園喜來登酒店; simplified Chinese: 桃园喜来登酒店; pinyin: Táoyuán Xǐláidēng Jiǔdiàn) is located in Dayuan District, Taoyuan City, Taiwan. It opened in 2010 as the Orchard Park Hotel and became a Sheraton on 22 September 2019. The hotel has 190 rooms and suites and has facilities such as a fitness center, indoor swimming pool, game room and gift shop. The hotel is a franchise of Sheraton Hotels and Resorts and is the fourth Sheraton hotel to open in Taiwan, after Sheraton Grand Taipei Hotel, Sheraton Hsinchu Hotel and Sheraton Taitung Hotel.

== Restaurants and Bars ==
- U Kitchen: An international buffet restaurant offering seafood dishes from a variety of cuisines.
- Hee Yuet Lau: A Cantonese restaurant serving traditional dim sum and other Chinese delicacies, such as Cantonese roasted meats, soup, shark fin soup, etc.
- Hanamizuki: A Japanese restaurant offering sushi and other classic Japanese delicacies.

== Transportation ==
The hotel is located around 10 minutes' drive from Taoyuan International Airport and 20 minutes from HSR Taoyuan Station.

== See also ==
- Sheraton Hotels and Resorts
- Sheraton Grand Taipei Hotel
- Sheraton Hsinchu Hotel
- Sheraton Taitung Hotel
- Monarch Skyline Hotel
