= Baoshan railway station (Taiwan) =

Railway station in Taoyuan City, Taiwan

Baoshan 寶山
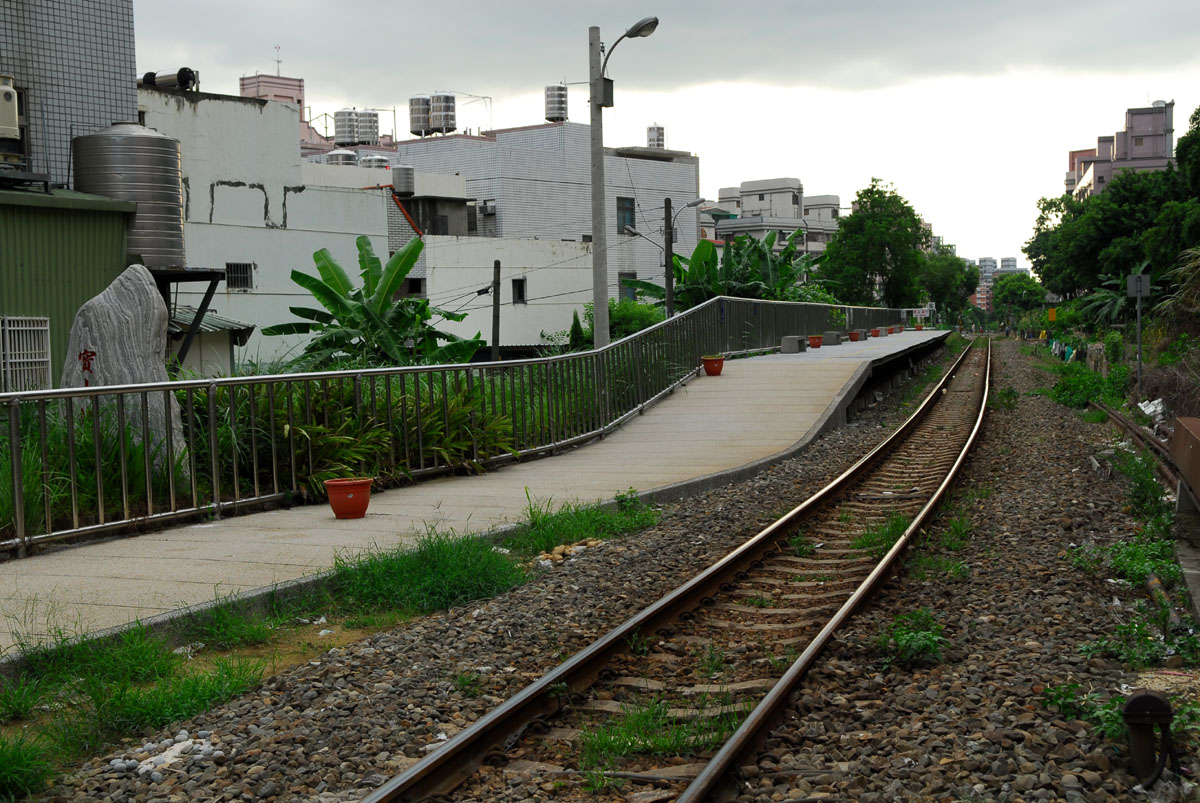

General information
- Location: Taoyuan District, Taoyuan City, Taiwan
- Coordinates: 25.012497°N 121.317363°E
- Line: Linkou line

History
- Opened: 28 November 2005
- Closed: 28 December 2012
Location

Baoshan (traditional Chinese: 寶山車站; simplified Chinese: 宝山车站; pinyin: Bǎoshān Chēzhàn) was a railway station on the Taiwan Railways Administration (TRA) Linkou line located in Taoyuan District, Taoyuan City, Taiwan.

== History ==
The station was opened for operation on 28 November 2005 but its operation was suspended on 28 December 2012.

== Nearby stations ==
Taiwan Railways Administration
Taoyuan Senior High School <-- Linkou line --> Nanxiang

== See also ==
- List of railway stations in Taiwan
