= Sheraton Taitung Hotel =

Hotel in Taitung City, Taitung County, Taiwan

- 台東桂田喜來登酒店
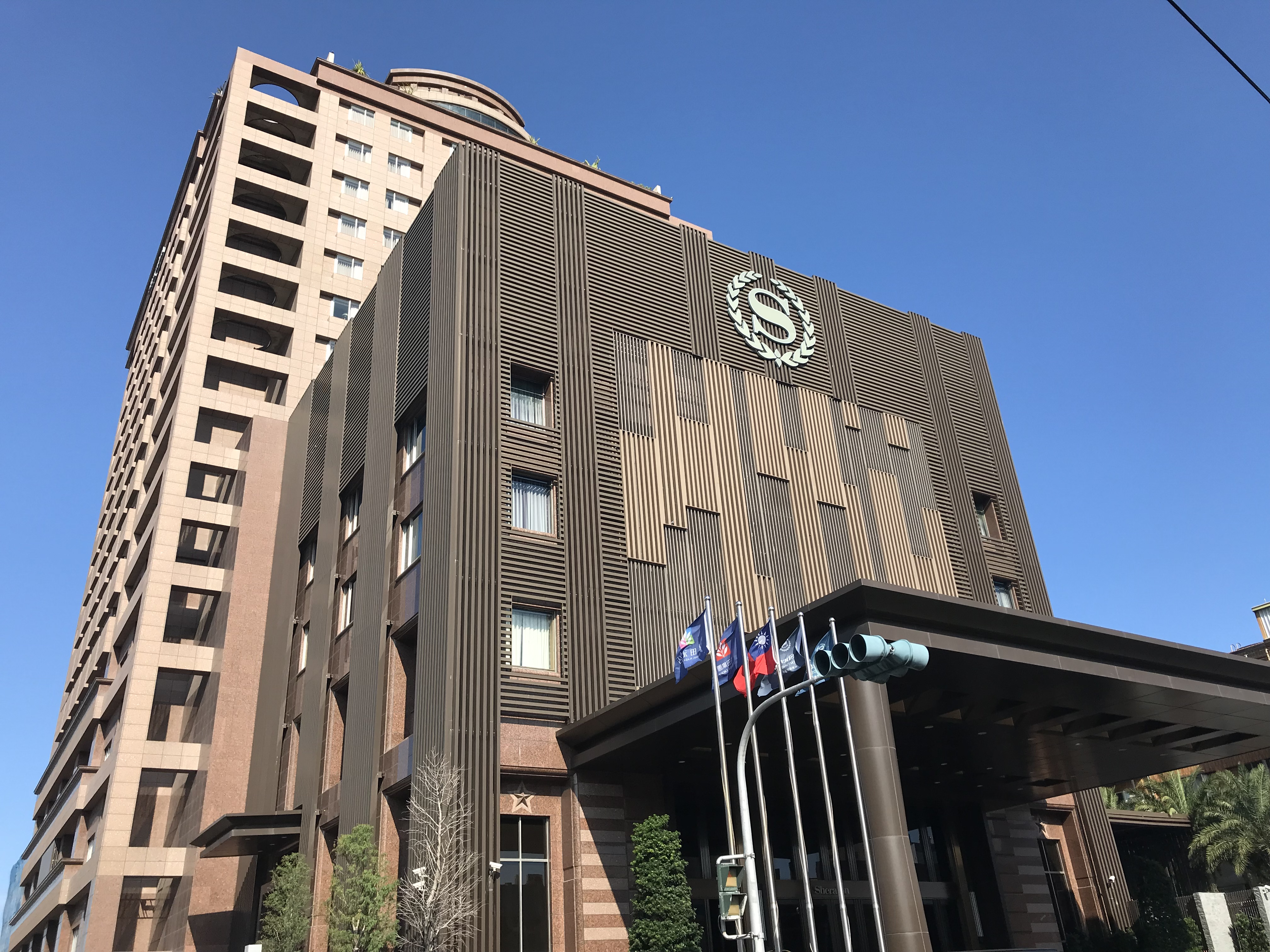

- Location within Taiwan

General information
- Status: Completed
- Type: hotel
- Location: No.316, Zhengqi Road, Taitung City, Taitung County, Taiwan
- Coordinates: 22°45′19.9″N 121°08′55.2″E
- Completed: 2014
- Opening: May 2015

Technical details
- Floor count: 19
- Floor area: 28,075 m^{2} (302,200 sq ft)

Other information
- Number of rooms: 290

Website
- Official website

Sheraton Taitung Hotel (traditional Chinese: 台東桂田喜來登酒店; simplified Chinese: 台东桂田喜来登酒店; pinyin: Táidōng Guìtián Xǐláidēng Jiǔdiàn) is located in Taitung City, Taitung County, Taiwan. Formerly the Queena Plaza Hotel, it was renovated and reopened as a Sheraton in May 2015. The 19-storey, 211 ft (64 m) hotel has 290 rooms and suites and has facilities such as a fitness center, swimming pool, multipurpose entertainment room and sauna. The hotel is the tallest building in Taitung. It is a franchise of Sheraton Hotels and Resorts and is the third Sheraton hotel in Taiwan, after Sheraton Grand Taipei Hotel and Sheraton Hsinchu Hotel.

== Restaurants and Bars ==
- AliHi Buffet: A buffet restaurant offering seafood dishes from a variety of cuisines.
- HOYEA: A Cantonese restaurant located on the 2nd floor serving traditional dim sum and other Chinese delicacies.
- Moon Bar: Bar located on the 8th floor serving whiskey and cocktails.
- BAR16 Bakery: A pastry shop on the ground floor offering a variety of breads, cakes, pastries and desserts.

== Transportation ==
The hotel is located around 15 minutes' drive from Taitung railway station and 20 minutes from Taitung Airport.

== See also ==
- Sheraton Hotels and Resorts
- Sheraton Grand Taipei Hotel
- Sheraton Hsinchu Hotel
- Sheraton Taoyuan Hotel
