= Fengming railway station =

Railway station in New Taipei, Taiwan

Fengming 鳳鳴
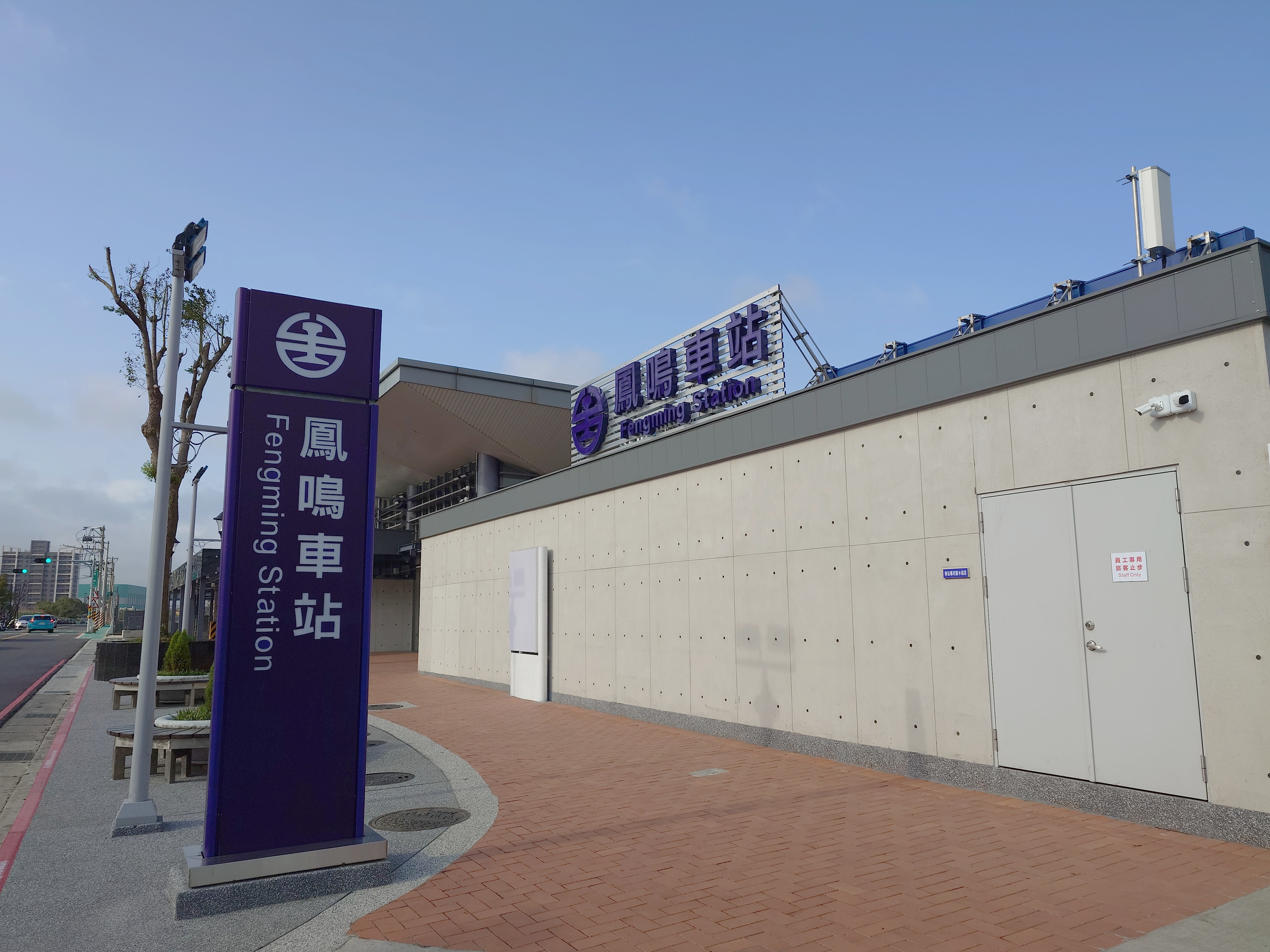
- Station building

Chinese name
- Traditional Chinese: 鳳鳴
Transcriptions
Standard Mandarin
- Bopomofo: ㄈㄥˋ ㄇㄧㄥˊ

General information
- Location: 2 Fengyi Road (鳳一路); Yingge District, New Taipei; Taiwan
- Coordinates: 24°58′20.9″N 121°20′12.4″E
- System: Taiwan Railway
- Operator: Taiwan Railway Corporation
- Line: Western Trunk line
- Distance: 54.2 km to Keelung
- Platforms: 2 (2 side platforms)
- Tracks: 2

Construction
- Structure type: At-grade

Other information
- Station code: 1075
- Website: tip.railway.gov.tw/tra-tip-web/tip/tip00H/tipH41/viewStaInfo/1075

History
- Opened: 30 November 2024

Passengers
- 2024: 3,317 per day
- Rank: 72

Services
Preceding station	Taiwan Railway	Following station
Yingge towards Keelung	Western Trunk line	Taoyuan towards Kaohsiung
Location

Fengming (Chinese: 鳳鳴) is a railway station in New Taipei, Taiwan served by Taiwan Railway. As part of the Taoyuan metropolitan railway undergrounding project, the station was opened on 30 November 2024.

== Description ==
This station was proposed as a part of the undergrounding and commuterization project of the Taoyuan section of Western Trunk line. It is the first station to be opened among the new stations in this project, and also the only one not located in Taoyuan City.

The station opened in 2024 is a temporary station. It is an at-grade station with two side platforms and two tracks, and there are no passing tracks for trains to overtake.

The permanent station will be an underground station, planned to have one island platform and one side platform.

Only local trains will stop here.

== See also ==
- List of railway stations in Taiwan
