= Taoyuan City Stadium =

Multi-use stadium in Taoyuan District, Taoyuan City, Taiwan

Coordinates: 24.993606°N 121.323788°E

- 桃園市立體育場
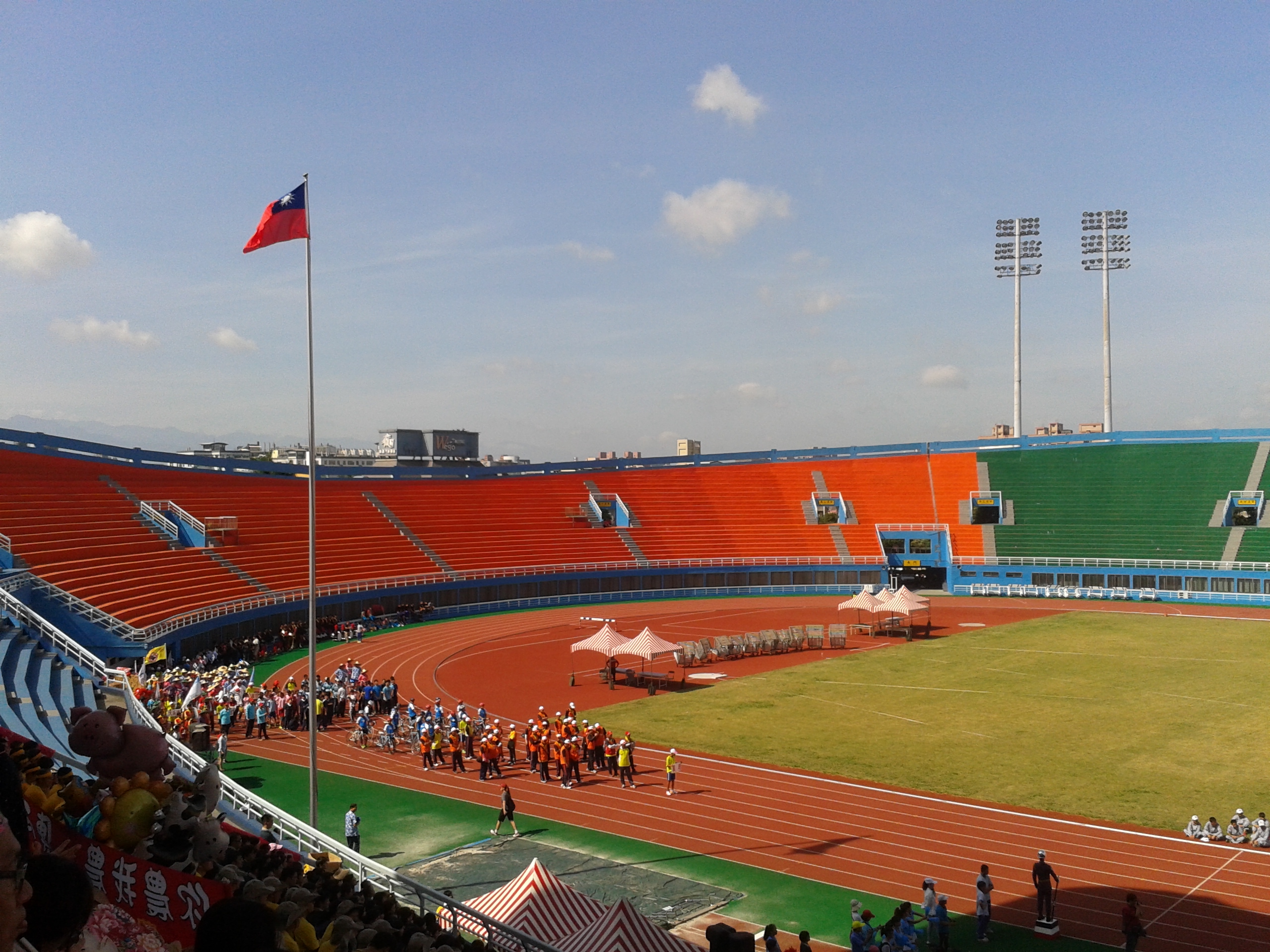

- Taiwan
- Location: Taoyuan District, Taoyuan City, Taiwan
- Capacity: 30,000
- Type: Stadium

Construction
- Opened: 1993

The Taoyuan City Stadium (Chinese: 桃園市立體育場; pinyin: Táoyuán Shìlì Tǐyùchǎng) is a multi-use stadium in Taoyuan District, Taoyuan City, Taiwan. It is currently used mostly for football matches and it also has an athletics track. The stadium has a capacity of 30,000 people.

== History ==
The stadium was originally built in 1993 as Taoyuan County Stadium (Chinese: 桃園縣立體育場; pinyin: Táoyuán Xiàn Lì Tǐyùchǎng). In 2014, it was changed to Taoyuan City Stadium.

== Transportation ==
The stadium is accessible within walking distance east of Taoyuan Station of Taiwan Railway.

== See also ==
- List of stadiums in Taiwan
