= Sheraton Hsinchu Hotel =

Luxury hotel located in Zhubei City, Hsinchu County, Taiwan

- 新竹豐邑喜來登大飯店
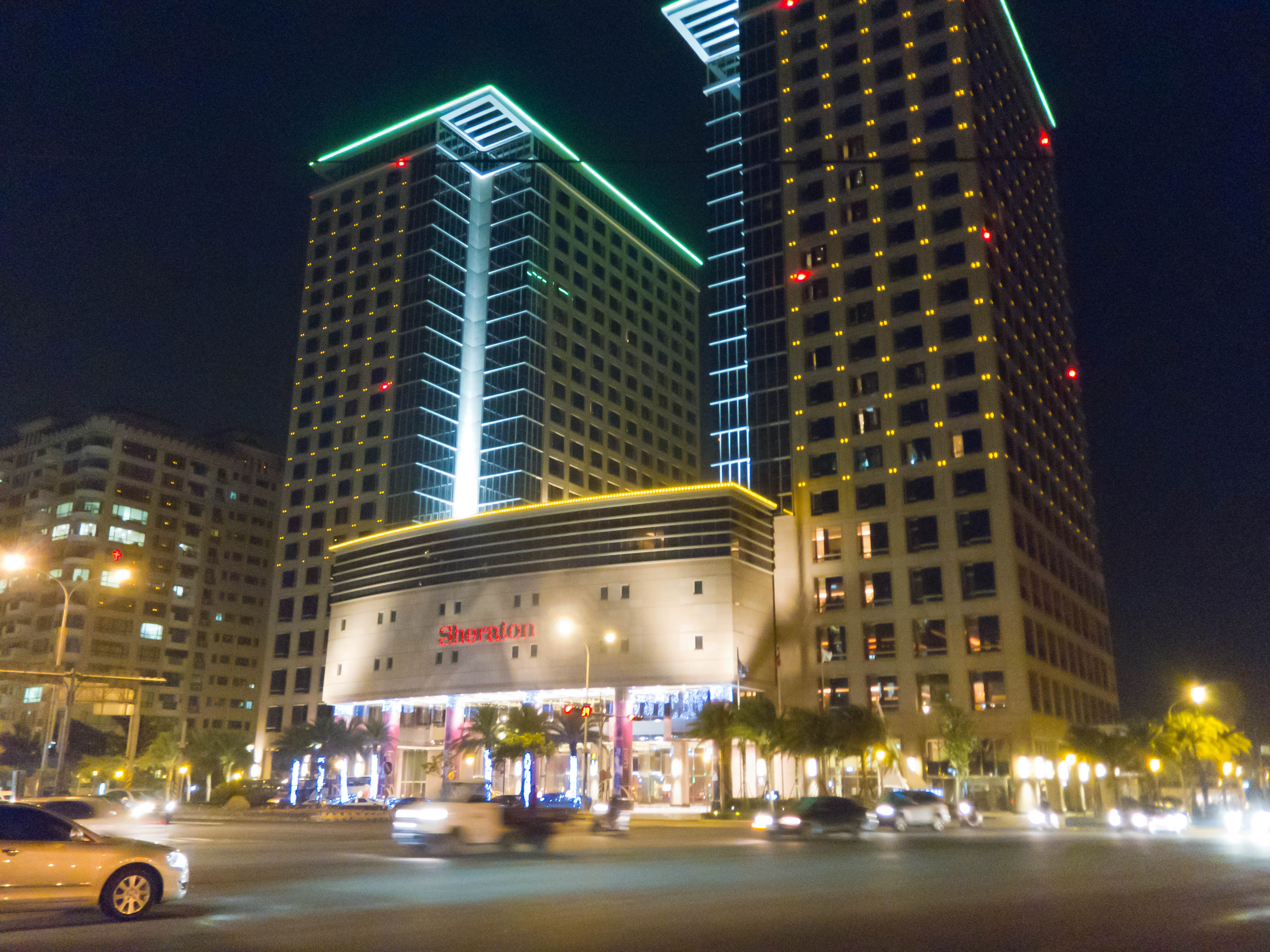

- Location within Taiwan

General information
- Status: Completed
- Type: Hotel
- Location: No.265, Dong Sec. 1, Guangming 6th Road, Zhubei City, Hsinchu County, Taiwan
- Coordinates: 24.8211°N 121.0281°E
- Completed: 2009
- Opening: 3 April 2010
- Owner: Fong Yi Construction Co

Technical details
- Floor count: 22
- Floor area: 127,285 m^{2} (1,370,080 sq ft)

Design and construction
- Developer: Fong Yi Construction Co

Other information
- Number of rooms: 386

Website
- Official website

Sheraton Hsinchu Hotel (traditional Chinese: 新竹豐邑喜來登大飯店; simplified Chinese: 新竹丰邑喜来登大饭店; pinyin: Xīnzhú Fēngyì Xǐláidēng Dà Fàndiàn) is located in Zhubei City, Hsinchu County, Taiwan. Opened on 3 April 2010, the hotel has 386 rooms and suites and has facilities such as a business center, fitness center, temperature controlled swimming pool and sauna. It is a franchise of Sheraton Hotels and Resorts.

== Restaurants and Bars ==
- Yue: A Cantonese restaurant located on the 4th floor serving traditional dim sum and other Chinese dishes.
- Moon: A Japanese restaurant located on the 2nd floor.
- Feast: A buffet restaurant with Halal certification serving a variety of dishes from all around the world. Halal orders are taken by request 48 hours before.
- Kanpai Classic: A Japanese barbecue restaurant on the 2nd floor.
- Light Bar: Bar serving whiskey and cocktails.
- Lobby Lounge: Located on the ground floor, the lounge serves craft beer and afternoon tea.
- Fresh Corner: A pastry shop offering a variety of breads, cakes, pastries and desserts.

== Public transportation ==
The hotel is located around 25 minutes' walk or 10 minute drive from Hsinchu HSR station.

== Gallery ==
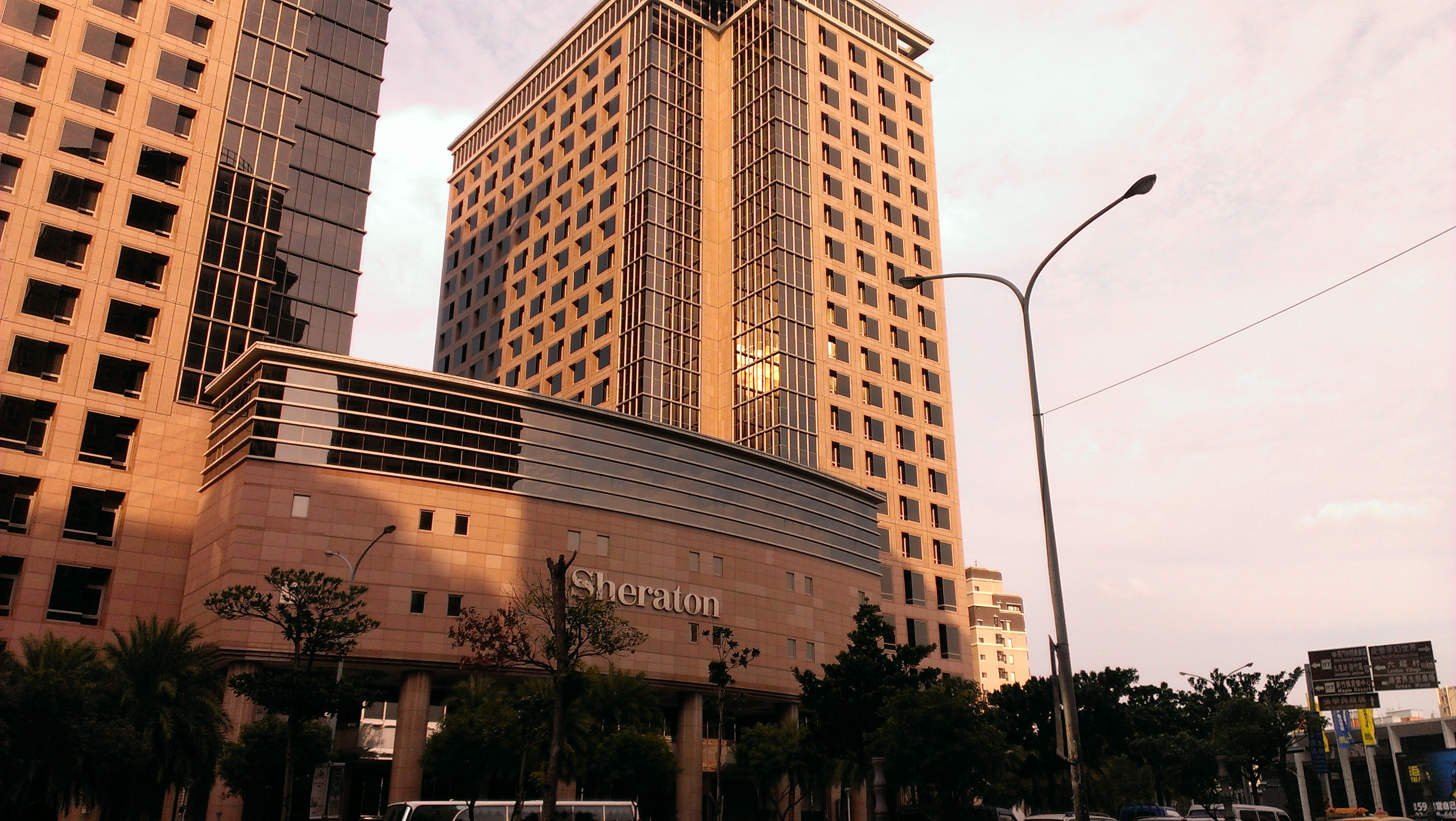
Entrance

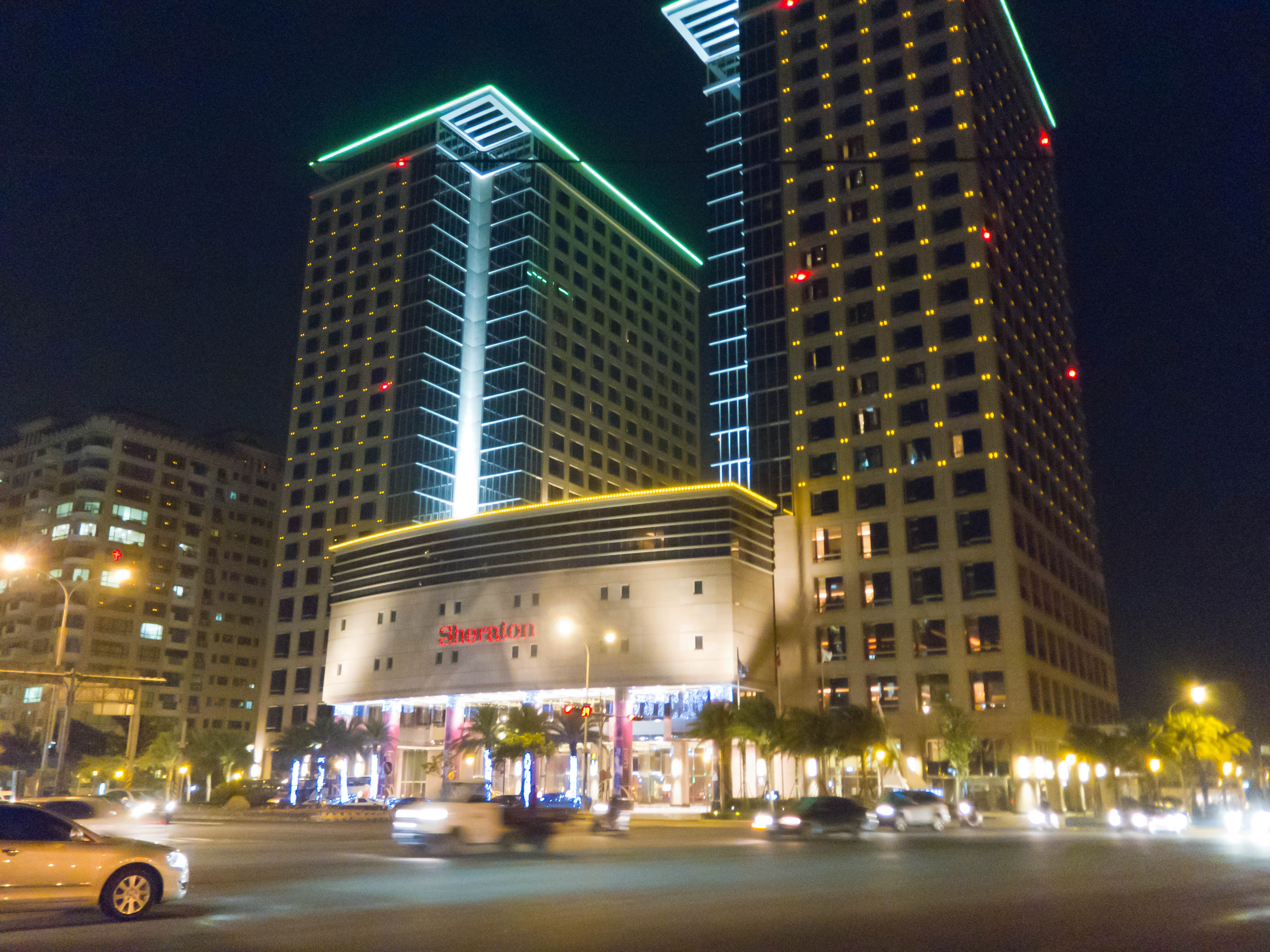
At night

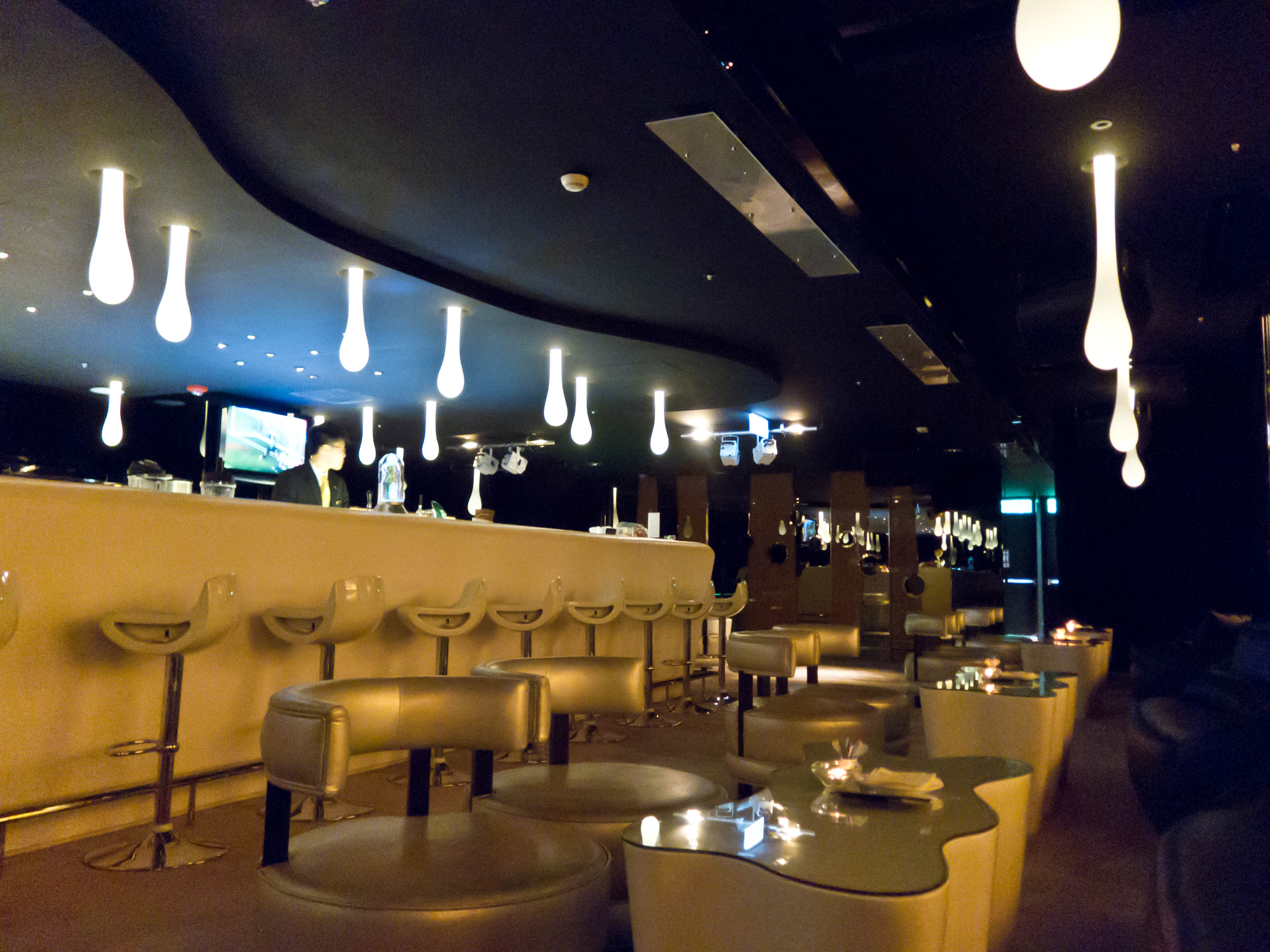
Light Bar

== See also ==
- Ambassador Hotel Hsinchu
- Sheraton Hotels and Resorts
- Sheraton Grand Taipei Hotel
- Sheraton Taitung Hotel
- Sheraton Taoyuan Hotel
