= Sheraton Grand Taipei Hotel =

Luxury hotel in Zhongzheng, Taipei, Taiwan

- 台北喜來登大飯店
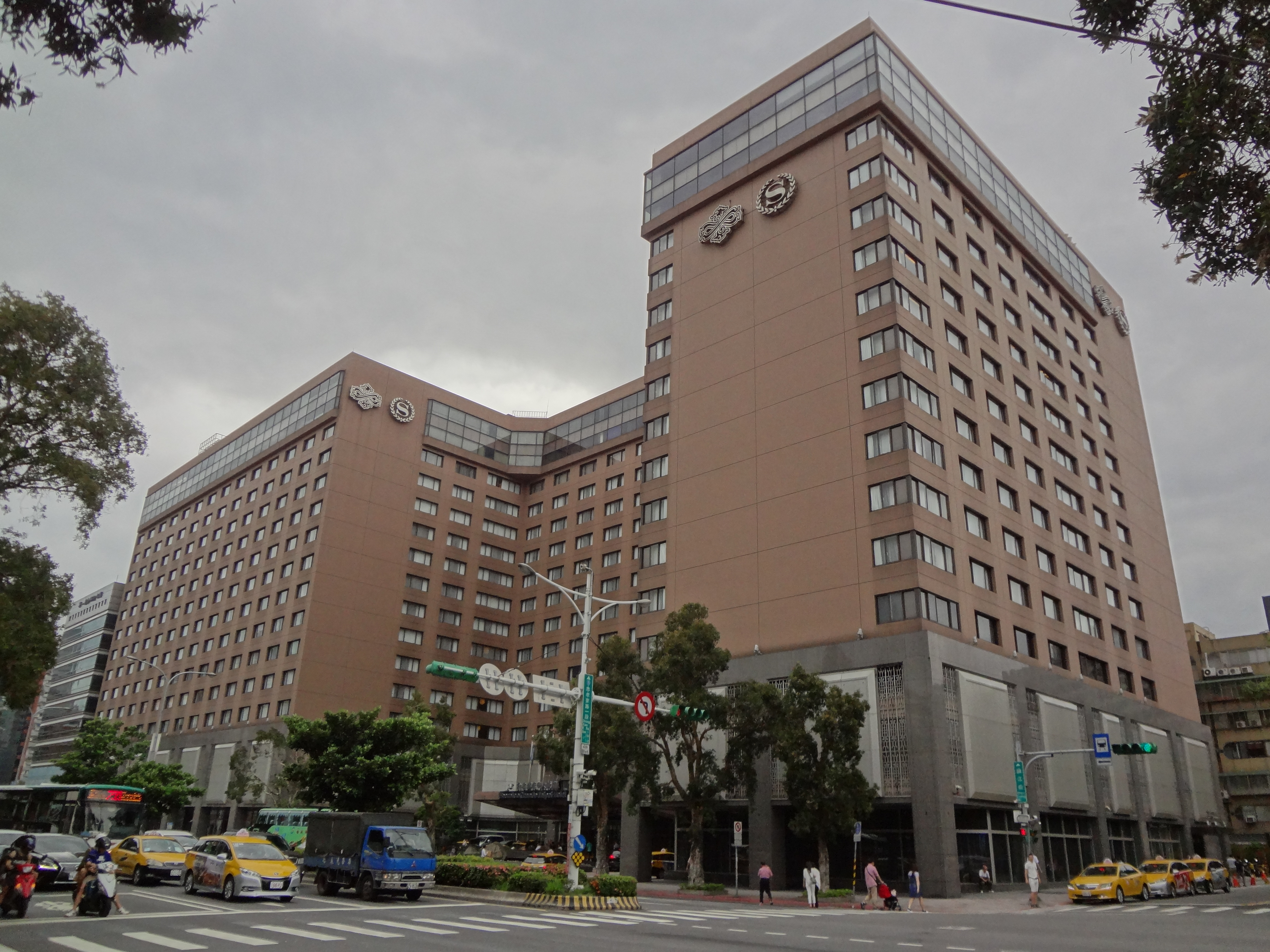

- Location within Taiwan

General information
- Status: Completed
- Type: Hotel
- Location: No. 12, Section 1, Zhongxiao East Road, Zhongzheng District, Taipei, Taiwan
- Coordinates: 25.044669°N 121.522549°E
- Groundbreaking: 3 November 1978
- Completed: 10 October 1980
- Opening: 24 March 1981

Technical details
- Floor count: 16

Other information
- Number of rooms: 688

Website
- www.sheratongrandtaipei.com

The Sheraton Grand Taipei Hotel (traditional Chinese: 台北喜來登大飯店; simplified Chinese: 台北喜来登大饭店; pinyin: Táiběi Xǐláidēng Dà Fàndiàn) is a 16-storey, 64 m (210 ft) tall hotel located in Zhongzheng District, Taipei, Taiwan.

== History ==
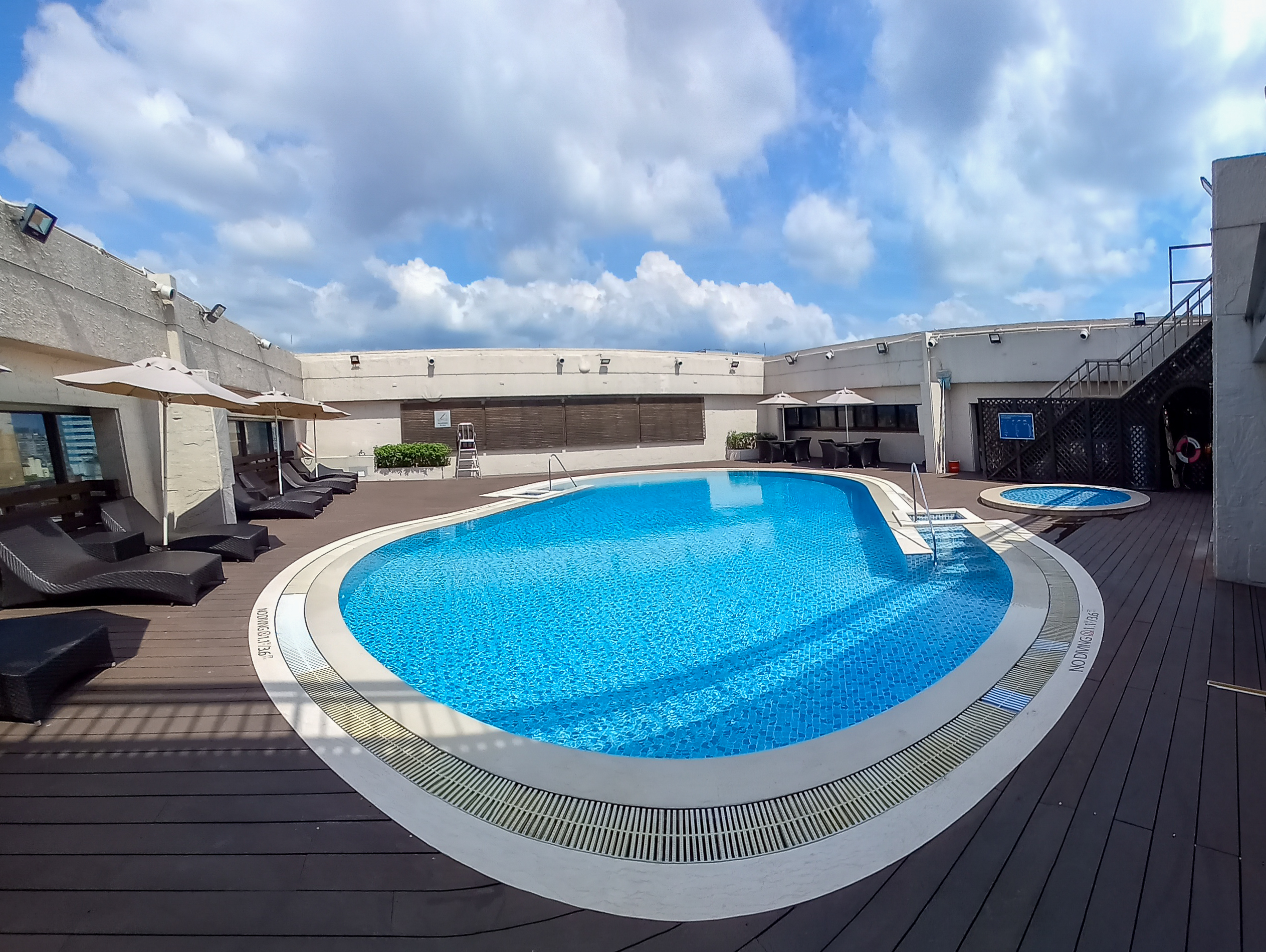
The outdoor swimming pool of the Spa areaof the Sheraton Grand Taipei Hotel.jpg

The Lai Lai Shangri-La Hotel (Chinese: 來來大飯店) opened on 24 March 1981. Sheraton Hotels and Resorts assumed management of the hotel in 1983, and it was renamed the Lai Lai Sheraton Hotel Taipei. It was the first Sheraton hotel in Taiwan. It was renamed the Sheraton Grand Taipei Hotel on 1 July 2002. The hotel underwent a general refurbishment in 2005 and now has 688 rooms and suites, 8 restaurants and provides facilities including a business center, fitness center, outdoor swimming pool and spa.

== Restaurants and bars ==
- Sukhothai: A Thai restaurant offering traditional Thai cuisine.
- The Lounge: Pub serving wine, light dining and afternoon tea.
- Kitchen 12: An international buffet and open restaurant serving a variety of dishes from all around the world.
- The Guest House: A Chinese restaurant providing traditional Szechuan and Yangzhou cuisine.
- The Dragon: A Cantonese restaurant serving dim sum and other Chinese delicacies.
- Pizza Pub: An Italian restaurant offering pizzas baked onsite. It is the first restaurant in Taiwan to be certified by the Italian Associazione Verace Pizzaiuoli Napoletani.
- Momoyama: A Japanese restaurant offering sushi and other classic Japanese delicacies.
- Antoine Room: A steakhouse offering premium steak with a comprehensive collection of wine.

== Public transportation ==
The hotel is located around 14 minutes' walk or five minutes' drive from Taipei Main Station. The nearest metro station is Shandao Temple metro station on the Bannan line of Taipei Metro.

== See also ==
- Sheraton Hsinchu Hotel
- Sheraton Taitung Hotel
- Sheraton Taoyuan Hotel
