= Linkou line =

Former Taiwanese railway

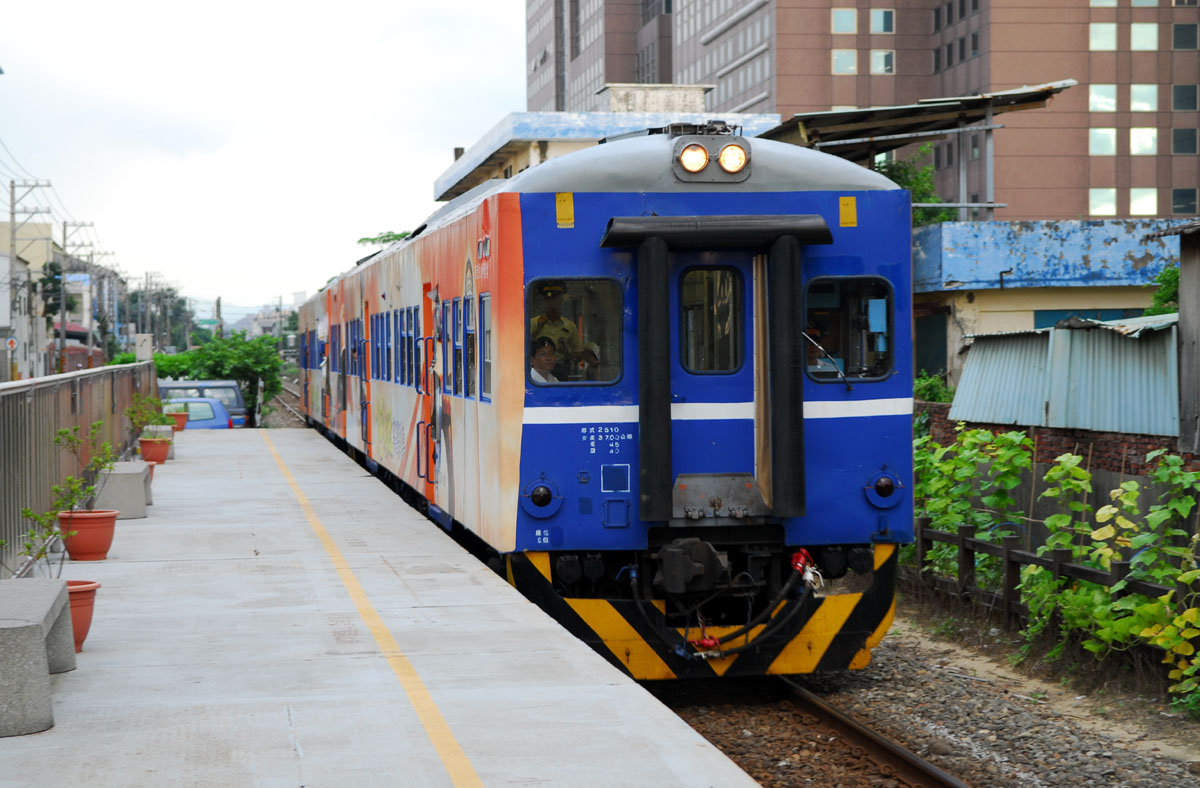

Overview
- Native name: 林口線
- Owner: Taiwan Railways Administration
- Termini: Taoyuan; Linkou (Linkou Power Plant)
- Stations: 9

Service
- Type: Passenger/freight rail
- Operator(s): Taiwan Railways Administration

History
- Opened: January 1, 1968
- Closed: December 28, 2012 (passenger); December 31, 2012 (freight)

Technical
- Line length: 18.4 km (11.4 mi)
- Number of tracks: 1
- Track gauge: 3 ft 6 in (1,067 mm)
- Electrification: None

The Linkou line (Chinese: 林口線; pinyin: Línkǒu Xiàn; Pe̍h-ōe-jī: Nâ-kháu Soàⁿ) was a railway branch line in Taiwan operated by the Taiwan Railways Administration. It was located in Taoyuan County (Note: Present-day Taoyuan City) and New Taipei City. The Linkou line suspended operations in December 2012.

== History ==
The railroad was originally built to transport coal to the Linkou Power Plant and was opened on January 1, 1968. Owing to the traffic policy of Taoyuan County, the local government made this line available for passenger service on October 27, 2005.

Passenger service on the Linkou line ended on December 28, 2012, followed by freight services on December 31, 2012, due to the grade-separation of the northern section of the TRA Taiwan Trunk line.

== Services ==
While still in operation, service was only on work days, excluding government holidays.

== Stations ==
Name	Chinese	Taiwanese	Hakka	Transfers and notes	Location	
Taoyuan	桃園	Thô-hn̂g	Thò-yèn	→ West Coast line	Taoyuan	Taoyuan
Taoyuan Senior High School	桃園高中	Thô-hn̂g Ko-tiong	Thò-yèn Kô-chûng		Taoyuan	Taoyuan
Paoshan	寶山	Pó-san	Pó-sân		Taoyuan	Taoyuan
Nanhsiang	南祥	Lâm-siông	Nàm-siong		Guishan	Taoyuan
Wufu	五福	Ngo͘-hok	Ńg-huk	Freight only	Luzhu	Taoyuan
Changhsing	長興	Tióng-hing	Chhòng-him		Luzhu	Taoyuan
Haishan	海山	Hái-san	Hói-sân		Luzhu	Taoyuan
Haihu	海湖	Hái-ô͘	Hói-fù		Luzhu	Taoyuan
Linkou	林口	Nâ-kháu	Nà-khiéu	Freight only	Linkou	New Taipei
