= Taoyuan railway station =

Railway station in Taoyuan, Taiwan

Taoyuan 桃園
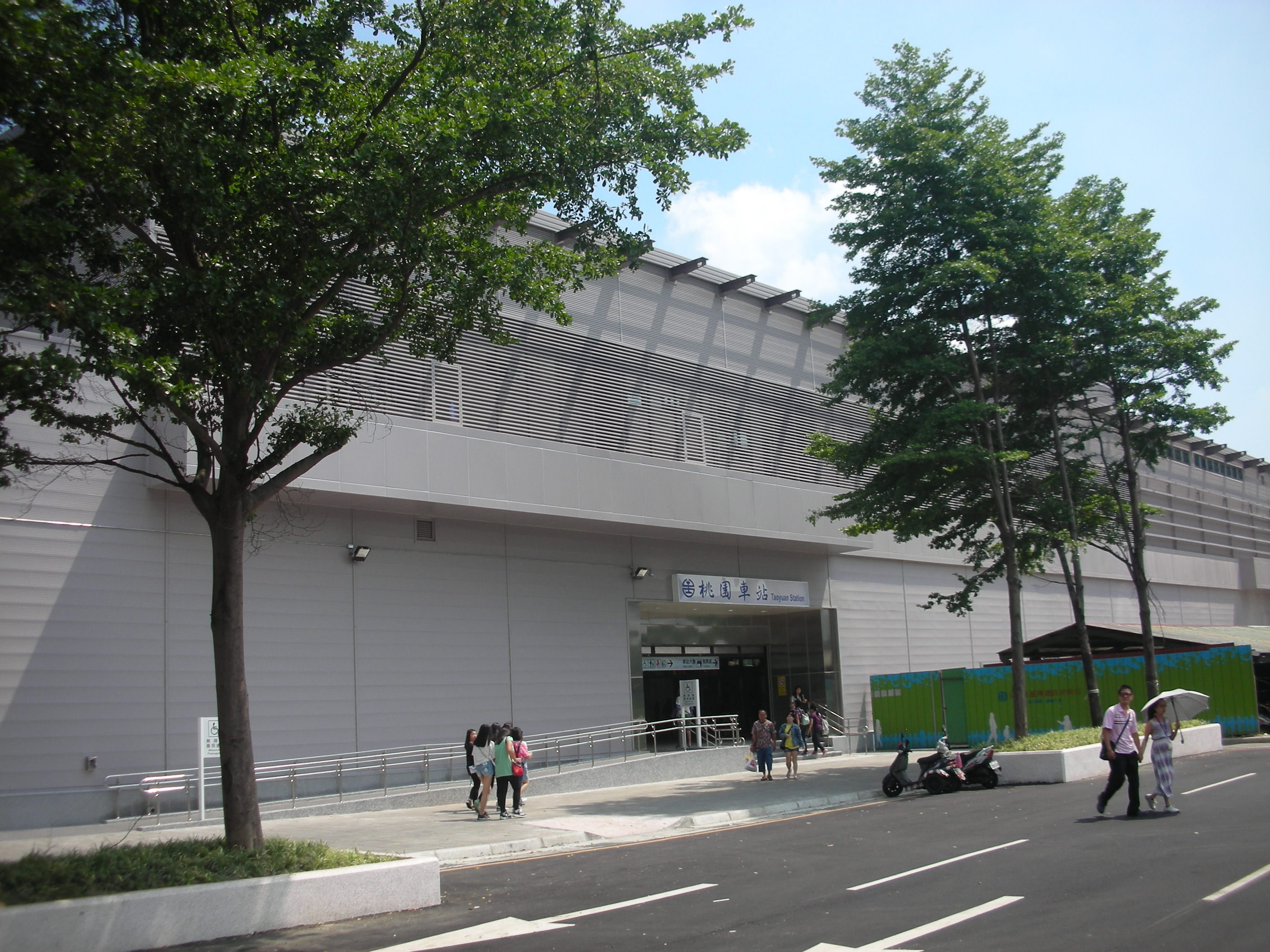

Chinese name
- Traditional Chinese: 桃園
Transcriptions
Standard Mandarin
- Hanyu Pinyin: Táoyuán
- Bopomofo: ㄊㄠˊ ㄩㄢˊ
Hakka
- Romanization: Tǒ-iěn (Sixian dialect); To-rhan (Hailu dialect)
Southern Min
- Tâi-lô: Thô-hn̂g

General information
- Location: 1 Chungcheng Rd; Taoyuan District, Taoyuan; Taiwan
- Coordinates: 24.9892°N 121.3135°E
- System: Taiwan Railway station
- Line: Western Trunk line
- Distance: 57.4 km to Keelung
- Connections: Local bus; Coach

Construction
- Structure type: Ground level

Other information
- Station code: 106 (three-digit); 1015 (four-digit); A18 (statistical)
- Classification: First class (Chinese: 一等)
- Website: www.railway.gov.tw/taoyuan/index.aspx (in Chinese)

History
- Opened: 30 November 1893
- Rebuilt: 26 July 2015
- Electrified: 9 January 1978
- Former names: Taoziyuan (Chinese: 桃仔園); Touen (Japanese: 桃園)

Key dates
- 1905: Rebuilt
- 1962: Rebuilt

Passengers
- 2017: 20.948 million per year ▼1.51%
- Rank: 2 out of 228

Services
Preceding station	Taiwan Railway	Following station
Fengming towards Keelung	Western Trunk line	Neili towards Kaohsiung
Location
- Location within Taiwan

Taoyuan (Chinese: 桃園; pinyin: Táoyuán) is a railway station in Taoyuan, Taiwan served by Taiwan Railway. This was the second busiest station in 2020 in terms of passenger volume, behind Taipei. The Taoyuan MRT is planned to be extended to Taoyuan Railway Station.

== Structure ==
There is one island platform and two side platforms. The side platform of Linkou line is outside the station owing to free service.

The station was undergoing massive construction as of 2023. Two underground island platforms will be built to replace the existing platforms. The tracks for two Taoyuan MRT underground lines are also being built. Because of the construction, the station was temporarily relocated until 2020, when the new platforms and tracks were expected to be completed.

== Service ==
All classes of trains stop at the station, with the exception of one daily Puyuma service. EasyCard usage for trains along West Coast line, Yilan line, and Pingtung line are available at this station.

== History ==
The station began to operate in 1893 during the late Qing rule. In 1905, during Japanese rule, a new wooden terminal was built to replace the existing terminal. It was the terminal station of the Linkou line.

After World War II, the terminal went through another major renovation in 1962, and was used until 2015, when the construction of new platforms began.

Construction of new underground station platforms in the area began in September 2020 as a part of Taoyuan Metropolitan Area Underground Project, which was expected to be completed in September 2030.

== Around the station ==
- Hutou Mountain Park
- Chaoyang Forest Park
- Sanmin Sports Park
- Yangming Sports Park
- Taoyuan Night Market
- Taoyuan City Stadium
- Taoyuan Confucian Temple
- Shin Kong Mitsukoshi Department Store
- FE21 Department Store
- Tonlin Plaza
- Taoyuan Main Bus Station

== Gallery ==
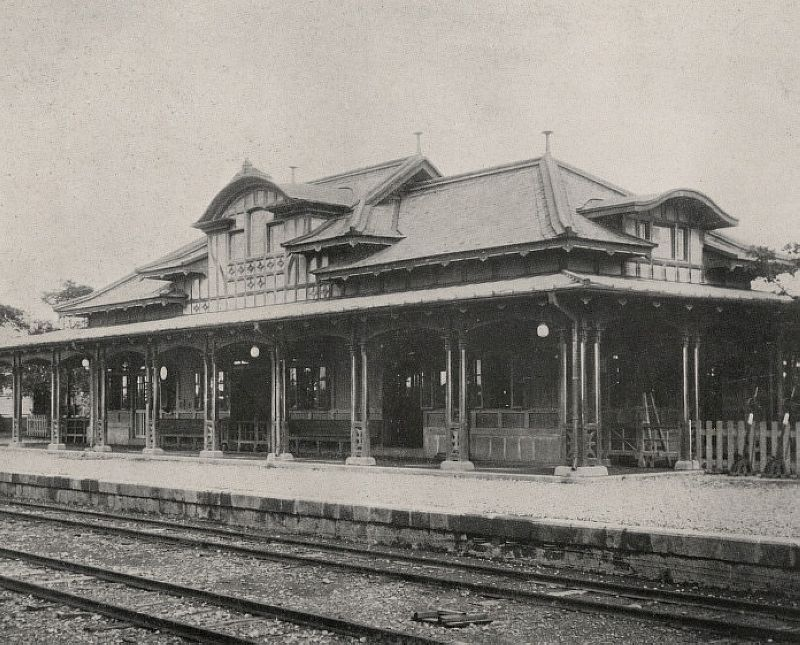
The original station building (circa 1945)

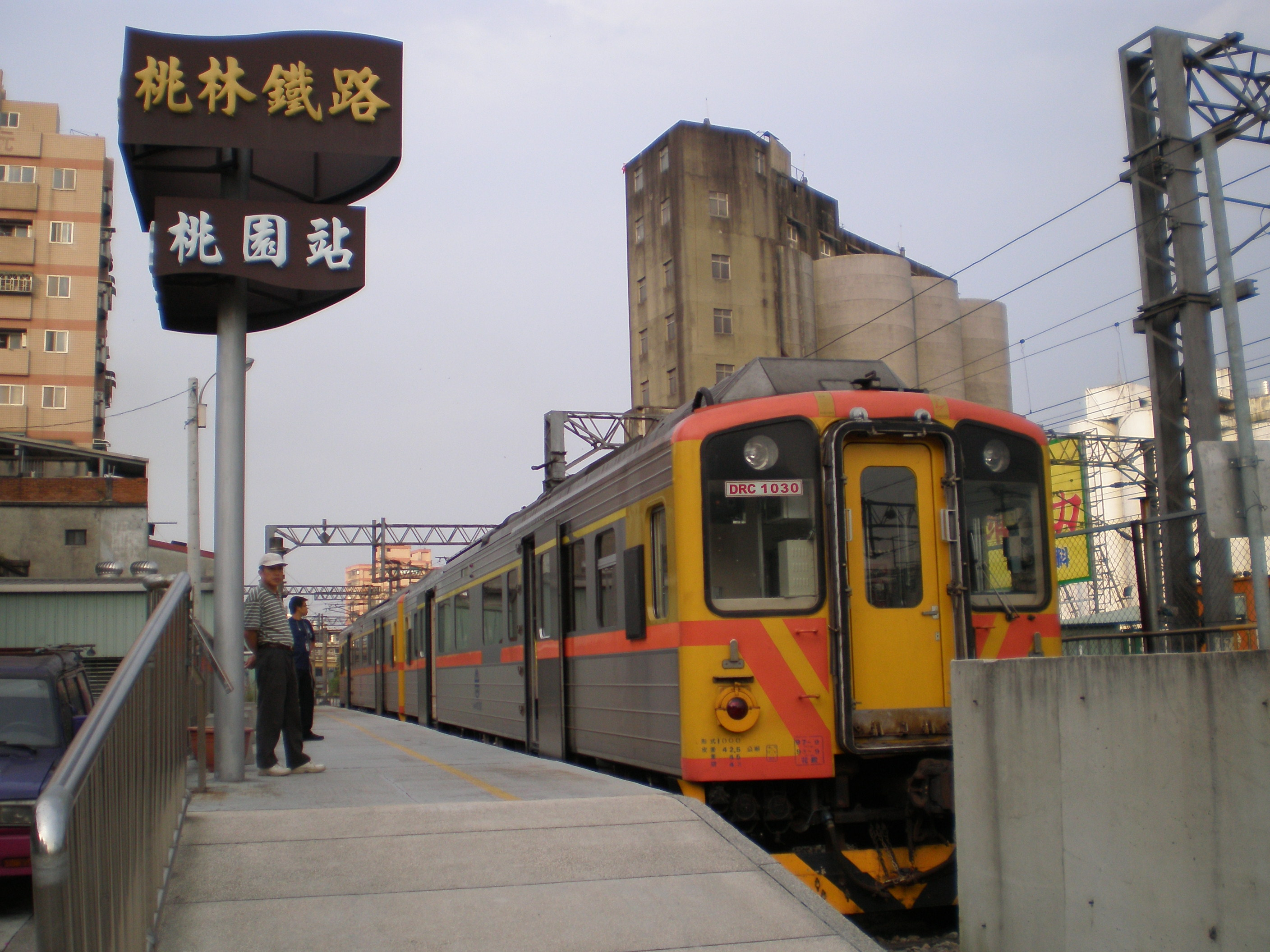
Linkou line platform (circa 2007)

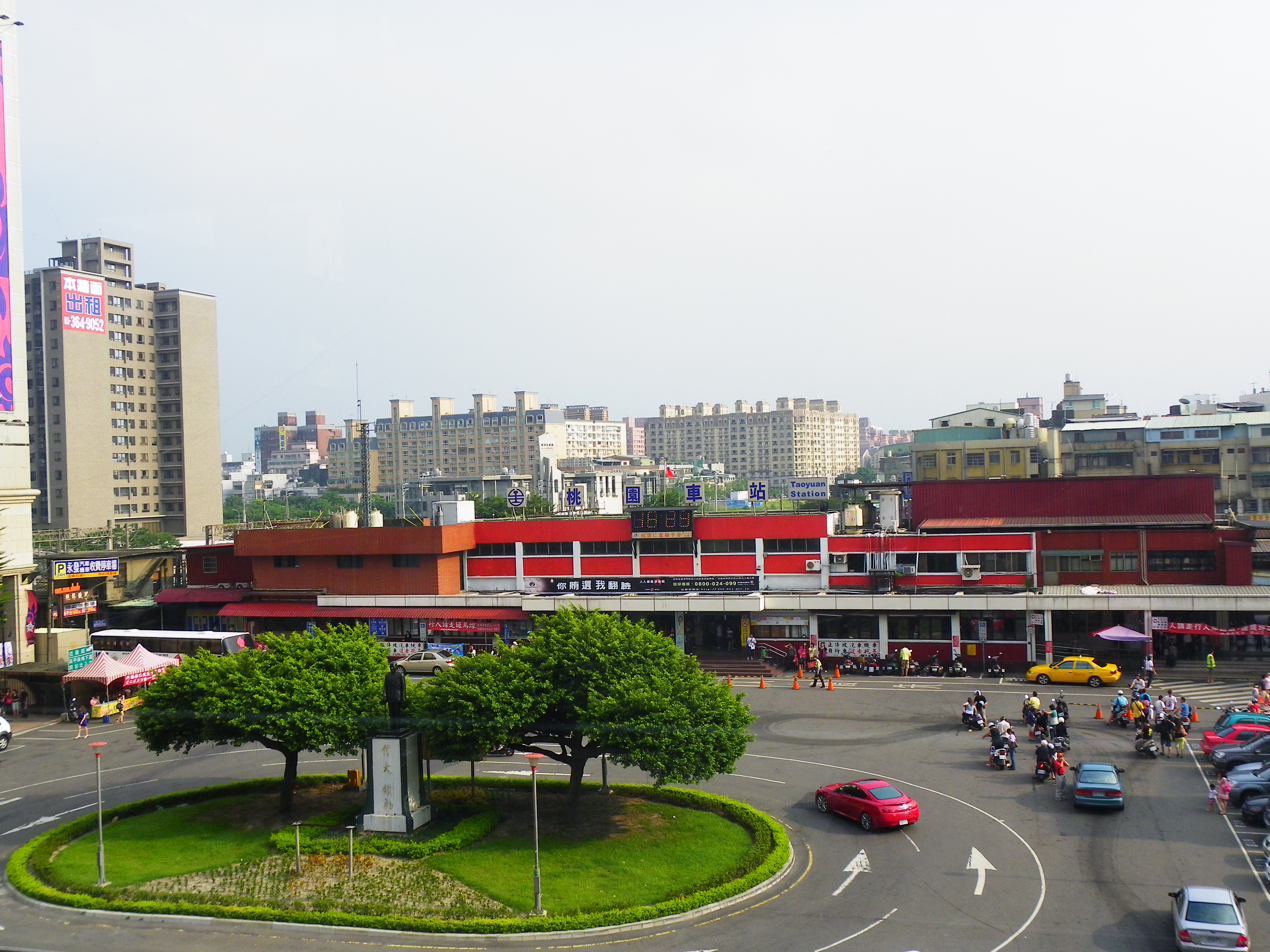

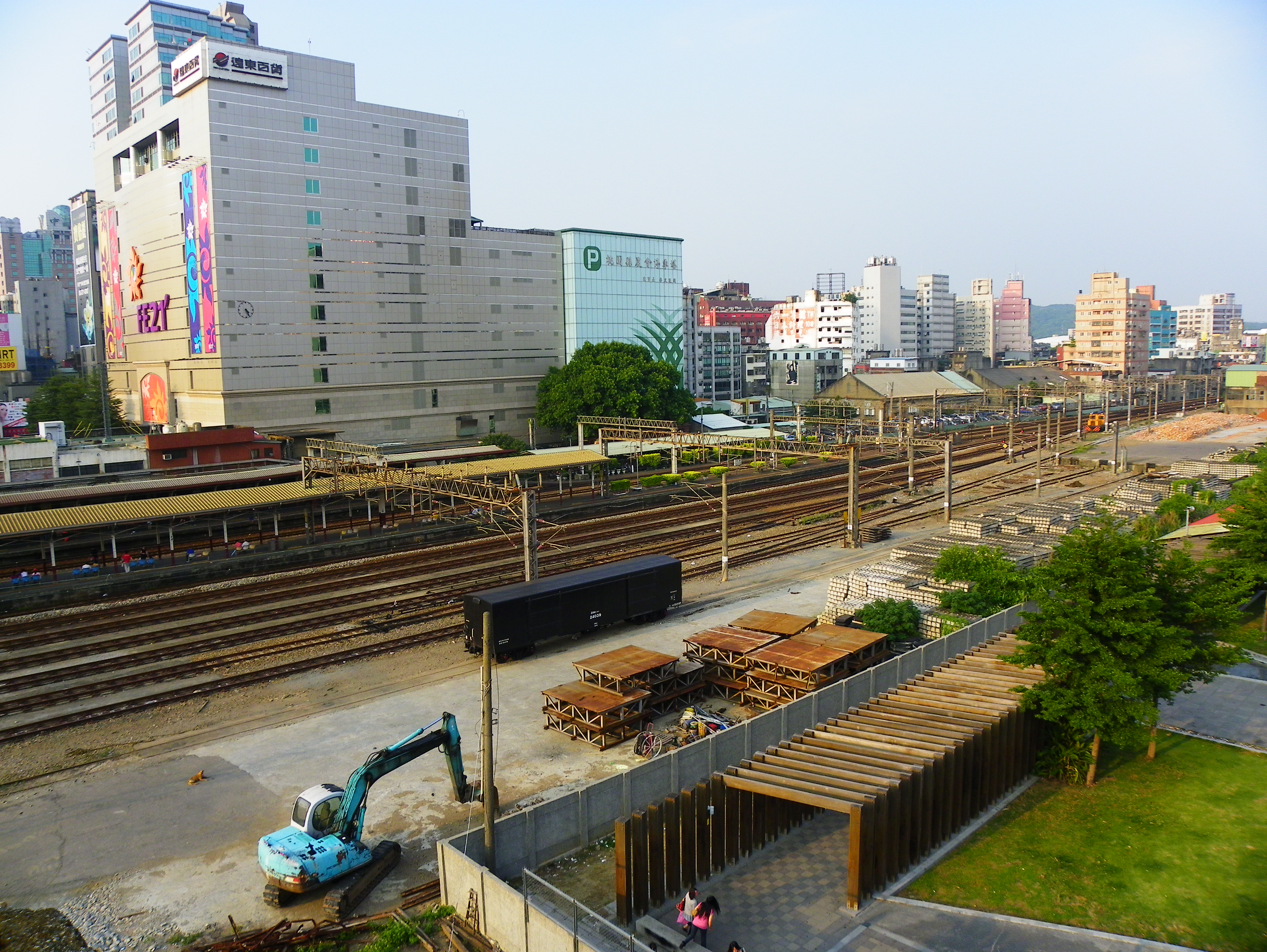

== See also ==
- List of railway stations in Taiwan
