= Nanshiang railway station (Taiwan) =

Former railway station in Guishan, Taoyuan City, Taiwan

Nanshiang Station 南祥車站
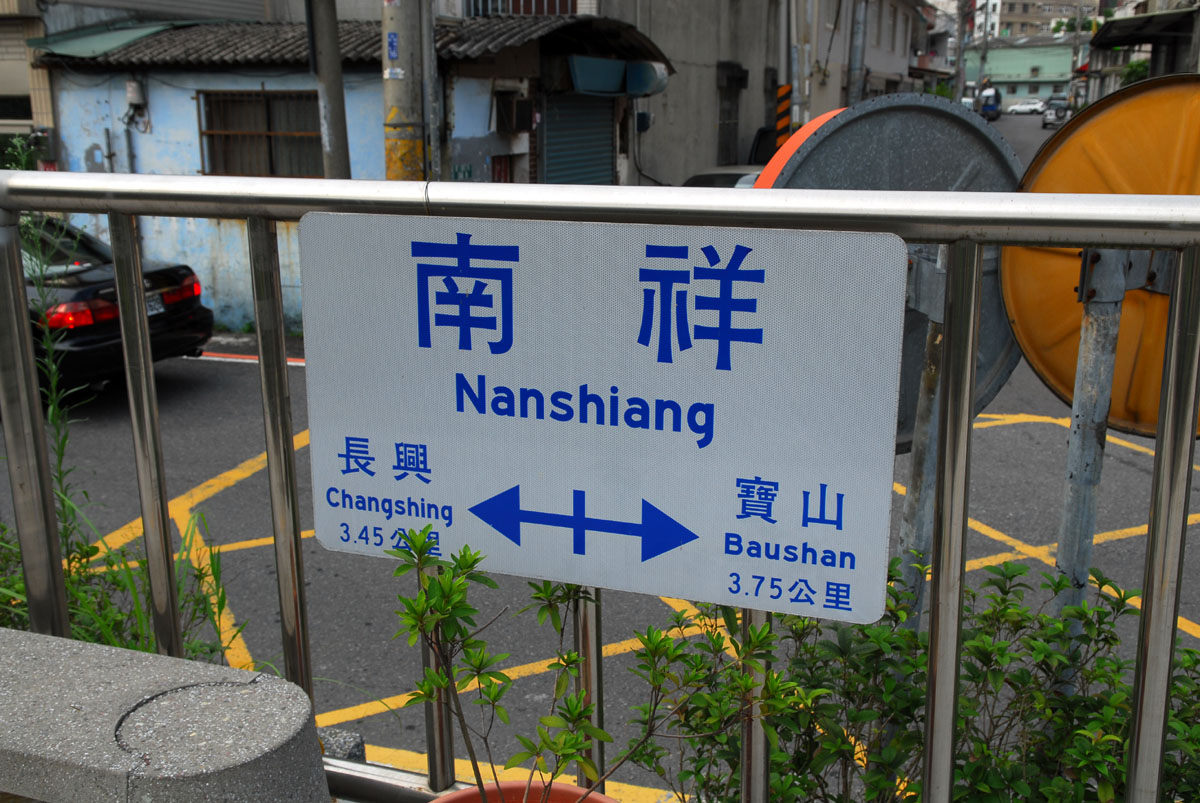

General information
- Location: Guishan, Taoyuan City, Taiwan
- Coordinates: 25.046074°N 121.297258°E
- Owner: Taiwan Railway Corporation
- Line: Linkou

History
- Opened: 28 November 2005
- Closed: 28 December 2012
Location

Nanshiang (Chinese: 南祥車站; pinyin: Nánxiáng Chēzhàn) was a railway station on Taiwan Railway Linkou line located in Guishan District, Taoyuan City, Taiwan.

== History ==
The station was opened on 28 November 2005 but it was then closed on 28 December 2012.

== Nearby stations ==
Taiwan Railway
Baoshan <-- Linkou line --> Wufu

== See also ==
- List of railway stations in Taiwan
