= InterContinental New Taipei Hot Spring =

General information
- Location: No. 210, Huanjin Road, Jinshan District; New Taipei, Taiwan
- Coordinates: 25°13′8″N 121°38′2″E
- Opening: 15 November 2025
- Owner: Highwealth Construction

Technical details
- Floor count: 11

Other information
- Number of rooms: 211
- Number of restaurants: 2

Website
- Official website

The InterContinental New Taipei Hot Spring is an InterContinental hotel at No. 210, Huanjin Road, Jinshan District, New Taipei, Taiwan. With a height of 11 floors, the hotel contains 211 guest rooms and opened on November 16, 2025.

== Location ==
InterContinental New Taipei Hot Spring is located at the north coast of Taiwan, near the Jinshan Old Street and Zhongjiao Bay International Surfing Base and 55-minute drive away from the Taipei Songshan Airport.

== Facilities ==
InterContinental New Taipei Hot Spring offers 211 guest rooms, with the presidential suite priced at NT$880,000 (US$28,186) per night.

The hotel features two restaurants and bars - "Shima" and "Chao".

== See also ==
- InterContinental Hotels Group
- InterContinental Taipei
- InterContinental Taichung
- InterContinental Kaohsiung
