= InterContinental Taipei =

General information
- Location: No. 535, Sec. 4, Zhongxiao E. Rd., Xinyi District; Taipei, Taiwan
- Coordinates: 25°2′34″N 121°33′41″E
- Opening: 8 October 2026
- Owner: Farglory Group

Technical details
- Floor count: 20

Other information
- Number of rooms: 347
- Number of restaurants: 7

Website
- Official website

The InterContinental Taipei is an InterContinental hotel at No. 535, Sec. 4, Zhongxiao E. Rd., Xinyi District, Taipei, Taiwan. The hotel is a part of the Taipei Dome mixed-use development, with a height of 20 floors, containing 347 guest rooms and opened on October 8, 2026.

== Location ==
InterContinental Taipei is located next to the Xinyi Planning District, near the Sun Yat-sen Memorial Hall, Songshan Cultural and Creative Park, Taipei Dome, City Hall, Taipei 101 and 17-minute drive away from the Taipei Songshan Airport.

== Facilities ==
InterContinental Taipei offers 347 guest rooms.

The hotel features seven restaurants and bars - Yi Social, Thea Lounge, NTD Eatery, Rough Cuts, Simple Sips, alongside upcoming venues like Akira Back and DOSA by Akira Back.

== See also ==
- InterContinental Hotels Group
- InterContinental New Taipei Hot Spring
- InterContinental Taichung
- InterContinental Kaohsiung
