= InterContinental Taichung =

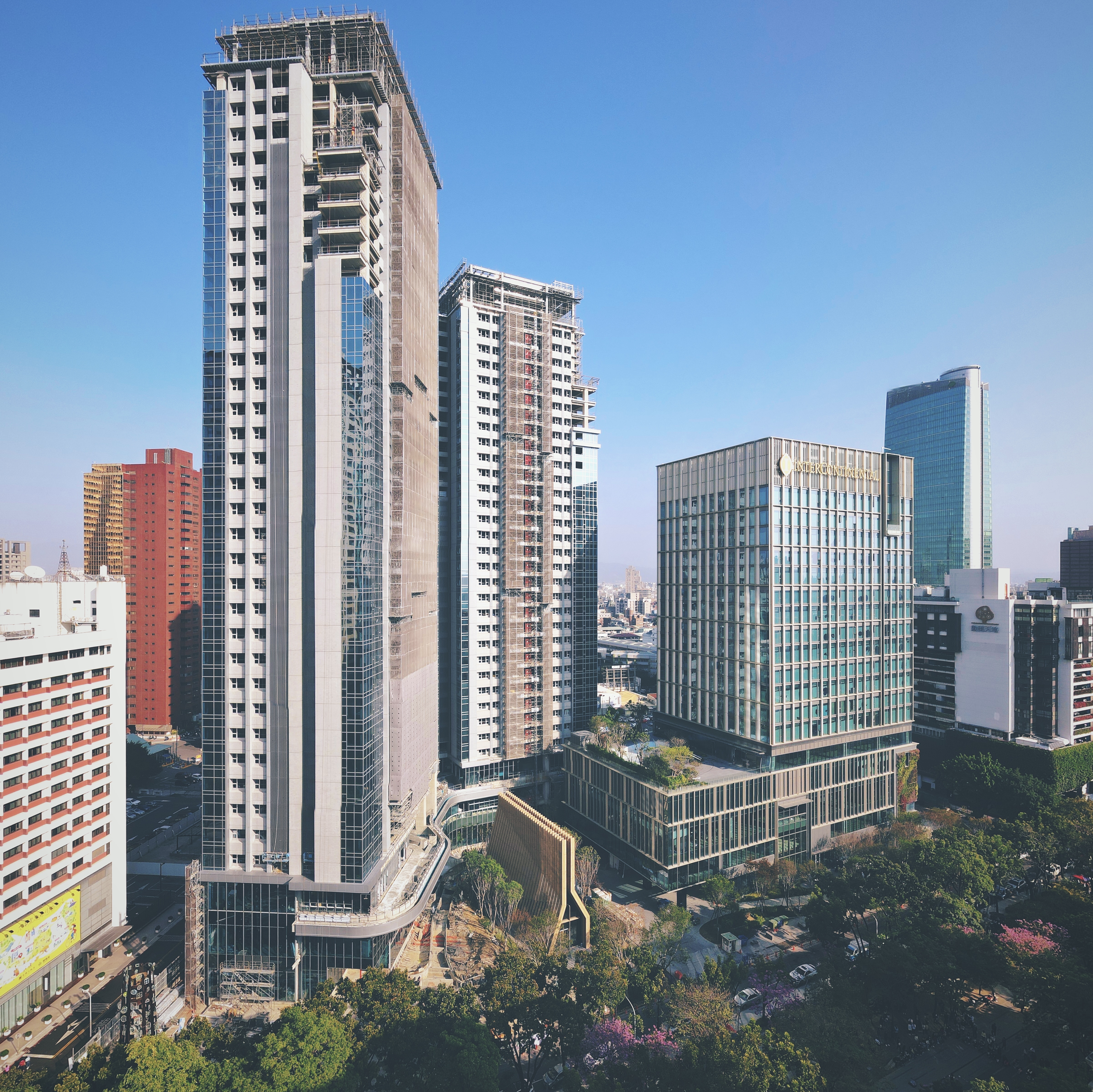

General information
- Location: 77 Guanqian Road, West District; Taichung, Taiwan
- Coordinates: 24°9′8″N 120°39′49″E
- Opening: 23 October 2024
- Owner: CMP Group Ltd.

Technical details
- Floor count: 18

Other information
- Number of rooms: 206
- Number of suites: 17
- Number of restaurants: 3

Website
- Official website

The InterContinental Taichung is an InterContinental hotel at 77 Guanqian Road, West District, Taichung, Taiwan. The hotel is a part of the CMP Midtown mixed-use development, with a height of 85.4 m (280 ft), with 18 floors, containing 206 guest rooms and opened on October 23, 2024.

== Location ==
InterContinental Taichung is located in the center of the Calligraphy Greenway cultural district, near the City Hall, National Taichung Theater and 40-minute drive away from the Taichung International Airport.

== Facilities ==
InterContinental Taichung offers 206 guest rooms including 17 suites.

The hotel features five restaurants and bars - Cai Yue Hot Pot, Ming Juan Lou Chinese Restaurant, IL Limone Italian Restaurant, Leaves & Vines Lobby Lounge and Rolling Bar.

== See also ==
- InterContinental Hotels Group
- InterContinental Taipei
- InterContinental Kaohsiung
