= Farglory THE ONE =

Skyscraper in Qianzhen, Kaohsiung, Taiwan

Farglory THE ONE 遠雄THE ONE
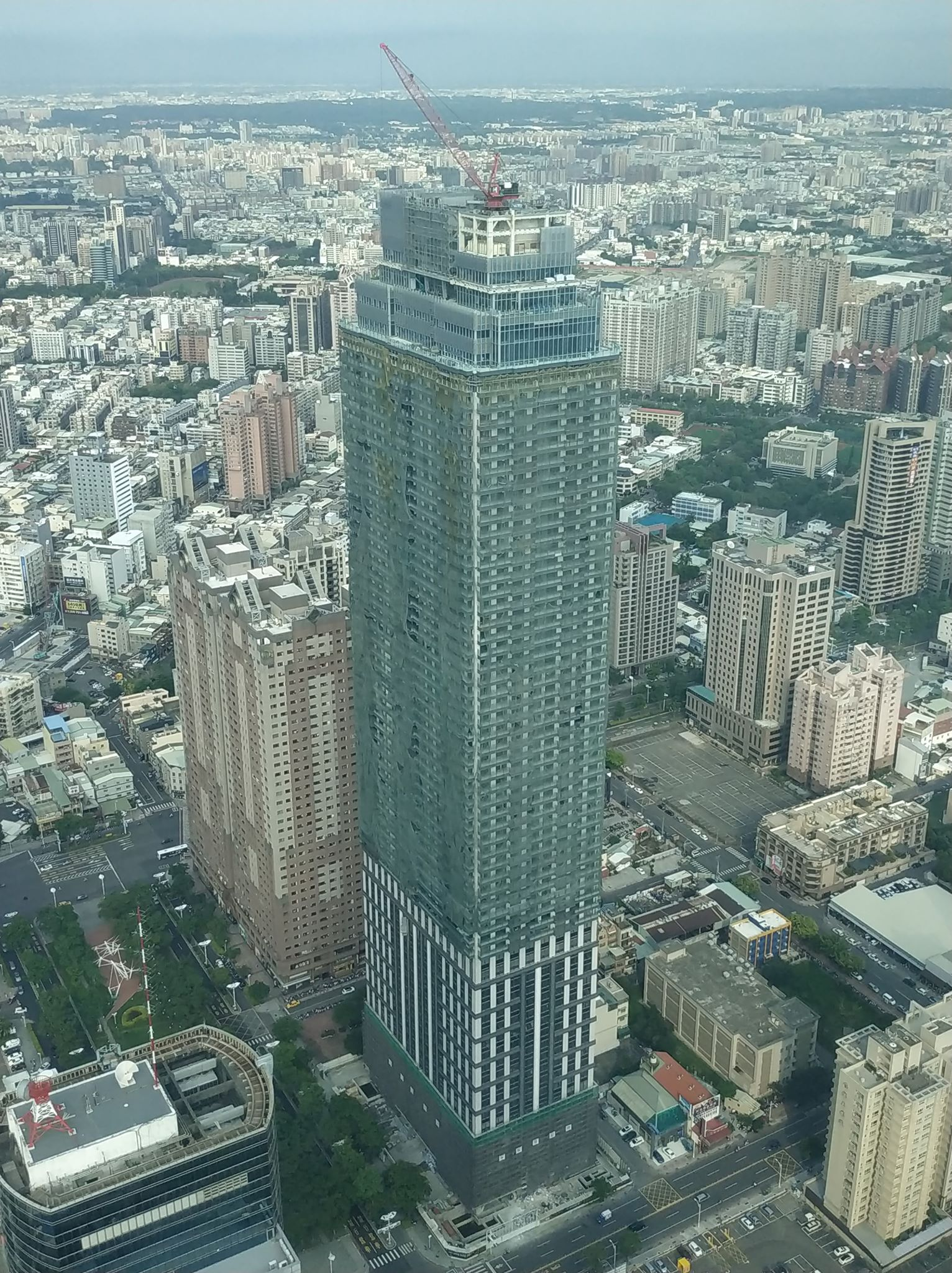
- Farglory THE ONE (May, 2019)
- Interactive map of the Farglory THE ONE 遠雄THE ONE area
- Hotel chain: Farglory Hotel

General information
- Status: Completed
- Type: Hotel, Apartment
- Location: Cianjhen, Kaohsiung, Taiwan
- Coordinates: 22.610998°N 120.303291°E
- Completed: 2019

Height
- Roof: 267.6 meters (878 ft)

Technical details
- Floor count: 68
- Floor area: 166,415.76m^{2}

Design and construction
- Architect: Chu-Yuan Lee

The Farglory THE ONE (Chinese: 遠雄THE ONE) is a skyscraper located in Cianjhen District, Kaohsiung, Taiwan. It is the fourth tallest building in Taiwan and the second tallest in Kaohsiung. The height of building is 267.6 m, the floor area is 166,415.76m^{2}, and it comprises 68 floors above ground, as well as 7 basement levels. It was completed at the end of 2019.

== Gallery ==
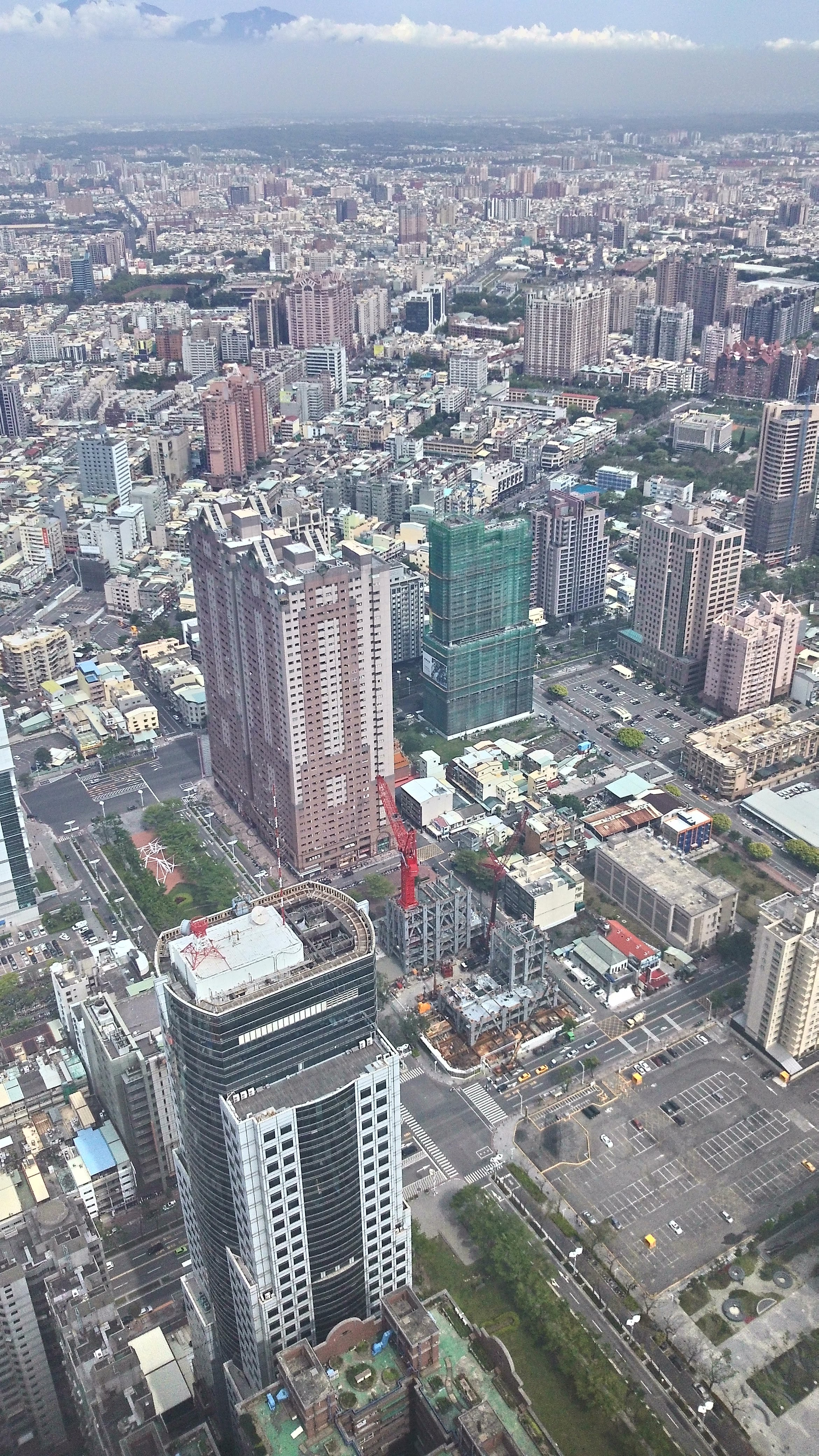
Apr 2016

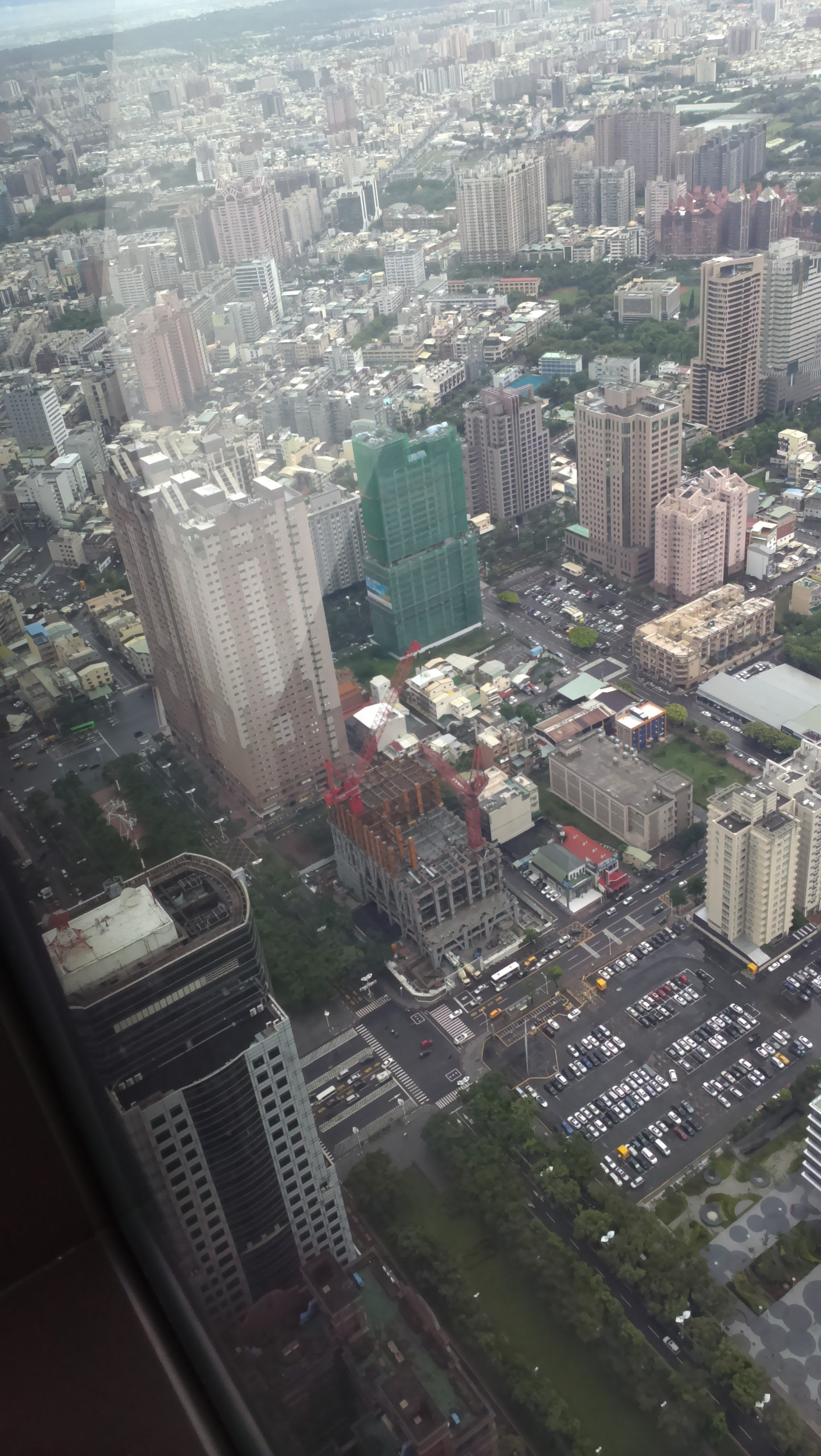
Jun 2016

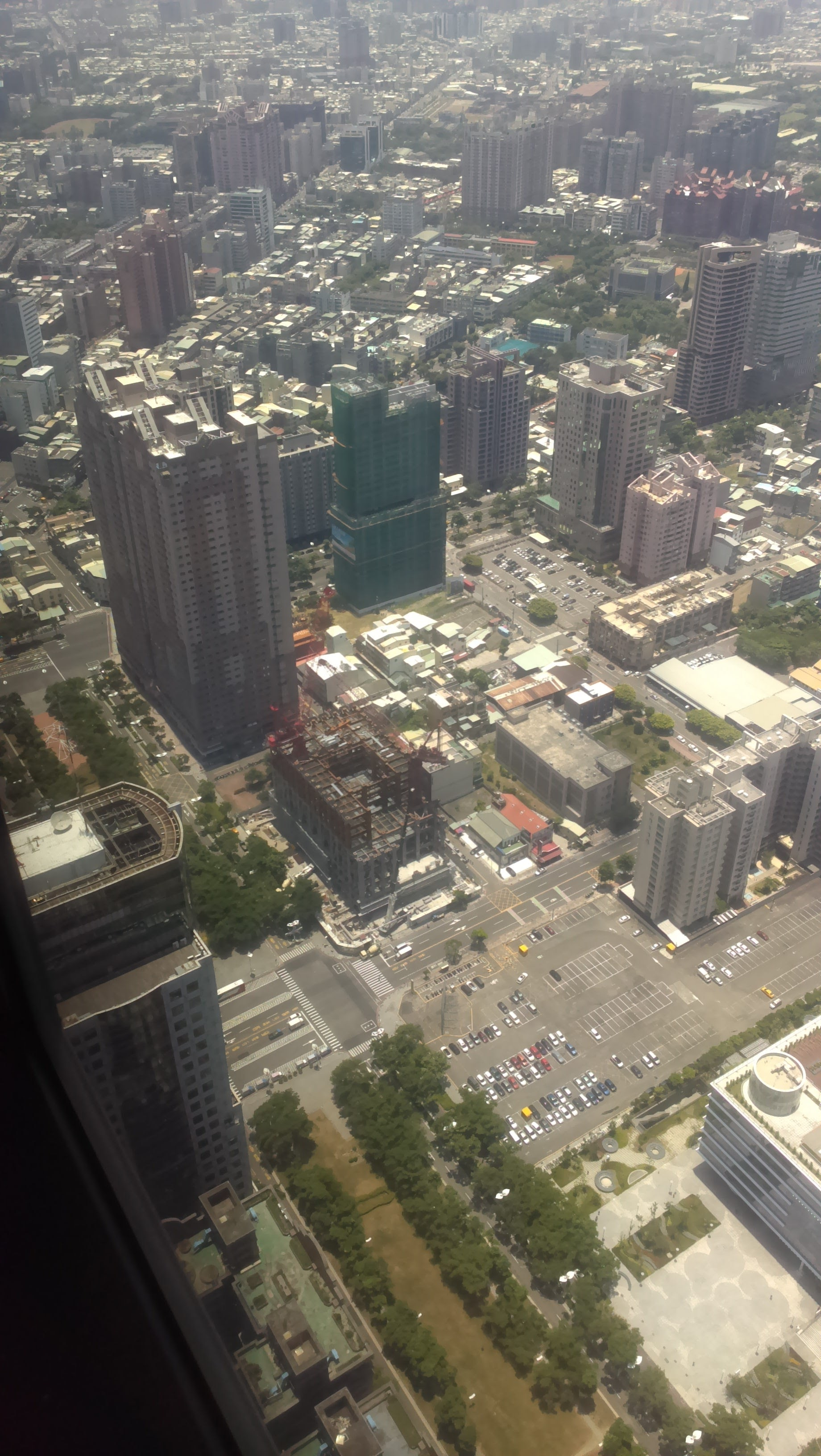
Jul 2016

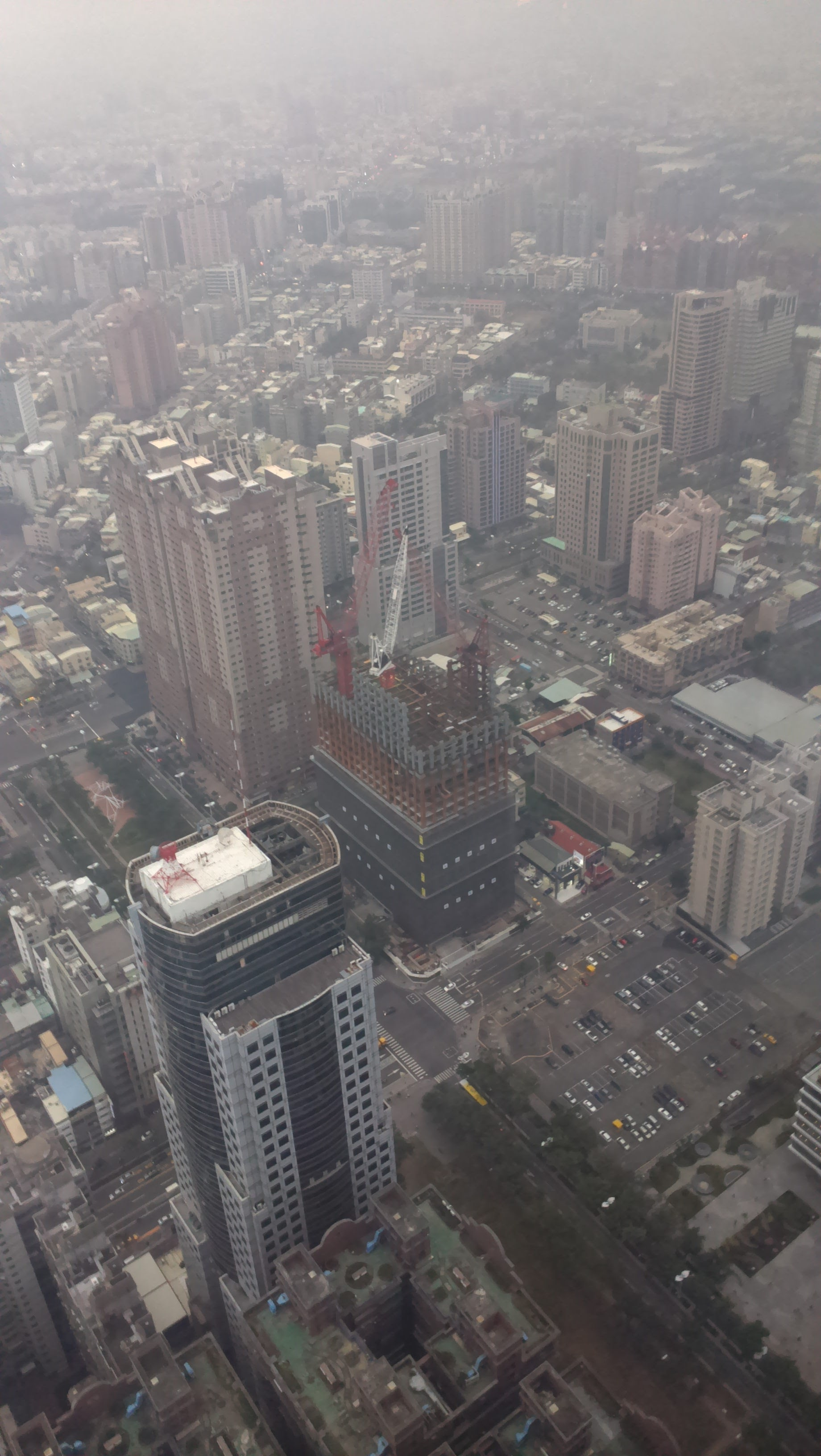
Nov 2016

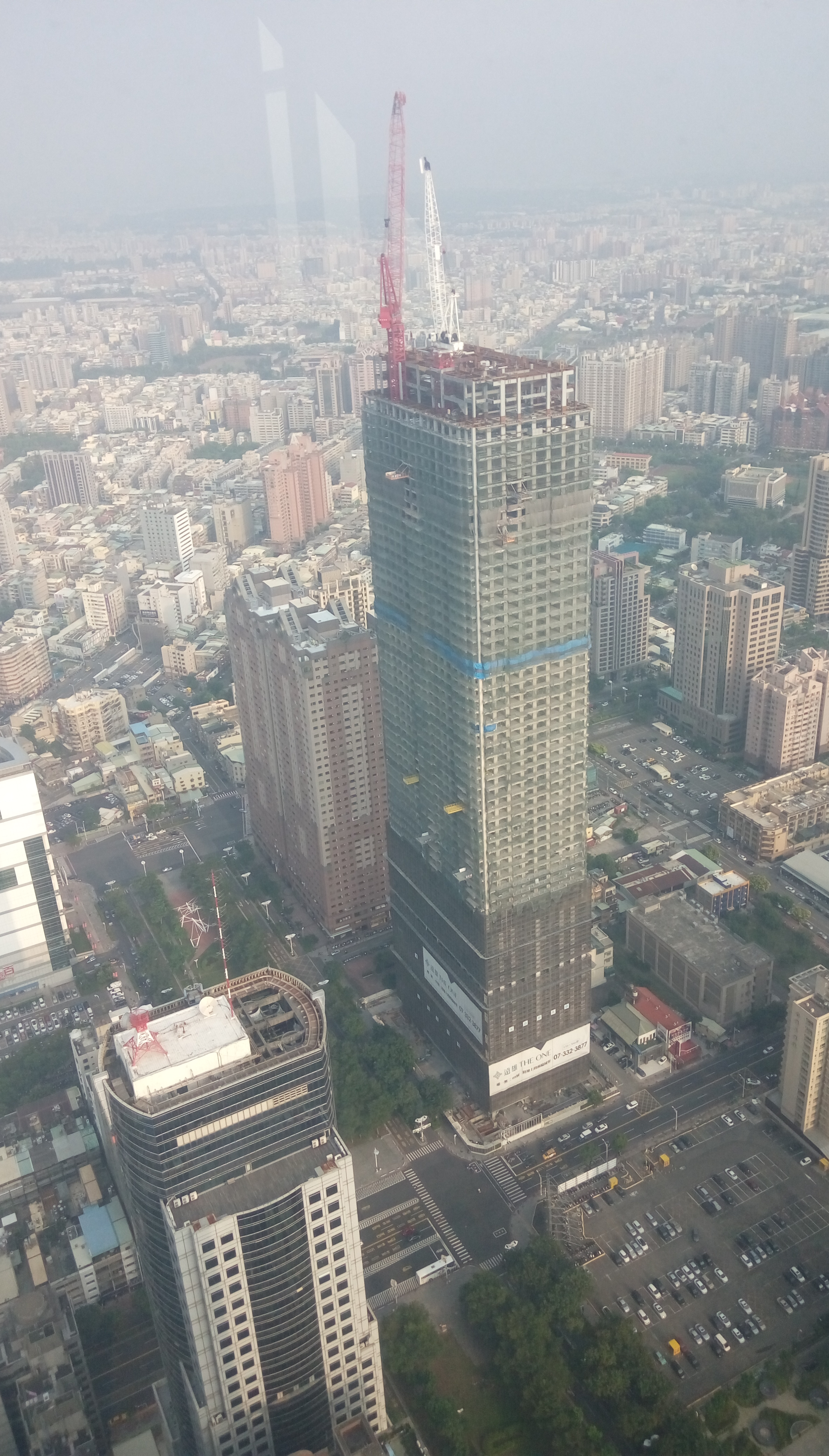
Nov 2017

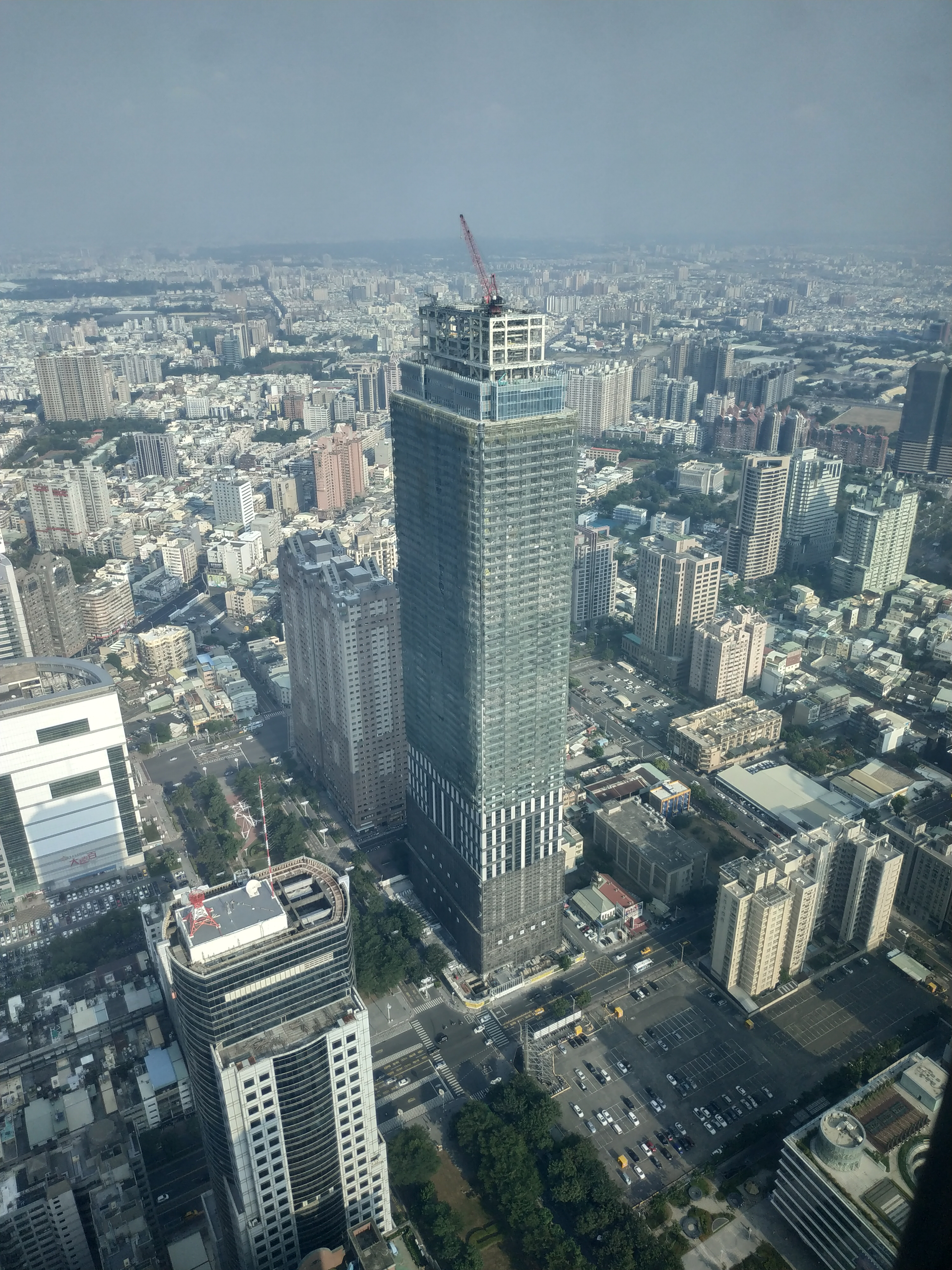
Oct 2018

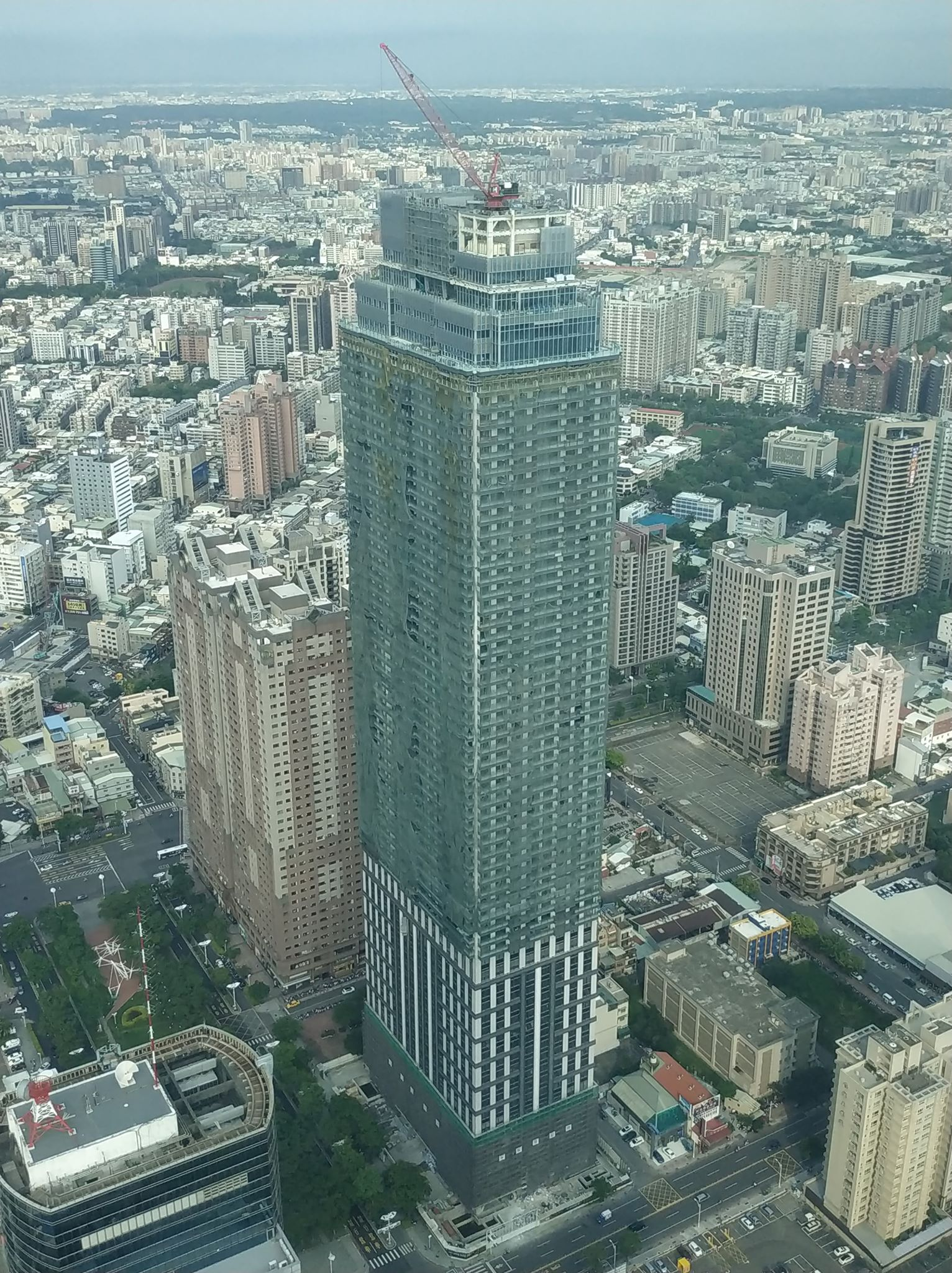
May 2019

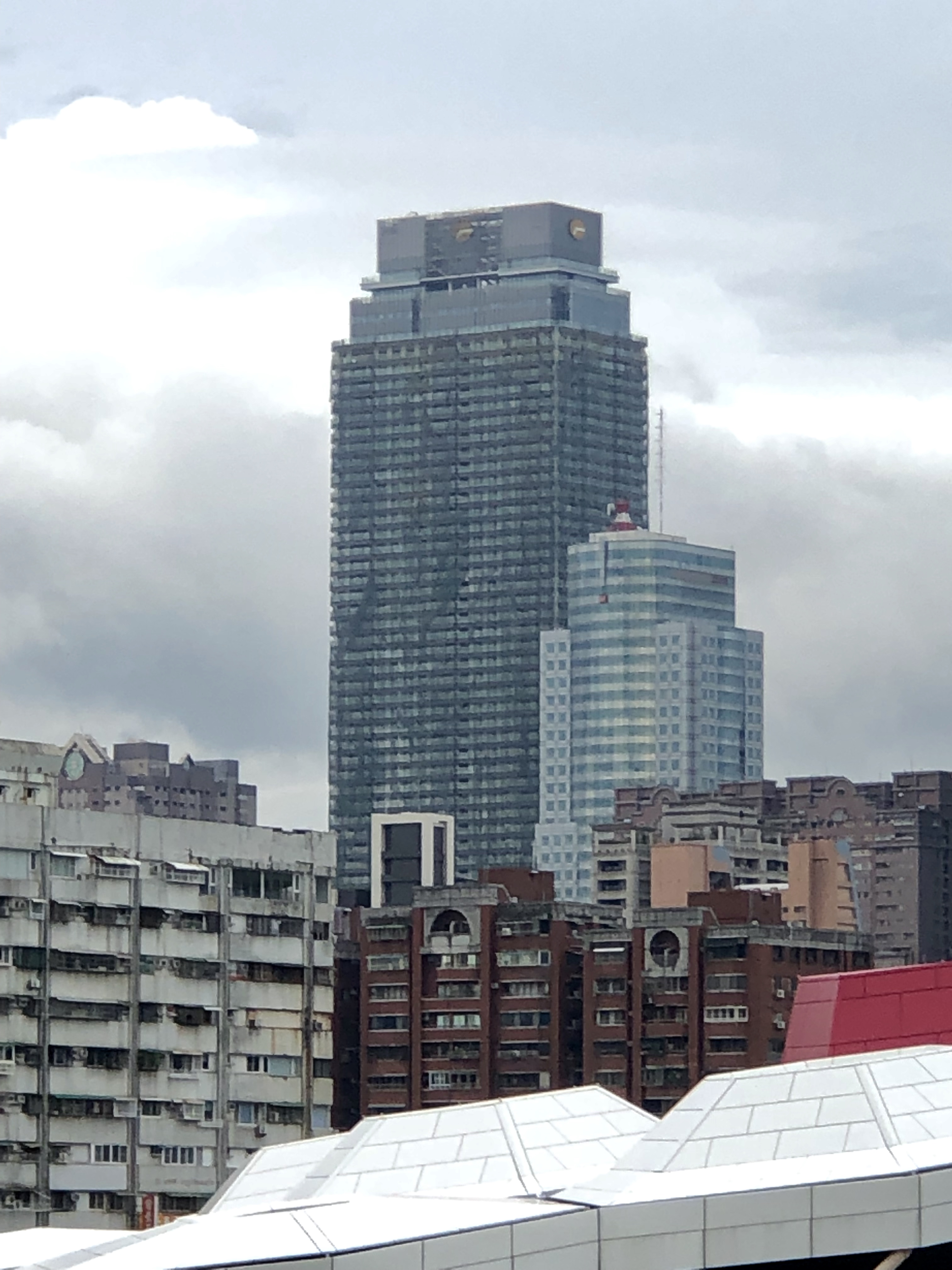
August 2019

== See also ==
- Taipei 101
- Shin Kong Life Tower
- 85 Sky Tower
- List of tallest buildings in Kaohsiung
- List of tallest buildings in Taiwan
