= InterContinental Kaohsiung =

Hotel in Qianzhen, Kaohsiung, Taiwan

- Location within Taiwan

General information
- Location: No. 22, Xinguang Road, Cianjhen District, Kaohsiung, Taiwan
- Coordinates: 22°37′33″N 120°16′55″E
- Opening: November 21, 2021
- Operator: InterContinental

Technical details
- Floor count: 16

Other information
- Number of rooms: 253

Website
- InterContinental Kaohsiung Website

InterContinental Kaohsiung (traditional Chinese: 高雄洲際酒店; simplified Chinese: 高雄洲际酒店; pinyin: Gāoxióng Zhōujì Jiǔdiàn) is a five star hotel located in Cianjhen District, Kaohsiung, Taiwan. It is located on the lower floors of the 266.6 m (875 ft) tall Farglory THE ONE skyscraper building. The hotel opened on November 21, 2021, and is the first InterContinental hotel in Taiwan.

== Location ==
The hotel is located at the heart of Kaohsiung's Asia New Bay Area, near Kaohsiung International Airport, Kaohsiung Main Station and Kaohsiung Exhibition Center. Part of the Farglory THE ONE complex, the hotel commences from the 1st to the 16th floor of the second tallest skyscraper in Kaohsiung, and fourth tallest in Taiwan.

== Facilities ==
InterContinental Kaohsiung is operated by InterContinental and offers a total of 253 guest rooms and suites. The hotel features two restaurants - Zhan Liu and SEEDS, a bar - BL.T33 and a bakery - Delicatesse.

== Notable guests ==
- Blackpink
- Coldplay
- Ed Sheeran
- I-dle
- Mamamoo
- Park Bo-gum
- Twice

== See also ==
- List of tallest buildings in the world
- Farglory THE ONE
- Hotel Nikko Kaohsiung
